= History of cricket in Sri Lanka =

Cricket was introduced to Sri Lanka (then called Ceylon) in the first quarter of the 19th century, following colonisation of the island by the British. The earliest known match was recorded in 1832 and the earliest first-class one in 1926. The national team has played Test cricket from 1982. The national team has achieved international success by winning the 1996 Cricket World Cup and the 2014 ICC World Twenty20. Cricket is played nationwide with Test venues in Colombo, Galle, Kandy and Moratuwa. The country's most notable players include Aravinda de Silva, Arjuna Ranatunga, Rangana Herath, Sanath Jayasuriya, Mahela Jayawardene, Muttiah Muralitharan, Kumar Sangakkara and Chaminda Vaas. Administration and governance are performed by Sri Lanka Cricket, which was founded in July 1922 as the Ceylon Cricket Association (CCA). The main domestic competition is the Premier Trophy which attained first-class status in 1988.

== Development ==
=== Introduction of cricket ===
Cricket was introduced to Ceylon by the British and the first recorded match is dated 1832. The earliest definite mention of cricket in Ceylon was a report in the Colombo Journal on 5 September 1832 which called for the formation of a cricket club. The Colombo Cricket Club was formed and matches began soon afterwards when it played, on the Rifle Green in Colombo, against a team from the 97th Regiment of Foot which was stationed on the island from 1825 to 1836. Through the 19th century, cricket was essentially the preserve of European settlers and visitors but it gradually attracted the native Ceylonese who were, at first, often needed to make up the numbers.

=== Visiting teams ===
In October 1882, Ivo Bligh's England team played an odds (18 against 11) game in Colombo versus a team of Europeans. Bligh's team was en route to Australia, where their mission was to "recover those Ashes". In 1888–89, an English team led by George Vernon toured Ceylon and India, including an 11-a-side game against All-Ceylon at Kandy. In 1890, the Australian team en route to England played in Colombo. The first Indian team to tour Ceylon was from Elphinstone College, Bombay, in 1903–04. The first of numerous visits by Marylebone Cricket Club was in 1911–12, when they played a one-day match on their way to Australia. A New South Wales team captained by The Rev. E. F. Waddy toured in January 1914, playing nine matches. Among other English teams was Sir Julien Cahn's XI, which played five matches in 1936–37.

=== CCA foundation and international aspirations ===
Dr John Rockwood was a noted administrator in Ceylonese cricket and he proposed the creation of a national board to govern and promote the game. This was founded in July 1922 as the Ceylon Cricket Association (CCA), the forerunner of Sri Lanka Cricket. The inaugural first-class match in Ceylon was played 12–13 February 1926 between Rockwood's Ceylon XI and W. E. Lucas' Bombay XI at the Nondescripts Ground in Colombo. Bombay included the Indian Test batsman C. K. Nayudu. Ceylon won by 7 wickets. Five years later, a private international team, including Jack Hobbs, Herbert Sutcliffe, C. K. Nayudu and Syed Mushtaq Ali toured Ceylon and were well matched against the All-Ceylon and native Ceylonese teams they played against, but they easily defeated a European team, thus proving that the standard of the Ceylonese players exceeded that of the Europeans.

For many years first-class cricket was restricted to games by Ceylon against visiting touring teams, notably the English and Australian teams who used the island as a stopover on the long voyage to each other's country. Douglas Jardine's "bodyline" team was there in 1932–33. The first visit by a New Zealand team was in October 1937 to play a one-day match in Colombo. In the aftermath of World War II, the Australian Services team, featuring Keith Miller, toured Ceylon and India. Miller returned as part of the 1948 Australian team which played a game in Colombo en route to England, but it was not until the 1969–70 season that another Australian team came to Ceylon. The first visits to Ceylon by Pakistan and West Indies were both in 1949, in each case to play two internationals. Ceylon were no match for either of them as their teams included the likes of Fazal Mahmood (Pakistan), Everton Weekes and Clyde Walcott (both West Indies).

=== Ceylon v India ===
Occasionally, teams representative of Ceylon played matches abroad, mostly in India. The first such tour took place in 1932–33. The Indian national team visited Ceylon in March 1945 and played an international match against Ceylon at the Paikiasothy Saravanamuttu Stadium in Colombo. The match was drawn on account of bad weather. India's team was a strong one captained by Vijay Merchant and including notable players such as Shute Banerjee, Syed Mushtaq Ali, Lala Amarnath, Vijay Hazare and Rusi Modi.

From 1953–54 until 1975–76, the CCA organised a first-class match against Madras (latterly renamed Tamil Nadu) for the Gopalan Trophy. This fixture was played in Colombo roughly every two years, with one further fixture in 1982–83, the venue alternating with Madras.

In the 1956–57 season, India visited again and played two internationals in Colombo, both of which were drawn. India's team was captained by Polly Umrigar and included Nari Contractor, Subhash Gupte, Pankaj Roy, A. G. Kripal Singh and Vijay Manjrekar. In 1964-65 Ceylon had their first international victory when they defeated India in India by four wickets.

=== Tour of England in 1968 (cancelled) ===
After beating a Pakistan A team in Ceylon and a full Indian team in India in 1964–65, Ceylon looked to a tour of England in 1968 to advance their case to be elevated to Test status. A schedule of 19 matches was arranged from early June to early August, including a match at Lord's against the MCC, nine first-class matches against county teams, and five other first-class matches.

However, the Board of Control for Cricket in Ceylon had insufficient money to pay for the trip, and private donations had to be sought. Also, the government was reluctant to release the necessary foreign exchange at a time when it was struggling to afford vital imports.

The final straw was the selection of the team in April 1968. Chandra Schaffter, one of the four selectors, resigned when he found that the other selectors were going to select each other in the team, one of them as captain. The selected team was Herbert Fernando (captain), Michael Tissera (vice-captain), Ranjit Fernando, Abu Fuard, Gamini Goonesena, Stanley Jayasinghe, T. B. Kehelgamuwa, Dan Piachaud, Anurudda Polonowita, Mano Ponniah, Buddy Reid, Daya Sahabandu, Anura Tennekoon and Dhansiri Weerasinghe. Herbert Fernando and Dhansiri Weerasinghe were the two selectors who chose themselves. The resultant uproar caused the tour to be cancelled in May, just days before the team was scheduled to leave.

=== International success ===
The name of the country changed from Ceylon to Sri Lanka on 22 May 1972. Sri Lanka's performance in its two matches against Pakistan in 1973-74 led the President of the Board of Control for Cricket in Pakistan, A. H. Kardar, to urge the International Cricket Conference (ICC) to consider promoting Sri Lanka to Test status.

The Sri Lankan national team made its first appearance in top-class international cricket at the 1975 Cricket World Cup in England. They were easily beaten by the eventual tournament winners, West Indies, who bowled them out for only 86 runs. Sri Lanka made a good impression in their match against Australia, losing by 52 runs after scoring 276 for 4 in response to Australia's 328 for 5.

Sri Lanka continued to perform well at international level and won the 1979 ICC Trophy. A youth development program instituted by the CCA ensured a continuing supply of good players through domestic competition. The country's progress was duly noted by the International Cricket Council, which awarded its Full Member status to Sri Lanka on 21 July 1981. Sri Lanka became the eighth nation to play Test cricket. The inaugural Test was played at Colombo's Paikiasothy Saravanamuttu Stadium in February 1982 against England, but Sri Lanka lost by 8 wickets.

Sri Lanka won the 1996 Cricket World Cup and the 2014 ICC World Twenty20. Spin bowler Muttiah Muralitharan established a world record for the highest number of wickets taken by a bowler in a Test career with 800 from 1992 to 2010.

== Domestic cricket ==
=== Premier Trophy ===
In 1937–38, the first national domestic competition was established when 12 teams competed for the Daily News Trophy. The tournament's title was changed to the Saravanamuttu Trophy in 1950–51 and then the Robert Senanayake Trophy in 1976–77. After Sri Lanka began playing Test cricket in 1982, sponsorship was acquired and the tournament was re-branded as the Lakspray Trophy for the 1988–89 season when, for the first time, it was designated a first-class competition. Subsequently, the title of Saravanamuttu Trophy was resurrected from 1990 and since 1998 it has been called the Premier Trophy. The most successful team has been Sinhalese Sports Club.

For a full list of winners from 1938, see : Premier Trophy.

=== Premier Limited Overs tournament ===
The first limited overs cricket tournament in Sri Lanka was Brown's Trophy in 1988–89. Only four teams competed in the inaugural competition: Sinhalese Sports Club (winners); Nondescripts Cricket Club (runners-up); Galle Cricket Club; and the Bloomfield Cricket and Athletic Club. The tournament was renamed the Hatna Trophy in 1990–91 and then given its current name, Premier Limited Overs Tournament, in 1998–99.

For a full list of winners from 1988, see : Premier Limited Overs Tournament.

=== Leading players by season ===
The lists below give the leading first-class run scorers and wicket-takers in each domestic season.

==== Batsmen ====
season	batsman	club	runs	average	highest score
1988–89	Brendon Kuruppu	Burgher Recreation Club	339	113.00	126
1989–90	Ajith Wasantha	Moratuwa Sports Club	519	57.66	134
1990–91	Nisal Fernando	Sinhalese Sports Club	656	65.60	160
1991–92	Chaminda Mendis	Colts Cricket Club	551	78.71	177*
1992–93	Aravinda de Silva	Nondescripts Cricket Club	591	53.72	143
1993–94	Athula Samarasekera	Colombo Cricket Club	701	50.07	191
1994–95	Marvan Atapattu	Sinhalese Sports Club	1,302	93.00	181
1995–96	Russel Arnold	Nondescripts Cricket Club	1,430	79.44	217*
1996–97	Romesh Kaluwitharana	Colts Cricket Club	1,172	73.25	179
1997–98	Marvan Atapattu	Sinhalese Sports Club	868	96.44	223
1998–99	Tillakaratne Dilshan	Sebastianites Cricket and Athletic Club	1,027	51.35	194
1999–2000	Avishka Gunawardene	Sinhalese Sports Club	711	41.82	140
2000–01	Hemantha Wickramaratne	Sinhalese Sports Club	830	51.87	139
2001–02	Mahela Jayawardene	Sinhalese Sports Club	1,426	89.12	274
2002–03	Lanka de Silva	Colombo Cricket Club	938	42.63	133
2003–04	Tillakaratne Dilshan	Bloomfield Cricket and Athletic Club	1,284	51.36	151
2004–05	Shantha Kalavitigoda	Colts Cricket Club	885	49.16	152
2005–06	Gayan Wijekoon	Chilaw Marians Cricket Club	993	62.06	150*
2006–07	Rasika Priyadarshana	Lankan Cricket Club	822	43.26	140
2007–08	Tharanga Paranavitana	Sinhalese Sports Club	1,059	81.46	236
2008–09	Angelo Mathews	Colts Cricket Club	1,038	79.84	270
2009–10	Dimuth Karunaratne	Sinhalese Sports Club	1,186	56.47	185
2010–11	Tharanga Paranavitana	Sinhalese Sports Club	1,047	65.43	202
2011–12	Chamara Silva	Bloomfield Cricket and Athletic Club	1,306	87.06	216
2012–13	Kaushal Silva	Sinhalese Sports Club	1,073	89.41	180
2013–14	Jehan Mubarak	Nondescripts Cricket Club	1,165	105.90	222*
2014–15	Milinda Siriwardene	Badureliya Sports Club	1,144	67.29	185*
2015–16	Tharanga Paranavitana	Tamil Union Cricket and Athletic Club	953	79.41	150*
2016–17	Sadeera Samarawickrama	Colts Cricket Club	1,209	63.63	185
2017–18					

==== Bowlers ====
season	bowler	club	wickets	average	best return
1988–89	Don Anurasiri	Panadura Sports Club	24	13.12	8/53
1989–90	Jayananda Warnaweera	Galle Cricket Club	71	13.47	7/16
1990–91	Saliya Ahangama	Sinhalese Sports Club	39	14.89	5/44
1991–92	Pramodya Wickramasinghe	Sinhalese Sports Club	38	13.10	10/41
1992–93	Chaminda Hathurusingha	Tamil Union Cricket and Athletic Club	35	16.65	8/40
1993–94	Manjula Munasinghe	Sinhalese Sports Club	46	16.43	9/38
1994–95	Don Anurasiri	Panadura Sports Club	78	15.67	8/90
1995–96	Mangala Jayasena	Panadura Sports Club	67	21.41	5/72
1996–97	Bandula Ranjith	Singha Sports Club	70	16.40	9/29
1997–98	Chandika Hathurusingha	Moors Sports Club	35	16.17	7/55
1998–99	Priyankara Wickramasinghe	Bloomfield Cricket and Athletic Club	76	13.01	8/47
1999–2000	Dinuka Hettiarachchi	Colts Cricket Club	55	15.09	5/20
2000–01	Sajeewa Weerakoon	Burgher Recreation Club	80	12.97	7/51
2001–02	Muttiah Muralitharan	Tamil Union Cricket and Athletic Club	87	13.47	9/51
2002–03	Nandika Ranjith	Moors Sports Club	69	17.10	6/27
2003–04	Muttiah Muralitharan	Tamil Union Cricket and Athletic Club	96	14.40	7/46
2004–05	Sajeewa Weerakoon	Burgher Recreation Club	52	20.80	7/81
2005–06	Upul Indrasiri	Ragama Cricket Club	60	13.55	7/61
2006–07	Gayan Sirisoma	Lankan Cricket Club	60	15.50	7/42
2007–08	Ajantha Mendis	Sri Lanka Army Sports Club	68	10.51	7/37
2008–09	Sajeewa Weerakoon; Seekkuge Prasanna	Colts Cricket Club; Sri Lanka Army Sports Club	71; 71	20.35; 20.70	7/40; 8/59
2009–10	Sohan Boralessa; Sachithra Senanayake	Colombo Cricket Club; Sinhalese Sports Club	72; 72	18.41; 23.47	9/47; 8/117
2010–11	Dulanjana Kalhara	Sri Lanka Navy Sports Club	68	16.47	8/45
2011–12	Dulanjana Kalhara	Sri Lanka Navy Sports Club	64	18.10	8/93
2012–13	Malinda Pushpakumara	Moors Sports Club	68	21.00	7/56
2013–14	Tharindu Kaushal	Nondescripts Cricket Club	63	24.88	7/79
2014–15	Tharindu Kaushal	Nondescripts Cricket Club	75	17.90	8/131
2015–16	Lakshan Sandakan	Colombo Cricket Club	52	23.19	5/67
2016–17	Malinda Pushpakumara	Chilaw Marians Cricket Club	98	14.70	8/127
2017–18					

== See also ==
- Cricket in Sri Lanka
- Marylebone Cricket Club tours of Ceylon and Sri Lanka
- Sri Lanka national cricket team
- Sri Lanka national women's cricket team
- Sri Lanka Cricket, the controlling body for cricket in Sri Lanka

== Bibliography ==
- Bowen, Rowland (1970). Cricket: A History of its Growth and Development. London: Eyre & Spottiswoode. ISBN 0-413-27860-3.
- Harte, Chris (1993). A History of Australian Cricket. London: Andre Deutsch. p. 175. ISBN 0-233-98825-4.
- Morgan, Roy (2007). Encyclopaedia of World Cricket. Cheltenham: SportsBooks Ltd. ISBN 978-1-899807-51-2.
- Perera, S. S. (1999). The Janashakthi Book of Sri Lanka Cricket (1832–1996). Colombo: Janashakthi Insurance.
- Ramaswami, N. S. (1975). From Porbandar to Wadekar. Abhinav Publications.
