= List of Ruhuna representative cricketers =

This is a list of cricket players who have played representative cricket for Southern Province in Sri Lanka. The team is currently known as Ruhuna, but has also played as Southern Province until 2005.

The list includes players that have played at least one match, in senior First-Class, List A cricket, or Twenty20 matches for the Ruhuna/Southern Province team. Practice matches are not included, unless they have officially been classified as First-class tour matches.

The Inter-Provincial Cricket Tournament is the premier domestic cricket competition in Sri Lanka. It was founded in 1990.

== First Class Players ==
All of the cricket players who have represented Ruhuna in first class cricket in order of their appearance for the team:

- 1. Dileepa Wickramasinghe
- 2. Lyndon Loos
- 3. Aruna de Silva
- 4. Sanath Jayasuriya
- 5. Marvan Atapattu
- 6. Nishan Dhanasinghe
- 7. Upul Sumathipala
- 8. Champaka Ramanayake
- 9. Pawuththuwadura Milton
- 10. Jayantha Samarasekera
- 11. Jayananda Warnaweera
- 12. Rohitha Ranjith
- 13. Shihabdeen Faumi
- 14. Buwalu Nilan
- 15. Halambage Premasiri
- 16. Athula Samarasekera
- 17. Indika de Saram
- 18. Priyanka de Silva
- 19. Pramodya Wickramasinghe
- 20. Janaka Kumudu
- 21. Hasitha Rajapakse
- 22. Samantha Kodituwakku
- 23. Keshara Ratnaweera
- 24. W. Galappathy
- 25. Grashan Liyanage
- 26. Ruchira Palliyaguru
- 27. Jagath Nandakumar
- 28. Mahinda Ekanayake
- 29. Jayasinghe Mahindaratne
- 30. Saman Fonseka
- 31. Hemantha Devapriya
- 32. Upul Chandana
- 33. Janak Gamage
- 34. Thusara Sampath
- 35. Gayan Silva
- 36. Saman Jayantha
- 37. Sujith Kulatunga
- 38. Kapugama Priyantha
- 39. Rasika Priyadarshana
- 40. Duminda Wickramasinghe
- 41. Chaminda Bandara
- 42. K. B. Chandana
- 43. Vijitha Kumara
- 44. Saman Jayasekera
- 45. Warusawitharan Kusumsiri
- 46. Malaka de Silva
- 47. Suraj Sanjeewa
- 48. Asela Wewalwala
- 49. Tushara Munasinghe
- 50. Sanjaya Rodrigo
- 51. Chamara Silva
- 52. Prasanna Jayawardene
- 53. Nimesh Perera
- 54. Charitha Buddhika
- 55. Chamikara Mudalige
- 56. Tharanga Lakshitha
- 57. Lasith Malinga
- 58. Dammika Kariyawasam
- 59. Amila Perera
- 60. Ravindra Wimalasiri
- 61. Malinga Bandara
- 62. Anushka Polonowita
- 63. Hemantha Wickramaratne
- 64. Harsha Vithana
- 65. Dilshan Vitharana
- 66. Indika Gallage
- 67. Suraj Randiv
- 68. Sajeewa Weerakoon
- 69. Malinga Surappulige
- 70. Upul Tharanga
- 71. Thilina Masmulla
- 72. Ashan Priyanjan
- 73. Anil Rideegammanagedera
- 74. Gihan de Silva
- 75. Kosala Kulasekara
- 76. Sachithra Senanayake
- 77. Sujeewa de Silva
- 78. Ishan Mutaliph
- 79. Lasith Fernando
- 80. Dilhara Lokuhettige
- 81. Tyron Gamage
- 82. Ian Daniel
- 83. Dinesh Chandimal
- 84. Geeth Alwis
- 85. Harsha Cooray
- 86. Shaminda Eranga
- 87. Chanaka Komasaru
- 88. Tillakaratne Sampath

== List 'A' Players ==
All of the Players who have represented Ruhuna in List A cricket domestic one day competitions:

- 1. Upul Tharanga
- 2. Sanath Jayasuriya
- 3. Saman Jayantha
- 4. Indika de Saram
- 5. Gihan de Silva
- 6. Anil Rideegammanagedera
- 7. Dilhara Lokuhettige
- 8. Kosala Kulasekara
- 9. Sachithra Senanayake
- 10. Lasith Malinga
- 11. Sujeewa de Silva
- 12. Tillakaratne Sampath
- 13. Sajeewa Weerakoon
- 14. Lasith Fernando
- 15. Tharanga Lakshitha
- 16. Dinesh Chandimal
- 17. Ashan Priyanjan
- 18. Geeth Alwis
- 19. Shaminda Eranga
- 20. Sachithra Serasinghe
- 21. Kaushal Silva
- 22. Chamara Silva
- 23. Jeewan Mendis
- 24. Chinthaka Jayasinghe
- 25. Suraj Randiv
- 26. Isuru Udana
- 27. Nuwan Pradeep
- 28. Suranga Lakmal
- 29. Muthumudalige Pushpakumara

== Twenty20 Players ==
All of the Players who have represented Ruhuna in Twenty20 domestic competitions:

- 1. Yohan de Silva
- 2. Dilhara Lokuhettige
- 3. Indika de Saram
- 4. Anil Rideegammanagedera
- 5. Kosala Kulasekara
- 6. Sachithra Senanayake
- 7. Gihan de Silva
- 8. Sujeewa de Silva
- 9. Sajeewa Weerakoon
- 10. Ashan Priyanjan
- 11. Tillakaratne Sampath
- 12. Amila Prasad
- 13. Upul Tharanga
- 14. Sanath Jayasuriya
- 15. Saman Jayantha
- 16. Tharanga Lakshitha
- 17. Lasith Malinga
- 18. Dinesh Chandimal
- 19. Geeth Alwis
- 20. Shaminda Eranga
- 21. Mahela Udawatte
- 22. Amal Athulathmudali
- 23. Milinda Siriwardene
- 24. Janaka Gunaratne
- 25. Shalika Karunanayake
- 26. Chinthaka Perera
- 27. Suraj Randiv
- 28. Chanaka Welagedara
- 29. Omesh Wijesiriwardene
- 30. Shihan Kamileen
- 31. Yasoda Lanka
- 32. Arosh Janoda
- 33. Kushal Perera
- 34. Alankara Asanka
