= Roger Wijesuriya =

Roger Wijesuriya රොජර් විජේසූරිය
Personal information
- Full name: Roger Gerard Christopher Ediriweera Wijesuriya
- Born: 18 February 1960 (age 66); Moratuwa, Sri Lanka
- Batting: Right-handed
- Bowling: Slow left arm orthodox

International information
- National side: Sri Lanka (1982–1985)
- Test debut (cap 15): 22 March 1982 v Pakistan
- Last Test: 7 November 1985 v Pakistan
- ODI debut (cap 26): 12 March 1982 v Pakistan
- Last ODI: 3 November 1985 v Pakistan

Career statistics
Competition	Test	ODI	FC	LA
Matches	4	8	42	22
Runs scored	22	18	486	64
Batting average	4.40	18.00	16.20	21.33
100s/50s	0/0	0/0	0/1	0/0
Top score	8	12*	77*	24*
Balls bowled	586	312	7,014	931+
Wickets	1	8	107	32
Bowling average	294.00	35.87	25.77	21.34
5 wickets in innings	0	0	3	1
10 wickets in match	0	0	1	0
Best bowling	1/68	2/25	6/51	5/21
Catches/stumpings	1/–	2/–	27/–	5/–
- Source: ESPNcricinfo, 24 December 2014

Roger Gerard Christopher Ediriweera Wijesuriya (born 18 February 1960) is a Sri Lankan former cricketer, who played four Tests and eight One Day Internationals (ODIs) for the Sri Lanka cricket team. He is known for having the worst bowling average in Test match cricket.

== Pre-Test career ==
Wijesuriya represented Sri Lanka from 1978–79 until 1985–86, but never impressed in international cricket, although his first class and List A statistics were quite decent. His first match for Sri Lanka was a one-day game against West Indies, where he took the wicket of Larry Gomes as Sri Lanka won by seven wickets. Wijesuriya was also picked for the 1979 tour of England, where he ended up with ten wickets at an average of 37.70 in five first class games, including three for 13 against Scotland in a rain-hit three-day game. He did not, however, appear at the 1979 World Cup in England. Wijesuriya also toured Pakistan as a youth player some time before 1979, taking 25 wickets in a series.

Wijesuriya was recalled for the 1981 tour of England, and impressed slightly more, recording his first career five-wicket-haul with five for 35 against a combined team of Oxford University and Cambridge University. He also hit 6 not out for Sri Lanka in that game, holding the last wicket with Mahes Goonatilleke as the match ended in a draw. Wijesuriya took 15 first class wickets from five games on tour at a bowling average of 31.13.

== International career ==
In March the following year, Wijesuriya made his official international debut on the tour of Pakistan, bowling eight overs for 48 runs in a rain-shortened ODI and dismissing Mansoor Akhtar for 20. Following that, he was called up for the third Test against Pakistan, but he bowled 24 wicketless overs, as he was taken apart by Zaheer Abbas. Sri Lanka lost the Test by an innings and 102 runs, and Wijesuriya was quietly dropped and forgotten for three years.

Then, in 1985, he was recalled as Sri Lanka took on India. Wijesuriya took key wickets in the first ODI, removing Krish Srikkanth and Mohammad Azharuddin early, but his eight overs cost 56 runs and India eked out a two-wicket victory. He was retained, however, bowling nine overs for 54 runs in the other two matches.

=== 1985–86 Pakistan tour ===
Despite the variable performances, he was kept in the side that toured Pakistan in 1985–86. However, he went wicketless in the first two Tests, despite bowling a total of 48 overs, before finally getting his first Test wicket at Karachi. Fellow spinner Abdul Qadir was his victim, caught by Sidath Wettimuny, which finally gave him a Test bowling average. By the end of the match, however, that average had been set to 297 – where it remained, giving him the highest bowling average (for a time, West Indian Rawl Lewis overtook Wijesuriya with one wicket for more than 300 runs but more success in 2008 brought down Lewis' bowling average). He also recorded his best ODI bowling figures on that tour, taking two for 25 from five overs, and also battling out to score 12 runs after the top order had been taken apart by Mudassar Nazar, Mohsin Kamal and Abdul Qadir. Despite the credible performance from Wijesuriya, Sri Lanka lost the match by 89 runs, and they suffered a 4–0 defeat in the ODI series and lost the Test series 2–0.

== After cricket ==
That became Wijesuriya's last international performance. He played a number of matches for Sri Lanka B on Zimbabwe's tour of Sri Lanka in 1987–88, registering six wickets for 102 in a drawn game, but he never played for the senior team. He also appeared in Sri Lankan domestic cricket, playing for Moratuwa Sports Club, where he recorded his best first-class innings bowling figures with 6–51 against Galle in 1989–90, one game for Colombo Cricket Club, and finally one season for Colts Cricket Club in 1993–94.
