= 1993–94 Sri Lankan cricket season =

The 1993–94 Sri Lankan cricket season featured two Test series with Sri Lanka playing against India and West Indies.

== Honours ==
- P Saravanamuttu Trophy – Nondescripts Cricket Club
- Hatna Trophy – Bloomfield Cricket and Athletic Club
- Most runs – MAR Samarasekera 701 @ 50.07 (HS 191)
- Most wickets – AMN Munasinghe 46 @ 16.43 (BB 9-38)

== Test series ==
India won the first Test series 1–0 with 2 matches drawn:

- 1st Test @ Asgiriya Stadium, Kandy – match drawn
- 2nd Test @ Sinhalese Sports Club Ground, Colombo – India won by 235 runs
- 3rd Test @ Paikiasothy Saravanamuttu Stadium, Colombo – match drawn

The second tour featured the inaugural Test between Sri Lanka and West Indies:

- 1st Test @ Tyronne Fernando Stadium, Moratuwa – match drawn

== External sources ==
- CricInfo – brief history of Sri Lankan cricket
- CricketArchive – Tournaments in Sri Lanka
