= 2006–07 Sri Lankan cricket season =

Sri Lankan sporting season

The 2006–07 Sri Lankan cricket season featured two Test series with Sri Lanka playing against South Africa and Bangladesh.

== Honours ==
- P Saravanamuttu Trophy – Colombo Cricket Club
- Hatna Trophy – Nondescripts Cricket Club
- Most runs – BARS Priyadarshana 822 @ 43.26 (HS 140)
- Most wickets – RMGK Sirisoma 60 @ 15.50 (BB 7–42)

== Test series ==
Sri Lanka won both of the two Tests against South Africa:

- 1st Test @ Sinhalese Sports Club Ground, Colombo – Sri Lanka won by innings and 153 runs
- 2nd Test @ Paikiasothy Saravanamuttu Stadium, Colombo – Sri Lanka won by 1 wicket

Sri Lanka convincingly won all three Tests against Bangladesh by innings margins:

- 1st Test @ Sinhalese Sports Club Ground, Colombo – Sri Lanka won by an innings and 234 runs
- 2nd Test @ Paikiasothy Saravanamuttu Stadium, Colombo – Sri Lanka won by an innings and 90 runs
- 3rd Test @ Asgiriya Stadium, Kandy – Sri Lanka won by an innings and 193 runs

India was due to play a series of 3 limited overs internationals in Sri Lanka but these were abandoned because of continuous heavy rain, although play did begin in the first scheduled fixture. The only game that India could complete was a 50-over match versus the Sri Lanka A team. India won this by 3 wickets.

== External sources ==
- CricInfo – brief history of Sri Lankan cricket
- CricketArchive – Tournaments in Sri Lanka
