= 1998–99 Sri Lankan cricket season =

The 1998–99 Sri Lankan cricket season featured a Test series between Sri Lanka and India. Sri Lanka then played a further series against Australia.

== Honours ==
- Premier Trophy – Bloomfield C & AC
- Premier Limited Overs Tournament – Colts Cricket Club
- Most runs – TM Dilshan 1027 @ 51.35 (HS 194)
- Most wickets – PP Wickramasinghe 76 @ 13.01 (BB 8-47)

== Test series ==
India played in Sri Lanka as part of the 1998-99 Asian Test Championship:

- 1st Test @ Sinhalese Sports Club Ground, Colombo – match drawn

Sri Lanka won the three-match Test series against Australia 1–0 with 2 matches drawn:

- 1st Test @ Asgiriya Stadium, Kandy – Sri Lanka won by 6 wickets
- 2nd Test @ Galle International Stadium – match drawn
- 3rd Test @ Sinhalese Sports Club Ground, Colombo – match drawn

== External sources ==
- CricInfo – brief history of Sri Lankan cricket
- CricketArchive – Tournaments in Sri Lanka
