= 2008–09 Sri Lankan cricket season =

The 2008–09 Sri Lankan cricket season featured a Test series between Sri Lanka and India.

== Honours ==
- P Saravanamuttu Trophy – Colts Cricket Club
- Hatna Trophy – Bloomfield Cricket and Athletic Club
- Most runs – AD Mathews 1038 @ 79.84 (HS 270)
- Most wickets – S Weerakoon 71 @ 20.35 (BB 7–40) and S Prasanna 71 @ 20.70 (BB 8–59)

== Test series ==
Sri Lanka won the Test series against India by 2–1:

- 1st Test @ Sinhalese Sports Club Ground, Colombo – Sri Lanka won by innings and 135 runs
- 2nd Test @ Galle International Stadium, Galle – India won by 170 runs
- 3rd Test @ Paikiasothy Saravanamuttu Stadium, Colombo – Sri Lanka won by 8 wickets

== External sources ==
- CricInfo – brief history of Sri Lankan cricket
- CricketArchive – Tournaments in Sri Lanka
