= Suranga Arunakumara =

Sri Lankan cricketer (born 1978)

Suranga Arunakumara (full name Gonapinu Walavithanage Suranga Arunakumara; born 21 August 1978) is a former Sri Lankan cricketer. He was born in Kohuwala. He has played for the Sinhalese Sports Club in the domestic game and internationally he has not played. He was a left-arm medium pace bowler in 18 first-class matches from the 1997–98 season to 2001–02 and took 30 wickets. His best bowling was 5–79.

Arunakumara made his first-class debut in December 1997 when he played in the 1997–98 Hatna Trophy for the Sinhalese against the Tamil Union Cricket and Athletic Club. His last match was in February 2002 in the 2001–02 Premier Trophy for the Sinhalese against the Moors Sports Club.
