= 2004–05 Sri Lankan cricket season =

The 2004–05 Sri Lankan cricket season featured two Test series with Sri Lanka playing against South Africa and West Indies.

== Honours ==
- Premier Trophy – Colts Cricket Club
- Premier Limited Overs Tournament – cancelled
- Most runs – S Kalavitigoda 885 @ 49.16 (HS 152)
- Most wickets – S Weerakoon 52 @ 20.80 (BB 7–81)

== Test series ==
Sri Lanka won the Test series against South Africa 1–0 with 1 match drawn:

- 1st Test @ Galle International Stadium – match drawn
- 2nd Test @ Sinhalese Sports Club Ground, Colombo – Sri Lanka won by 313 runs

Sri Lanka won both matches in the two-Test series against West Indies:

- 1st Test @ Sinhalese Sports Club Ground, Colombo – Sri Lanka by 6 wickets
- 2nd Test @ Asgiriya Stadium, Kandy – Sri Lanka by 240 runs

== External sources ==
- "A brief history". CricInfo – brief history of Sri Lankan cricket
- "The Home of CricketArchive". CricketArchive – Tournaments in Sri Lanka
