= 2000–01 Sri Lankan cricket season =

The 2000–01 Sri Lankan cricket season featured a Test series between Sri Lanka and England.

== Honours ==
- Premier Trophy – Nondescripts Cricket Club
- Premier Limited Overs Tournament – Sinhalese Sports Club
- Most runs – RPAH Wickramaratne 830 @ 51.87 (HS 139)
- Most wickets – S Weerakoon 80 @ 12.97 (BB 7–51)

== Test series ==
England played 3 Tests and won the series 2–1:

- 1st Test @ Galle International Stadium – Sri Lanka won by an innings and 28 runs
- 2nd Test @ Asgiriya Stadium, Kandy – England won by 3 wickets
- 3rd Test @ Sinhalese Sports Club Ground, Colombo – England won by 4 wickets

== External sources ==
- "A brief history". CricInfo – brief history of Sri Lankan cricket
- "The Home of CricketArchive". CricketArchive – Tournaments in Sri
