= International cricket in 1993 =

International cricket season

The 1993 International cricket season was from May 1993 to September 1993.

== Season overview ==
International tours
| Start date | Home team | Away team | Results [Matches] | | | |
| Start date | Home team | Away team | Test | ODI | FC | LA |
|---|---|---|---|---|---|---|
| 19 May 1993 | England | Australia | 1–4 [6] | 0–3 [3] | — | — |
| 17 July 1993 | Sri Lanka | India | 0–1 [3] | 2–1 [3] | — | — |
| 22 August 1993 | Sri Lanka | South Africa | 0–1 [3] | 1–1 [3] | — | — |

== May ==
=== Australia in England ===
ODI series
| No. | Date | Home captain | Away captain | Venue | Result |
|---|---|---|---|---|---|
| ODI 830 | 19 May | Graham Gooch | Allan Border | Old Trafford Cricket Ground, Manchester | Australia by 4 runs |
| ODI 831 | 21 May | Graham Gooch | Allan Border | Edgbaston Cricket Ground, Birmingham | Australia by 6 wickets |
| ODI 832 | 23 May | Graham Gooch | Mark Taylor | Lord's, London | Australia by 19 runs |
The Ashes - Test series
| No. | Date | Home captain | Away captain | Venue | Result |
| Test 1223 | 3–7 June | Graham Gooch | Allan Border | Old Trafford Cricket Ground, Manchester | Australia by 179 runs |
| Test 1224 | 17–21 June | Graham Gooch | Allan Border | Lord's, London | Australia by an innings and 62 runs |
| Test 1225 | 1–6 July | Graham Gooch | Allan Border | Trent Bridge, Nottingham, London | Match drawn |
| Test 1227 | 22–26 July | Graham Gooch | Allan Border | Headingley Cricket Ground, Leeds | Australia by an innings and 148 runs |
| Test 1230 | 5–9 August | Mike Atherton | Allan Border | Edgbaston, Birmingham | Australia by 8 wickets |
| Test 1231 | 19–23 August | Mike Atherton | Allan Border | Kennington Oval, London | England by 161 runs |

== July ==
=== India in Sri Lanka ===
Test series
| No. | Date | Home captain | Away captain | Venue | Result |
|---|---|---|---|---|---|
| Test 1226 | 17–22 July | Arjuna Ranatunga | Mohammad Azharuddin | Asgiriya Stadium, Kandy | Match drawn |
| Test 1228 | 27 July-1 August | Arjuna Ranatunga | Mohammad Azharuddin | Sinhalese Sports Club Ground, Colombo | India by 235 runs |
| Test 1229 | 4–9 August | Arjuna Ranatunga | Mohammad Azharuddin | P Sara Oval, Colombo | Match drawn |
ODI series
| No. | Date | Home captain | Away captain | Venue | Result |
| ODI 833 | 25 July | Arjuna Ranatunga | Mohammad Azharuddin | R Premadasa Stadium, Colombo | India by 1 run |
| ODI 834 | 12 August | Arjuna Ranatunga | Mohammad Azharuddin | R Premadasa Stadium, Colombo | Sri Lanka by 8 runs |
| ODI 835 | 14 August | Arjuna Ranatunga | Mohammad Azharuddin | Tyronne Fernando Stadium, Moratuwa | Sri Lanka by 4 wickets |

== August ==
=== South Africa in Sri Lanka ===
ODI series
| No. | Date | Home captain | Away captain | Venue | Result |
|---|---|---|---|---|---|
| ODI 836 | 22 August | Arjuna Ranatunga | Kepler Wessels | Asgiriya Stadium, Kandy | No result |
| ODI 837 | 2 September | Arjuna Ranatunga | Kepler Wessels | R Premadasa Stadium, Colombo | South Africa by 124 runs |
| ODI 838 | 4 September | Arjuna Ranatunga | Kepler Wessels | R Premadasa Stadium, Colombo | Sri Lanka by 44 runs |
Test series
| No. | Date | Home captain | Away captain | Venue | Result |
| Test 1232 | 25–30 August | Arjuna Ranatunga | Kepler Wessels | Tyronne Fernando Stadium, Moratuwa | Match drawn |
| Test 1233 | 6–10 September | Arjuna Ranatunga | Kepler Wessels | Sinhalese Sports Club Ground, Colombo | South Africa by an innings and 208 runs |
| Test 1234 | 14–19 September | Arjuna Ranatunga | Kepler Wessels | P Sara Oval, Colombo | Match drawn |
