= 2003–04 Sri Lankan cricket season =

The 2003–04 Sri Lankan cricket season featured two Test series with Sri Lanka playing against England and Australia.

== Honours ==
- Premier Trophy – Bloomfield C & AC
- Premier Limited Overs Tournament – Bloomfield Cricket and Athletic Club
- Most runs – TM Dilshan 1284 @ 51.36 (HS 151)
- Most wickets – M Muralitharan 96 @ 14.40 (BB 7–46)

== Test series ==
Sri Lanka won the 3 match Test series against England 1–0 and also 4 limited overs internationals, one of which was the Bungle in the jungle. Sri Lanka won the Test series by winning 1 of the 3 matches with 2 drawn:

- 1st Test (Galle International Stadium) – match drawn
- 2nd Test (Asgiriya Stadium, Kandy) – match drawn
- 3rd Test (Sinhalese Sports Club Ground, Colombo) – Sri Lanka won by an innings and 215 runs

Australia won the Test series 3–0 after Sri Lankan led in the 1st innings of each match by substantial amounts:

- 1st Test @ Galle International Stadium – Australia won by 197 runs
- 2nd Test @ Asgiriya Stadium, Kandy – Australia won by 27 runs
- 3rd Test @ Sinhalese Sports Club Ground, Colombo – Australia won by 121 runs

== External sources ==
- "A brief history". CricInfo – brief history of Sri Lankan cricket
- "The Home of CricketArchive". CricketArchive – Tournaments in Sri Lanka
