= Dunil Abeydeera =

Sri Lankan cricketer (born 1984)

Dunil Abeydeera (full name Ruchintha Dunilkumara Abeydeera; born 28 September 1984) is a Sri Lankan cricketer. He was born in Colombo. He played for the Sinhalese Sports Club, the Singha Sports Club and the Badureliya Sports Club teams in the domestic game and internationally he played for the under-19s in 2003. He was a bowler in 53 first-class matches from the 2005–06 season to 2009–10 and took exactly 100 wickets. He bowled slow left-arm orthodox spin but was a right-handed batsman. His best bowling was 5–20 and his highest score was 47 runs.

Abeydeera made his first-class debut in December 2005 when he played for the Sinhalese in the 2005–06 Premier Trophy against the Lankan Cricket Club. Sinhalese won the title that season. His last match was in January 2011 in the 2010–11 Premier Limited Overs Tournament for the Badureliya Sports Club against the Colombo Cricket Club.
