= 1991–92 Sri Lankan cricket season =

The 1991–92 Sri Lankan cricket season featured a Test series with Sri Lanka playing against Australia.

== Honours ==
- P Saravanamuttu Trophy – Colts Cricket Club
- Hatna Trophy – Nomads Sports Club
- Most runs – MC Mendis 551 @ 78.71 (HS 177*)
- Most wickets – GP Wickramasinghe 38 @ 13.10 (BB 10–41)

== Test series ==
Australia won the three-match Test series 1–0 with 2 draws:

- 1st Test @ Sinhalese Sports Club Ground, Colombo – Australia won by 16 runs
- 2nd Test @ R Premadasa Stadium, Colombo – match drawn
- 3rd Test @ Tyronne Fernando Stadium, Moratuwa – match drawn

== External sources ==
- CricInfo – brief history of Sri Lankan cricket
- CricketArchive – Tournaments in Sri Lanka
