= 1992–93 Sri Lankan cricket season =

The 1992–93 Sri Lankan cricket season featured three Test series with Sri Lanka playing against New Zealand, England and South Africa.

== Honours ==
- P Saravanamuttu Trophy – Sinhalese Sports Club
- Hatna Trophy – no competition
- Most runs – PA de Silva 591 @ 53.72 (HS 143)
- Most wickets – CM Hathurusingha 35 @ 16.65 (BB 8-40)

== Test series ==
Sri Lanka won the Test series against New Zealand 1–0 with 1 match drawn:

- 1st Test @ Tyronne Fernando Stadium, Moratuwa – match drawn
- 2nd Test @ Sinhalese Sports Club Ground, Colombo – Sri Lanka won by 9 wickets

Sri Lanka won the only Test played against England:

- 1st Test @ Sinhalese Sports Club Ground, Colombo – Sri Lanka won by 5 wickets

With South Africa now re-established in international sport, its national team made an inaugural tour of Sri Lanka in 1993 and played 3 Tests. South Africa won the series 1–0 with 2 matches drawn:

- 1st Test @ Tyronne Fernando Stadium, Moratuwa – match drawn
- 2nd Test @ Sinhalese Sports Club Ground, Colombo – South Africa won by innings and 208 runs
- 3rd Test @ Paikiasothy Saravanamuttu Stadium, Colombo – match drawn

== External sources ==
- CricInfo – brief history of Sri Lankan cricket
- CricketArchive – Tournaments in Sri Lanka
