= International cricket record by Sri Lanka on home grounds =

In team sports, the term home advantage – also called home ground, home field, home court, or home ice advantage – describes the benefit that the home team is said to gain over the visiting team. This benefit has been attributed to psychological effects supporting fans have on the competitors or referees; to psychological or physiological advantages of playing near home in familiar; to the disadvantages away teams suffer from changing time zones or climates, or from the rigors of travel; and, in some sports, to specific rules that favor the home team directly or indirectly.

Cricket is the most popular sport in Sri Lanka. The country has eight grounds that have been used to host international cricket matches. CCC ground hosted only Test matches, and Rangiri Dambulla International Stadium hosted only ODI matches. Besides them, Mahinda Rajapaksa International Stadium hosted only ODIs and T20Is up to date. Five grounds hosted all three forms of the game.

In cricket, hosts have the home advantage in playing international cricket. They can prepare the grounds for their suitability and according to the abilities of their players. Therefore each cricketing nation play well in their home grounds than other international venues. This home advantage can be very serious in major international tours such as ICC Cricket World Cup, ICC World Twenty20, ICC Champions Trophy and Asia Cup, which is a real boost to win the tournament. The record of Sri Lanka in their home grounds is no such difference. They have played more games and won more games in their home soil.

== Record by format ==
Test Cricket
	Matches	Won	Lost	NR/D	Win %
Paikiasothy Saravanamuttu Stadium	21	9	8	-/4	42.85
Asgiriya Stadium	21	7	9	-/5	33.33
Sinhalese Sports Club Ground	43	20	9	-/14	46.51
Colombo Cricket Club Ground	3	1	1	-/1	33.33
R. Premadasa Stadium	9	4	1	-/4	44.44
De Soysa Stadium	4	0	0	-/4	00.00
Galle International Stadium	41	23	12	-/6	56.09
Pallekele International Cricket Stadium	9	2	3	-/4	22.22

ODI Cricket
Ground	Matches	Won	Lost	T/NR	Win %
Paikiasothy Saravanamuttu Stadium	12	8	2	-/2	80.00
Asgiriya Stadium	5	3	1	-/1	75.00
Sinhalese Sports Club Ground	40	24	11	-/5	68.57
R. Premadasa Stadium	120	74	39	-/7	65.48
De Soysa Stadium	5	3	1	-/1	75.00
Galle International Stadium	5	3	2	-/-	60.00
Pallekele International Cricket Stadium	28	14	14	-/-	50.00
Rangiri Dambulla International Stadium	45	25	17	-/3	59.52
Mahinda Rajapaksa International Stadium	20	9	8	-/3	52.94

T20I Cricket
Ground	Matches	Won	Lost	T/NR	Win %
R. Premadasa Stadium	28	6	22	-/-	21.42
Pallekele International Cricket Stadium	17	9	6	1/1	59.37
Mahinda Rajapaksa International Stadium	6	3	3	-/-	50.00

- Updated: 19 August 2022
