= 2002–03 Sri Lankan cricket season =

The 2002–03 Sri Lankan cricket season featured two Test series with Sri Lanka playing against Bangladesh and New Zealand.

== Honours ==
- Premier Trophy – Moors Sports Club
- Premier Limited Overs Tournament – Bloomfield Cricket and Athletic Club
- Most runs – SKL de Silva 938 @ 42.63 (HS 133)
- Most wickets – PN Ranjith 69 @ 17.10 (BB 6–27)

== Test series ==
Bangladesh made its first Test tour of Sri Lanka in July–August 2002, playing 2 Tests and 3 LOIs. Sri Lanka won the Test series 2–0:

- 1st Test @ Paikiasothy Saravanamuttu Stadium, Colombo – Sri Lanka won by an innings and 196 runs
- 2nd Test @ Sinhalese Sports Club Ground, Colombo – Sri Lanka won by 288 runs

Sri Lanka and New Zealand played 2 Tests which were both drawn:

- 1st Test @ Paikiasothy Saravanamuttu Stadium, Colombo – match drawn
- 2nd Test @ Asgiriya Stadium, Kandy – match drawn

== External sources ==
- "A brief history". CricInfo – brief history of Sri Lankan cricket
- "The Home of CricketArchive". CricketArchive – Tournaments in Sri Lanka
