= Mohamed Aslam (cricketer) =

Sri Lankan cricketer (born 1980)

Mohamed Aslam (full name Mohamed Ajward Mohamed Aslam; born 3 April 1980) is a former Sri Lankan cricketer. He was born in Kandy. He has played for the Sinhalese Sports Club in the domestic game and internationally he has not played. He was a right-arm fast medium pace bowler in 23 first-class matches from the 1999–2000 season to 2001–02 and took 48 wickets. His best bowling was 5–50.

Aslam made his first-class debut in November 1999 when he played in the 1999–2000 Premier Trophy for the Sinhalese against the Colts Cricket Club. His last match was in November 2001 in the 2001–02 Premier Trophy for the Sinhalese, also against the Colts.
