= 1994–95 Sri Lankan cricket season =

The 1994–95 Sri Lankan cricket season featured a Test series with Sri Lanka playing against Pakistan.

== Honours ==
- P Saravanamuttu Trophy – Sinhalese Sports Club and Bloomfield Cricket and Athletic Club shared the title
- Hatna Trophy – no competition
- Most runs – MS Atapattu 1302 @ 93.00 (HS 181)
- Most wickets – SD Anurasiri 78 @ 15.67 (BB 8-90)

== Test series ==
Pakistan won the Test series 2-0:

- 1st Test @ Paikiasothy Saravanamuttu Stadium, Colombo – Pakistan won by 301 runs
- 2nd Test @ Asgiriya Stadium, Kandy – Pakistan won by an innings and 52 runs
- 3rd Test @ Sinhalese Sports Club Ground, Colombo – game abandoned

== External sources ==
- CricInfo – brief history of Sri Lankan cricket
- CricketArchive – Tournaments in Sri Lanka
