= 2005–06 Sri Lankan cricket season =

The 2005–06 Sri Lankan cricket season featured two Test series with Sri Lanka playing against Pakistan and Bangladesh.

== Honours ==
- Premier Trophy – Sinhalese Sports Club
- Premier Limited Overs Tournament – Bloomfield Cricket and Athletic Club
- Most runs – WMG Ramyakumara 993 @ 62.06 (HS 150*)
- Most wickets – SADU Indrasiri 60 @ 13.55 (BB 7-61)

== Test series ==
Pakistan toured Sri Lanka in March and April 2006 to play two Tests and three limited overs internationals. Pakistan won the Test series 1–0 with 1 match drawn:

- 1st Test @ Sinhalese Sports Club Ground, Colombo – match drawn
- 2nd Test @ Asgiriya Stadium, Kandy – Pakistan won by 8 wickets

Pakistan won the 3 match ODI series 2–0 with one match abandoned.

Sri Lanka won both Test matches against Bangladesh by an innings:

- 1st Test @ R Premadasa Stadium, Colombo – Sri Lanka by innings and 96 runs
- 2nd Test @ Paikiasothy Saravanamuttu Stadium, Colombo – Sri Lanka by innings and 69 runs

== External sources ==
- CricInfo – brief history of Sri Lankan cricket
- CricketArchive – Tournaments in Sri Lanka
