= 2001–02 Sri Lankan cricket season =

The 2001–02 Sri Lankan cricket season featured three Test series with Sri Lanka playing against Zimbabwe, Bangladesh and West Indies.

== Honours ==
- Premier Trophy – Colts Cricket Club
- Premier Limited Overs Tournament – Nondescripts Cricket Club
- Most runs – DPMD Jayawardene 1426 @ 89.12 (HS 274)
- Most wickets – M Muralitharan 87 @ 13.47 (BB 9-51)

== Test series ==
Sri Lanka won the Test series against Zimbabwe 3-0:

- 1st Test @ Sinhalese Sports Club Ground, Colombo – Sri Lanka won by an innings and 166 runs
- 2nd Test @ Asgiriya Stadium, Kandy – Sri Lanka won by an innings and 94 runs
- 3rd Test @ Galle International Stadium – Sri Lanka won by 315 runs

Bangladesh had achieved Test status in November 2000 and first played Sri Lanka in September 2001 as part of the 2001-02 Asian Test Championship:

- 1st Test @ Sinhalese Sports Club Ground, Colombo – Sri Lanka won by an innings and 137 runs

Sri Lanka won the Test series against West Indies 3-0:

- 1st Test @ Galle International Stadium – Sri Lanka won by 10 wickets
- 2nd Test @ Asgiriya Stadium, Kandy – Sri Lanka won by 131 runs
- 3rd Test @ Sinhalese Sports Club Ground, Colombo – Sri Lanka won by 10 wickets

== External sources ==
- CricInfo – brief history of Sri Lankan cricket
- CricketArchive – Tournaments in Sri Lanka
