= 1997–98 Sri Lankan cricket season =

The 1997–98 Sri Lankan cricket season featured two Test series with Sri Lanka playing against Zimbabwe and New Zealand.

== Honours ==
- P Saravanamuttu Trophy – Sinhalese Sports Club
- Hatna Trophy – Nondescripts Cricket Club
- Most runs – MS Atapattu 868 @ 96.44 (HS 223)
- Most wickets – UC Hathurusingha 35 @ 16.17 (BB 7-55)

== Test series ==
Sri Lanka won the Test series against Zimbabwe 2–0:

- 1st Test @ Asgiriya Stadium, Kandy – Sri Lanka won by 8 wickets
- 2nd Test @ Sinhalese Sports Club Ground, Colombo – Sri Lanka won by 5 wickets

Sri Lanka won the Test series against New Zealand 2–1:

- 1st Test @ R Premadasa Stadium, Colombo – New Zealand won by 167 runs
- 2nd Test @ Galle International Stadium – Sri Lanka won by an innings and 16 runs
- 3rd Test @ Sinhalese Sports Club Ground, Colombo – Sri Lanka won by 164 runs

== External sources ==
- CricInfo – brief history of Sri Lankan cricket
- CricketArchive – Tournaments in Sri Lanka
