= Stefan Anthonisz =

Sri Lankan cricketer (born 1963)

Stefan Anthonisz (full name Stefan Leonard Anthonisz; born 13 April 1963) is a former Sri Lankan cricketer. He was born in Colombo. He has played for the Sinhalese Sports Club in the domestic game and internationally he played for the Colts in 1986 and for the Sri Lanka B in 1989. He was a right-handed batsman in 21 first-class matches from the 1985–86 season to 1991–92 and scored 675 runs. His highest score was 91. He bowled rarely.

Anthonisz made his first-class debut in January 1986 when he played for the Sri Lanka Colts against the England B team. His last match was in December 1991 in the 1991–92 Saravanamuttu Trophy for the Sinhalese against the Colts Cricket Club.
