= English cricket team in Sri Lanka in 2003–04 =

International cricket tour

English cricket team in Sri Lanka in 2003-04
	Sri Lanka	England
- Dates: 15 November – 21 December 2003
Captains	Hashan Tillakaratne (Tests); Marvan Atapattu (ODIs)	Michael Vaughan

Test series
- Result: Sri Lanka won the 3-match series 1–0
Most runs	Mahela Jayawardene (334)	Michael Vaughan (221)
Most wickets	Muttiah Muralitharan (26)	Ashley Giles (18)
- Player of the series: Muttiah Muralitharan (SL)

One Day International series
- Results: Sri Lanka won the 3-match series 1–0
Most runs	Sanath Jayasuriya (46)	Paul Collingwood (31)
Most wickets	Chaminda Vaas (3)	No wickets taken
- Player of the series: Chaminda Vaas (SL)

Sri Lanka won the 3 match series 1-0 and 4 limited overs matches, one of which was the Bungle in the jungle.

Sri Lanka won the Test series by winning 1 of the 3 matches with 2 drawn:

- 1st Test (Galle International Stadium) – match drawn
- 2nd Test (Asgiriya Stadium, Kandy) – match drawn
- 3rd Test (Sinhalese Sports Club Ground, Colombo) – Sri Lanka won by an innings and 215 runs

== One Day Internationals (ODIs) ==
=== 1st ODI ===
18 November 2003 (D/N)
Scorecard

England; 88 (46.1 overs)	v	Sri Lanka; 89/0 (13.5 overs)
PD Collingwood 31 (96); WPUJC Vaas 3/15 (9.1 overs)		ST Jayasuriya 46* (41)

Sri Lanka won by 10 wickets
Rangiri Dambulla International Stadium, Dambulla
Umpires: DJ Harper (AUS) and TH Wijewardene (SL)
Player of the match: WPUJC Vaas (SL)

- England won the toss and elected to bat.
- AJ Strauss (ENG), and KADM Fernando and KMDN Kulasekara (both SL) made their ODI debuts.

=== 2nd ODI ===
21 November 2003 (D/N)
Scorecard

Sri Lanka	v	England

Match abandoned
R. Premadasa Stadium, Colombo
Umpires: DJ Harper (AUS) and PT Manuel (SL)

=== 3rd ODI ===
23 November 2003
Scorecard

Sri Lanka	v	England

Match abandoned
R. Premadasa Stadium, Colombo
Umpires: DJ Harper (AUS) and TH Wijewardene (SL)

== Test series summary ==
=== 1st Test ===
2–6 December 2003
Scorecard

Sri Lanka	v	England
331 (127.5 overs); KC Sangakkara 71 (142); AF Giles 4/69 (32.5 overs)		235 (100.4 overs); MA Butcher 51 (207); M Muralitharan 7/46 (31.4 overs)
226 (97.2 overs); DPMD Jayawardene 86* (242); AF Giles 4/63 (40 overs)		210/9 (108 overs); MA Butcher 54 (132); M Muralitharan 4/47 (37 overs)

Match drawn
Galle International Stadium, Galle
Umpires: DJ Harper (AUS) and S Venkataraghavan (IND)
Player of the match: M Muralitharan (SL)

- Sri Lanka won the toss and elected to bat.
- PD Collingwood (ENG) and KADM Fernando (SL) made their Test debuts

=== 2nd Test ===
10–14 December 2003
Scorecard

Sri Lanka	v	England
382 (126.4 overs); TM Dilshan 63 (94); AF Giles 5/116 (37.4 overs)		294 (114.2 overs); GP Thorpe 57 (198); M Muralitharan 4/60 (40 overs)
279/7dec (71 overs); TM Dilshan 100 (129); AF Giles 3/101 (22 overs)		285/7 (140 overs); MP Vaughan 105 (333); M Muralitharan 4/64 (56 overs)

Match drawn
Asgiriya Stadium, Kandy
Umpires: Aleem Dar (PAK) and DJ Harper (AUS)
Player of the match: MP Vaughan (ENG)

- Sri Lanka won the toss and elected to bat.

=== 3rd Test ===
18–21 December 2003
Scorecard

England	v	Sri Lanka
265 (101 overs); A Flintoff 77 (109); M Muralitharan 3/40 (40 overs)		628/8dec (182 overs); TT Samaraweera 142 (408); A Flintoff 2/47 (18 overs)
148 (68 overs); MA Butcher 37 (119); M Muralitharan 4/63 (27 overs)

Sri Lanka won by an innings and 215 runs
Singhalese Sports Club Cricket Ground, Colombo
Umpires: Aleem Dar (PAK) and SA Bucknor (WI)
Player of the match: TT Samaraweera (SL)

- England won the toss and elected to bat.
- The match was scheduled for five days but completed in four.

== Tour matches ==
=== One-day: Sri Lanka Cricket President's XI v England XI ===
15 November 2003
Scorecard

England XI; 237/8 (38 overs)	v	Sri Lanka Cricket President's XI; 76/1 (17.1 overs)
Andrew Strauss 83 (88); Nandika Ranjith 2/32 (8 overs)		Michael Vandort 39 (59); James Kirtley 1/12 (4 overs)

No result
Tyronne Fernando Stadium, Moratuwa
Umpires: Grashan Liyanage (SL) and Ranmore Martinesz (SL)

- England XI won the toss and elected to bat.
- Rain reduced the number of overs to 38 per side and caused the game to be abandoned.

=== First-class: Sri Lanka Cricket President's XI vs England XI ===
26–28 November 2003
Scorecard

Sri Lanka Cricket President's XI	v	England XI
181 (67.5 overs); Bathiya Perera 55* (125); James Kirtley 4/41 (14 overs)		314/9d (71.3 overs); Mark Butcher 151* (219); Dilhara Fernando 3/79 (21 overs)
135/4 (44 overs); Michael Vandort 42 (46); Robert Croft 1/18 (7 overs)

Match drawn
Colombo Cricket Club Ground, Colombo
Umpires: Gamini Dissanayake (SL) and CBC Rodrigo (SL)

- Sri Lanka Board XI won the toss and elected to bat.
