= 1999–2000 Sri Lankan cricket season =

The 1999–2000 Sri Lankan cricket season featured a Test series between Sri Lanka and India. Sri Lanka then played a further series against Pakistan.

== Honours ==
- Premier Trophy – Colts Cricket Club
- Premier Limited Overs Tournament – Tamil Union Cricket and Athletic Club
- Most runs – DA Gunawardene 711 @ 41.82 (HS 140)
- Most wickets – D Hettiarachchi 55 @ 15.09 (BB 5-20)

== Test series ==
The series with South Africa ended 1–1 with 1 match drawn:

- 1st Test @ Galle International Stadium – Sri Lanka won by innings and 15 runs
- 2nd Test @ Asgiriya Stadium, Kandy – South Africa won by 7 runs
- 3rd Test @ Sinhalese Sports Club Ground, Colombo – match drawn

The Pakistan team in Sri Lanka in 2000 played 3 Tests and a LOI tri-series. Pakistan won the Test series against Sri Lanka by 2–0 with one match drawn:

- 1st Test (Sinhalese Sports Club Ground, Colombo) – Pakistan won by 5 wickets
- 2nd Test (Galle International Stadium) – Pakistan won by an innings and 163 runs
- 3rd Test (Asgiriya Stadium, Kandy) – match drawn

== External sources ==
- CricInfo – brief history of Sri Lankan cricket
- CricketArchive – Tournaments in Sri Lanka
