= 1988–89 Sri Lankan cricket season =

The 1988–89 Sri Lankan cricket season marked the beginning of domestic first-class cricket in the country.

== Honours ==
- Lakspray Trophy – Nondescripts Cricket Club & Sinhalese Sports Club shared title
- Brown's Trophy – Sinhalese Sports Club
- Most runs – DSBP Kuruppu 339 @ 113.00 (HS 126)
- Most wickets – SD Anurasiri 24 @ 13.12 (BB 8–53)

== Test series ==
Sri Lanka played no home Test matches this season.

== External sources ==
- "A brief history". CricInfo – brief history of Sri Lankan cricket
- "The Home of CricketArchive". CricketArchive – Tournaments in Sri Lanka
