= Wirantha Fernando =

Sri Lankan cricketer

Personal information
- Born: 6 February 1959; Ceylon
- Died: 17 April 2000 (aged 41); Colombo, Sri Lanka
- Batting: Right-handed
- Role: Batsman

Domestic team information
- Years: Team
- 1989–1990: Colts Cricket Club
- 1993: Moratuwa Sports Club

Career statistics
Competition	First-class
Matches	13
Runs scored	501
Batting average	38.53
100s/50s	1/4
Top score	111
Catches/stumpings	5/–
- Source: CricketArchive

Wirantha Fernando (6 February 1959 – 17 April 2000) was a Sri Lankan first-class cricketer and politician.

== Cricket career ==
Fernando, who went to Prince of Wales' College in Moratuwa, captained the Combined Schools team in his youth. He represented the Sri Lanka Under-19 cricket team in a tour of Pakistan in 1976 and again in 1978, when the Australia Under-19 cricket team came to the island.

A right-handed middle-order batsman, Fernando played for the Colts Cricket Club throughout the 1980s and had the distinction of captaining them in all five matches they played in the 1988/89 Lakspray Trophy, the first time the tournament had first-class status. He was the club's leading run-scorer that season with 208 runs at 52.00, which included three half-centuries.

In the 1989/90 Lakspray Trophy, Fernando handed over the captaincy to Rupanath Wickramaratne and amassed only 130 runs in the three matches he played, but did score his maiden first-class century, an innings of 111 against Moratuwa Sports Club at the Colts Cricket Club Ground.

Fernando didn't play at first-class level in either of the next two seasons, then returned in 1992/93, with the Moratuwa Sports Club. He appeared in all five matches of Moratuwa's Saravanamuttu Trophy campaign, which saw them not lose a match and finish second in Group B. His own contributions were minimal, making 163 runs at 32.60.

== Politics ==
A member of the People's Alliance, Fernando served as the Minister of Fisheries in the Western Provincial Council.

== Murder ==
On the night of 14 April 2000, after a visit to Chilaw Hospital, Wirantha arrived at his sister-in-law's house in Kurana and along with his driver was involved in a confrontation with two cyclists. The cyclists later returned to the house, in a mob of 20 people, armed with knives and swords. They made their way into the house and attacked the residents. Fernando was the most seriously injured and was taken to Colombo National Hospital, where he later died.
