= 1995–96 Sri Lankan cricket season =

The 1995–96 Sri Lankan cricket season featured a Test series with Sri Lanka playing against Zimbabwe.

== Honours ==
- P Saravanamuttu Trophy – Colombo Cricket Club
- Hatna Trophy – Nondescripts Cricket Club
- Most runs – RP Arnold 1430 @ 79.44 (HS 217*)
- Most wickets – M Jayasena 67 @ 21.41 (BB 5-72)

== Test series ==
Sri Lanka won the Test series 2-0:

- 1st Test @ R Premadasa Stadium, Colombo – Sri Lanka won by an innings and 77 runs
- 2nd Test @ Sinhalese Sports Club Ground, Colombo – Sri Lanka won by 10 wickets

== External sources ==
- CricInfo – brief history of Sri Lankan cricket
- CricketArchive – Tournaments in Sri Lanka
