= Rajitha Amunugama =

Sri Lankan cricketer (born 1969)

Rajith Amunugama
Personal information
- Full name: Amunugama Rajapakse Rajakaruna Abeykoon Panditha Wasalamudiyanse Ralahamilage Rajitha Krishantha Bandara Amunugama
- Born: 22 April 1969 (age 57); Mawanella, Sri Lanka

Amunugama Rajapakse Rajakaruna Abeykoon Panditha Wasalamudiyanse Ralahamilage Rajith Krishantha Bandara Amunugama, also known as Rajitha Amunugama (born 22 April 1969 in Mawanella, Sri Lanka) is a former Sri Lankan cricketer. He was a left-handed batsman and bowled right-arm medium pace. His first-class cricket career consisted of 102 matches played mainly for the Tamil Union Club and Kurunegala Youth.

He began his cricketing career for Sri Lanka Young Cricketers at the 1988 Youth Cricket World Cup, where he played against New Zealand Young Cricketers and an ICC Associate Member team made of players from the non-Test sides. However, he had a forgettable tournament, scoring one run in his only innings and conceding 44 runs off eight overs. He was, however, a regular for various province teams in the President's Trophy tournament, but after 1994-95 he struggled to get regular first team cricket.

However, after taking eight wickets for 63 runs in a match in the Sri Lankan Cricket Premier League, his bowling figures were mentioned in the Notes by the Editor in the Wisden Cricketers' Almanack 2004—not particularly because of the achievement, but because of the uncanny number of initials, which prompted the rhetorical question: "Is this an elaborate joke, along the lines of Llanfairpwllgwyngyllgogerychwyrndrobwllllantysiliogogogoch?". Amunugama had also been mentioned in the 1992 Almanack, with match figures of 12 for 91 against Sebastianites, but then under the name of R. K. B. Amanugama, which according to the Wisden editor seemed to confirm the joke.
