= Geeth =

Geeth is a given name. Notable people with the name include:

- Geeth Alwis (born 1987), Sri Lankan cricketer
- Geeth Kumara (born 1988), Sri Lankan cricketer
- Geeth Perera (born 1996), Sri Lankan cricketer
- Geeth Silva (born 1983), Sri Lankan cricketer
