= 2007–08 Sri Lankan cricket season =

The 2007–08 Sri Lankan cricket season featured a Test series between Sri Lanka and England.

== Honours ==
- P Saravanamuttu Trophy – Sinhalese Sports Club
- Hatna Trophy – Sinhalese Sports Club
- Most runs – NT Paranavitana 1059 @ 81.46 (HS 236)
- Most wickets – BAW Mendis 68 @ 10.51 (BB 7–37)

== Test series ==
Sri Lanka won the Test series against England 1–0 with two matches drawn:

- 1st Test @ Asgiriya Stadium, Kandy – Sri Lanka won by 88 runs
- 2nd Test @ Sinhalese Sports Club Ground, Colombo – match drawn
- 3rd Test @ Galle International Stadium, Galle – match drawn

== External sources ==
- CricInfo – brief history of Sri Lankan cricket
- CricketArchive – Tournaments in Sri Lanka
