= Lashan Egalahewa =

Sri Lankan cricketer

Lashan Egalahewa was a Sri Lankan cricketer. He was a left-arm medium-fast bowler who played for Colts Cricket Club.

Egalahewa made a single first-class appearance for the side, during the 1988–89 season, against Sri Lanka Air Force. From the tailend, he scored 2 runs in the only innings in which he batted.

Egalahewa bowled ten overs in the match, conceding 31 runs.
