= Dinesh Lalintha =

Sri Lankan cricketer

Dinesh Lalintha was a Sri Lankan cricketer. He was a right-handed batsman and right-arm medium-pace bowler who played for Nondescripts Cricket Club.

Lalintha made a single first-class appearance for the team, during the 1999–2000 season, against Kurunegala YCC. In the only innings in which he batted, he scored a duck.

Lalintha took figures of 2-19 from seven overs of bowling.
