= Polonowita =

Polonowita is a surname. Notable people with the surname include:

- Anurudda Polonowita (born 1938), Ceylonese cricketer
- Anushka Polonowita (born 1977), Sri Lankan cricketer
