= 1996–97 Sri Lankan cricket season =

The 1996–97 Sri Lankan cricket season featured two Test series with Sri Lanka playing against Pakistan and India.

== Honours ==
- P Saravanamuttu Trophy – Bloomfield Cricket and Athletic Club
- Hatna Trophy – Bloomfield Cricket and Athletic Club
- Most runs – RS Kaluwitharana 1172 @ 73.25 (HS 179)
- Most wickets – ADB Ranjith 70 @ 16.40 (BB 9-29)

== Test series ==
The Sri Lanka v Pakistan series ended 0–0 with both matches drawn:

- 1st Test @ R Premadasa Stadium, Colombo – match drawn
- 2nd Test @ Sinhalese Sports Club Ground, Colombo – match drawn

Both Tests in the Sri Lanka v India series were drawn so the series result was 0-0:

- 1st Test @ R Premadasa Stadium, Colombo – match drawn
- 2nd Test @ Sinhalese Sports Club Ground, Colombo – match drawn

== External sources ==
- CricInfo – brief history of Sri Lankan cricket
- CricketArchive – Tournaments in Sri Lanka
