= List of international cricket grounds in Sri Lanka =

Locations of grounds that have hosted an international match in Sri Lanka

Cricket is a popular sport in Sri Lanka. The country has ten grounds that have been used to host international cricket matches, and seven of them have hosted Test matches. However, the Colombo Cricket Club Ground, Asgiriya Stadium and the Tyronne Fernando Stadium are no longer used for matches at international level, although they are still used for domestic matches and warm-up matches for visiting teams. The Galle International Stadium was destroyed in the 2004 Indian Ocean tsunami, but was rebuilt and hosted international matches again in 2007. The Rangiri Dambulla International Stadium held its maiden One Day International in 2001, but was unable to host another until 2003 due to a legal problem.

The Hambantota and Pallekele cricket grounds were both newly constructed for 2011 Cricket World Cup, which Sri Lanka jointly hosted with India and Bangladesh. The R. Premadasa Stadium has also hosted world cup matches. The R. Premadasa Stadium was also one of the three grounds in Sri Lanka that hosted matches for the 1996 Cricket World Cup. The other two were the Asgiriya Stadium and the Sinhalese Sports Club Ground.

The R. Premadasa Stadium was the venue for the match in 1997 where Sri Lanka scored a record 952 runs for 6 wickets against India. Sri Lankan cricketer Mahela Jayawardene has scored a total of 2467 Test runs at the Sinhalese Sports Club Ground, the most runs scored by a batsman in one ground. It is also the venue where he scored 374 runs, the highest score by a Sri Lankan batsman. The venue where the most Test wickets have been taken by a single bowler is also the Sinhalese Sports Club Ground, where 166 have been taken by Muttiah Muralitharan. The Asgiriya Stadium ranks second with 117 wickets, and is followed by the Galle International Stadium with 103 wickets. Both these records are also held by Muralitharan. Sanath Jayasuriya has scored 2514 ODI runs at the R. Premadasa Stadium, making it the venue which has the highest ODI runs by a single batsman. The largest non-cricket stadium in Sri Lanka is the 25,000-capacity Sugathadasa Stadium, which is used mostly for association football matches.

== List of grounds ==
=== Key ===
Key
Legend		Meaning
Name		Official name
Capacity		Seating capacity of the stadium (approximately)
Test	First	Starting date of the first Test match played
Test	Last	Starting date of the last Test match played
ODI	First	Date of the first One Day International played
ODI	Last	Date of the last One Day International played
T20I	First	Date of the first Twenty20 International played
T20I	Last	Date of the last Twenty20 International played
Ref.		Reference(s)

=== Active stadiums ===
Name	Image	Location	Capacity	Test		ODI		T20I		Ref.
Name	Image	Location	Capacity	First	Last	First	Last	First	Last	Ref.
Galle International Stadium		Galle, Southern Province	35,000	(New Zealand) v (Sri Lanka); 3 June 1998	(India) v (Sri Lanka); 15 August 2025	(Australia) v (Sri Lanka); 22 August 1999	(Zimbabwe) v (Sri Lanka); 2 July 2017	—N/a	—N/a	
Mahinda Rajapaksa International Cricket Stadium		Sooriyawewa, Southern Province	35,000	—N/a	—N/a	(Sri Lanka) v (Canada); 20 February 2011	(Afghanistan) v (Pakistan); 4 August 2023	(Sri Lanka) v (Pakistan); 1 June 2012	(South Africa) v (Sri Lanka); 6 August 2013	
Pallekele International Cricket Stadium		Pallekele, Central Province	35,000	(Cricket West Indies) v (Sri Lanka); 1 December 2010	(Sri Lanka) v (Bangladesh); 29 April 2021	(New Zealand) v (Pakistan); 8 March 2011	(Sri Lanka) v (Bangladesh); 8 July 2025	(Sri Lanka) v (Australia); 6 August 2011	(Pakistan) v (Sri Lanka); 28 February 2026	
R. Premadasa Stadium		Colombo, Western Province	35,000	(Australia) v (Sri Lanka); 28 August 1992	(Zimbabwe) v (Sri Lanka); 14 July 2017	(Sri Lanka) v (New Zealand); 5 April 1986	(England) v (Sri Lanka); 27 January 2026	(Sri Lanka) v (India); 10 February 2009	(New Zealand) v (England); 27 February 2026	
Rangiri Dambulla International Stadium		Dambulla, Central Province	16,800	—N/a	—N/a	(England) v (Sri Lanka); 23 March 2001	(Sri Lanka) v (New Zealand); 13 November 2024	(Sri Lanka) v (Afghanistan); 17 February 2024	(Pakistan) v (Sri Lanka); 11 January 2026	
Sinhalese Sports Club Cricket Ground		Colombo, Western Province	10,000	(Sri Lanka) v (England); 13 March 1984	(Sri Lanka) v (Bangladesh); 25 June 2025	(England) v (Sri Lanka); 13 February 1982	(Cricket West Indies) v (Sri Lanka); 22 February 2020	(Canada) v (Ireland); 3 February 2010	(Pakistan) v (Namibia); 18 February 2026	

=== Former stadiums ===
Name	Image	Location	Capacity	Test		ODI		T20I		Ref.
Name	Image	Location	Capacity	First	Last	First	Last	First	Last	Ref.
Asgiriya Stadium		Kandy, Central Province	10,300	(Sri Lanka) v (Australia); 22 April 1983	(Sri Lanka) v (England); 1 December 2007	(Sri Lanka) v (Pakistan); 2 March 1986	(Zimbabwe) v (Cricket West Indies); 16 December 2001	—N/a	—N/a	
Colombo Cricket Club Ground (CCC)		Colombo, Western Province	6,000	(Sri Lanka) v (New Zealand); 24 March 1984	(Sri Lanka) v (New Zealand); 16 April 1987	—N/a	—N/a	—N/a	—N/a	
De Soysa Stadium		Moratuwa, Western Province	16,000	(Australia) v (Sri Lanka); 8 September 1992	(Sri Lanka) v (Cricket West Indies); 8 December 1993	(Sri Lanka) v (New Zealand); 31 March 1984	(Sri Lanka) v (New Zealand); 14 August 1993	—N/a	—N/a	
Paikiasothy Saravanamuttu Stadium		Colombo, Western Province	15,000	(Sri Lanka) v (England); 17 February 1982	(Sri Lanka) v (New Zealand); 22 August 2019	(Australia) v (Sri Lanka); 13 April 1983	(Sri Lanka) v (Bangladesh); 20 July 2007	(Afghanistan) v (Ireland); 1 February 2010	(Nepal) v (Hong Kong); 24 November 2014	

== See also ==
- List of Sri Lanka national cricket captains
- Lists of stadiums
