= Mohammad Aslam =

Mohammad Aslam may refer to:

== Cricket ==
- Mohammad Aslam (Balochistan cricketer) (born 1987), Pakistani cricketer
- Mohammad Aslam (Emirati cricketer) (born 1961)
- Mohammad Aslam (Omani cricketer) (born 1975), Pakistan-born cricketer for Oman
- Mohammad Aslam (Peshawar cricketer) (born 1979), Pakistani cricketer
- Mohammad Aslam (Punjab cricketer) (born 1975), Pakistani cricketer
- Mohammad Aslam Khokhar (1920–2011), Pakistani cricketer
- Mohammed Aslam (Kuwaiti cricketer) (born 1990), Sri Lankan cricketer
- Mohammad Aslam (umpire) (born 1949), Pakistani cricket umpire
- Mohamed Aslam (cricketer) (born 1980), Sri Lankan cricketer

== Others ==
- Mohammad Aslam (politician) (born 1965), Indian politician
- Mohammad Aslam Bhutani (born 1960), Pakistani politician
- Mohammed Aslam, Indian playback singer and lyricist
- Sheikh Mohammad Aslam (born 1962), Bangladeshi footballer
- Mohammad Aslam, the father of a son who called Aimee Betro as a part of a failed murder plot.

== See also ==
- Mohamed Aslam (disambiguation)
- Muhammad Aslam (disambiguation)
