= Chamikara =

Chamikara is a given name. Notable people with the name include:

- Chamikara Edirisinghe (born 1991), Sri Lankan cricketer
- Chamikara Mudalige (born 1976), Sri Lankan cricketer
