= Anthonisz =

Anthonisz is a surname. Notable people with the surname include:

- Adriaan Anthonisz (1527–1607), Dutch mathematician, surveyor, cartographer, and military engineer
- Cornelis Anthonisz (ca. 1505–1553), Dutch painter, engraver, and mapmaker
- Peter Daniel Anthonisz (1822–1903), Sri Lankan physician
- R. G. Anthonisz (1852–1930), Ceylonese lawyer, educationist, and civil servant
- Stefan Anthonisz (born 1963), Sri Lankan cricketer
- Vernon Anthonisz, Singaporean radio presenter
