= Kamilas Perera =

Sri Lankan cricketer

Kamilas Perera is a Sri Lankan former cricketer. He was a wicket-keeper who played for Moratuwa Sports Club.

Perera made a single first-class appearance for the side, during the 1995–96 season, against Colts Cricket Club. From the upper-middle order, he scored 33 runs in the first innings in which he batted, and 14 runs in the second.
