= 1990–91 Sri Lankan cricket season =

The 1990–91 Sri Lankan cricket season was dominated by Sinhalese Sports Club who won both the country's major trophies.

== Honours ==
- Lakspray Trophy – Sinhalese Sports Club
- Hatna Trophy – Sinhalese Sports Club
- Most runs – UNK Fernando 656 @ 65.60 (HS 160)
- Most wickets – FS Ahangama 39 @ 14.89 (BB 5-44)

== Test series ==
Sri Lanka played no home Test matches this season.

== External sources ==
- CricInfo – brief history of Sri Lankan cricket
- CricketArchive – Tournaments in Sri Lanka
