= Nomads SC =

Nomads SC may refer to:

- Manila Nomads Sports Club, sports club in the Philippines
- Nomads Soccer Club, soccer club in the United States
- Nomads Sports Club, defunct cricket team in Sri Lanka
