= Mohamed Aslam =

Mohamed Aslam may refer to:

- Mahammadu Aslam, Member of parliament, Sri Lanka
- Mohamed Aslam (cricketer) (born 1980), Sri Lankan cricketer
- Mohamed Aslam (housing minister), former Maldivian minister of housing
- Mohamed Aslam (member of parliament), former member of the Maldives parliament

== See also ==
- Mohammad Aslam (disambiguation)
- Muhammad Aslam (disambiguation)
