= Sahabandu =

Sahabandu is a surname. Notable people with the surname include:

- Daya Sahabandu (1940–2023), Sri Lankan cricketer
- Kosala Sahabandu (born 1949), Sri Lankan athlete
