= Mudalige =

Mudalige is a surname. Notable people with the surname include:

- Chamikara Mudalige (born 1976), Sri Lankan cricketer
- Lahiru Mudalige (born 1983), Sri Lankan television journalist
