= Geeth Alwis =

Sri Lankan cricketer (born 1987)

Geeth Alwis (full name Waduthantrige Geeth Rasanga Kumarasiri Alwis; born 21 December 1987) is a former Sri Lankan cricketer. He was born in Colombo. He has played for the Saracens Sports Club, the Ruhuna cricket team, the Sinhalese Sports Club and the Chilaw Marians Cricket Club teams in the domestic game and internationally he did not play. He was an all-rounder in 60 matches from the 2007–08 season to 2013–14. He scored 4,244 runs, completing 6 centuries and his highest score of 219. He took 147 wickets and his best bowling was 6–36. He bowled slow left-arm orthodox spin and was a left-handed batsman.

Alwis made his first-class debut in November 2007 when he played for the Saracens in the 2007–08 Premier Limited Overs Tournament against the Sri Lanka Air Force Sports Club. His last match was in the 2013–14 Premier Trophy for the Marians, also against the Air Force.
