= 1989–90 Sri Lankan cricket season =

The 1989–90 Sri Lankan cricket season was dominated by Sinhalese Sports Club who won both the country's major trophies.

== Honours ==
- Lakspray Trophy – Sinhalese Sports Club
- Brown's Trophy – Sinhalese Sports Club
- Most runs – WAA Wasantha 519 @ 57.66 (HS 134)
- Most wickets – KPJ Warnaweera 71 @ 13.47 (BB 7–16)

== Test series ==
Sri Lanka played no home Test matches this season.

== External sources ==
- CricInfo – brief history of Sri Lankan cricket
- CricketArchive – Tournaments in Sri Lanka
