= Sri Lankan cricket team in India in 1975–76 =

International cricket tour

The Sri Lanka cricket team toured India from October to December 1975. Sri Lanka did not then have Test status, but three four-day unofficial Tests were played, India winning 2–0. The tour also included six other first-class matches.

== The Sri Lankan team ==
- Anura Tennekoon (captain)
- David Heyn (vice-captain)
- Dennis Chanmugam
- Amitha de Costa
- Somachandra de Silva
- Ajit de Silva
- Roy Dias
- Ranjit Fernando
- Mahes Goonatilleke
- Russell Hamer
- Lalith Kaluperuma
- Duleep Mendis
- Tony Opatha
- Anura Ranasinghe
- Daya Sahabandu
- Bandula Warnapura
- Sunil Wettimuny

The manager was Neil Perera and the assistant manager was Abu Fuard.
