= Pradeep de Silva (Nomads Sports Club cricketer) =

Sri Lankan cricketer

Pradeep de Silva was a Sri Lankan cricketer who played for Nomads Sports Club.

De Silva made four appearances for the side during the 1988-89 Lakspray Trophy tournament, making his debut against Panadura Sports Club in March 1989. In five innings, he scored a total of 15 runs, including a top score of 8 runs in his second first-class appearance.
