= Amitha de Costa =

Sri Lankan cricketer (1949–2019)

Personal information
- Born: 4th May 1949; Gampaha
- Died: 8 June 2019 (aged 70); Kaduwela
- Batting: Right-handed
- Role: Opening batsman

Career statistics
Competition	First-class
Matches	7
Runs scored	230
Batting average	16.42
100s/50s	0/1
Top score	80
Catches/stumpings	3/–
- Source: Cricinfo

Kesera M Amitha de Costa (1949 – 8 June 2019) was a cricketer who played first-class cricket for Sri Lanka from 1973 to 1975. He was an opening batsman.

Amitha de Costa attended Thurstan College in Colombo, where he was a prominent member of the cricket team from 1967 to 1969. He played his first match of first-class cricket for Sri Lanka against the touring English team in 1972–73, scoring 12 in the first innings, when he took 65 minutes to make his first run.

He toured India with the Sri Lankan team in 1975-76. He scored 80 against West Zone and was included in the side for the second of the three matches against India. He scored 13 and 31 but Sri Lanka lost and he lost his place for the third match.
