= Russell Hamer =

Sri Lankan cricketer (1947–2024)

Personal information
- Full name: Russell Percival Peter Hamer
- Born: June 12, 1947; British Ceylon
- Died: 27 March 2024 (aged 76); Colombo, Sri Lanka
- Batting: Left-handed
- Role: Wicket-keeper

Career statistics
Competition	FC	List A
Matches	15	2
Runs scored	383	5
Batting average	15.95	–
100s/50s	0/1	0/0
Top score	52	4*
Catches/stumpings	22/8	2/1
- Source: Cricket Archive, 31 January 2018

Russell Hamer (12 June 1947 – 27 March 2024) was a Sri Lankan cricketer who played first-class for the Sri Lanka national team from 1968 to 1977.

== Biography ==
Hamer attended Wesley College, Colombo, and played cricket for Ceylon Schools in 1964. He played his first match of first-class cricket in the Gopalan Trophy in 1967–68, and made his highest score of 52 in the Gopalan Trophy match in 1970–71.

Hamer was Sri Lanka's main wicket-keeper in the early 1970s. He toured India with the Sri Lankan team in 1975-76 and played in two of the three matches against India. He also played two limited-overs matches for Sri Lanka against touring MCC teams in the 1970s, both of which Sri Lanka won.

In 2017, Hamer was one of the first players to receive financial assistance under a new scheme to help former national players with medical expenses. He had recently suffered a stroke. In September 2018, he was one of 49 former Sri Lankan cricketers felicitated by Sri Lanka Cricket, to honour them for their services before Sri Lanka became a full member of the International Cricket Council (ICC).

Hamer died on 27 March 2024.
