= Daya Sahabandu =

Sri Lankan cricketer (1940–2023)

Personal information
- Full name: Dayananda Sahabandu
- Born: 28 March 1940; Colombo, British Ceylon
- Died: 9 August 2023 (aged 83); Kotte, Colombo, Sri Lanka
- Nickname: Bandu, Sahab
- Height: 6 ft 1 in (1.85 m)
- Batting: Right-handed
- Bowling: Slow left-arm orthodox, left-arm slow-medium

Career statistics
Competition	First-class
Matches	18
Runs scored	78
Batting average	6.00
100s/50s	0/0
Top score	32 not out
Balls bowled	4824
Wickets	87
Bowling average	19.49
5 wickets in innings	6
10 wickets in match	2
Best bowling	8/37
Catches/stumpings	6/–
- Source: Cricinfo, 21 January 2018

Dayananda Sahabandu (28 March 1940 – 9 August 2023) was a Sri Lankan cricketer who played first-class cricket for the Sri Lankan national team from 1968 to 1975. He was nicknamed as the "King of Viharamahadevi Park" mainly referring to his bowling heroics.

== Cricket career ==
Daya Sahabandu attended Royal College, Colombo, where he played in the First XI from 1957 to 1960. A left-arm spin bowler who could also bowl a little faster and open the bowling, he began playing senior club cricket in Ceylon in the early 1960s, and in 20 seasons, mostly playing for Nomads Sports Club, he took more than 1000 wickets with his left-arm spin at an average of just over 14. He played 253 matches, bowling 6552.1 overs of which 1919 were maidens, and he conceded only 14,787 runs.

Sahabandu was selected to tour England with the Ceylon team in 1968, but the tour was cancelled just before it was due to begin. After the English veteran Test player Tom Graveney was dismissed by Sahabandu in the 1968–69 season, he said Sahabandu was the best left-arm spinner he had ever faced. His bowling prowess and trajectory was described as "lovely loopy off-stump line" to take 5 for 86 in 37 overs against the touring England side. In 1969, against the visiting Australian team he continued to impress with his bowling as he claimed the prized scalps of Keith Stackpole, Ian Chappell, Ian Redpath and Jock Irvine.

Two months later, in a drawn Gopalan Trophy match, Sahabandu opened the bowling for Ceylon and took 5 for 54 and 6 for 83. On Sri Lanka's tour of India in 1975–76 he took 8 for 37 and 4 for 46 against East Zone. He was occasionally a useful defensive tail-end batsman, but was rated as a poor fielder.

He was known for his marathon batting performance against a formidable Indian team composed of spin stalwarts E. A. S. Prasanna, B. S. Chandrasekhar and Bishan Singh Bedi during an unofficial Test match between Ceylon and India in Hyderabad in 1975 where he remained unbeaten on 32 after occupying the crease for four hours and 16 minutes (some sources claim he batted for five and a half hours). He went in to bat as a nightwatchman during Sri Lanka's second innings and his exhibition of stroke-less batting gave the tourists a glimmer of hope. Sri Lanka lost the match, but his batting helped them avoid an innings defeat. He played his last match for Ceylon at Nagpur on the 1975 tour.

Sahabandu later served as a national selector. In September 2018, he was one of 49 former Sri Lankan cricketers felicitated by Sri Lanka Cricket, to honour them for their services before Sri Lanka became a full member of the International Cricket Council (ICC).

== Personal life ==
Sahabandu was employed for 14 years as a physical education instructor by the Colombo Municipal Council and then for 30 years as an executive at the Maharaja Organisation.

Sahabandu and his wife, Swarna, had one son, Janaka. They lived in Wellawatte, a beach-side suburb of Colombo. He died at the Sri Jayawardenepura Hospital in Kotte, on 9 August 2023, at the age of 83. His funeral was held at Jawatte cemetery on 12 August 2023.
