= Anurudda Polonowita =

Sri Lankan cricketer, coach (born 1938)

Anura Polonowita
Personal information
- Full name: Anurudda Polonowita
- Born: 23 July 1938 (age 88); Colombo, Ceylon
- Nickname: Polons
- Batting: Right-handed
- Bowling: Slow left-arm orthodox

Career statistics
Competition	First-class
Matches	20
Runs scored	457
Batting average	19.86
100s/50s	0/2
Top score	53
Balls bowled	2977
Wickets	44
Bowling average	25.90
5 wickets in innings	1
10 wickets in match	0
Best bowling	5/45
Catches/stumpings	19/0
- Source: CricketArchive, 22 February 2017

Anurudda "Anura" Polonowita (born 23 July 1938) is a former cricketer who played for Ceylon from 1960 to 1969. He later became a prominent cricket administrator and groundsman. In September 2018, he was one of 49 former Sri Lankan cricketers felicitated by Sri Lanka Cricket, to honour their services before Sri Lanka became a full member of the International Cricket Council (ICC).

== Early life and playing career ==
Polonowita attended Ananda College, where he played in the first XI for five years. In his final year, 1958, he captained the team and took 80 wickets in nine matches with his left-arm spin.

On his first-class debut, Polonowita took 5 for 45 in the first innings of the Gopalan Trophy match in 1959–60. In the Gopalan Trophy match in 1960-61 he took 4 for 16 in each innings (match figures of 29.4–14–32–8) to help Ceylon to a 169-run victory.

Polonowita played a part in Ceylon's first two important international victories. When Ceylon defeated a Pakistan team in 1964–65 in Colombo he took three wickets in the second innings. Four months later, against India in Ahmedabad, he top-scored in Ceylon's first innings with 53, took three catches, took 3 for 7 in India's second innings, and was at the wicket when Michael Tissera hit the winning runs. He was selected to tour England with the Ceylon team in 1968, but the tour was cancelled just before it was due to begin.

After playing for Sinhalese Sports Club for a few seasons, Polonowita helped to form the Nomads Sports Club in the 1960s and take it shortly afterwards to the premiership in the P Saravanamuttu Trophy.

== Later life ==
When President Ranasinghe Premadasa built the Khettarama Cricket Stadium (later named Premadasa Stadium) in the 1980s he sent Polonowita to Australia on a three-month course to study curatorship to ensure the ground would be properly maintained. From 2000 to 2013, Polonowita was the chief curator for Sri Lanka Cricket. He prepared more than 90 Test pitches. He has also been the chairman of the umpires committee, chairman of the tournament committee, a member of the selection committee, vice-president, national coach, and manager of the Test and Sri Lanka A teams. He also coached the Ananda College cricket team for 38 years.

Polonowita worked for Colombo Municipal Council for 40 years. He oversaw the establishment of 23 pre-schools for less privileged children in Colombo and the training of 45 pre-school teachers to staff the schools. At the time of his retirement he held the position of Director of Sports.

Polonowita and his wife Chitrangini have two daughters and a son.
