= Chaminda Mendis =

Sri Lankan cricketer (born 1968)

Personal information
- Full name: Manimeldura Chaminda Mendis
- Born: 28 December 1968 (age 57); Galle, Sri Lanka
- Batting: Right-handed
- Bowling: Right-arm off break

International information
- National side: Sri Lanka (1995)
- Only ODI (cap 85): 1 April 1995 v New Zealand

Career statistics
Competition	ODI
Matches	1
Runs scored	3
Batting average	–
100s/50s	0/0
Top score	3*
Catches/stumpings	0/–
- Source: Cricinfo, 6 April 2006

Manimeldura Chaminda Mendis (born 28 December 1968) is a former Sri Lankan cricketer who was born in Galle. He played one One Day International for the Sri Lankans in 1994, debuting against New Zealand, which was his only international match. He also played for the Colts Cricket Club, Western Province, Sri Lanka A and Sri Lanka. In November 2018, he was named on Sri Lanka Cricket's National Selection Panel.
