= Buddy Reid =

Sri Lankan cricketer (born 1940)

Personal information
- Full name: Barclay George Reid
- Born: 4 November 1940 (age 86); Ceylon
- Nickname: Buddy
- Batting: Right-handed
- Bowling: Right-arm leg-spin

Career statistics
Competition	First-class
Matches	10
Runs scored	331
Batting average	18.38
100s/50s	0/1
Top score	50 not out
Balls bowled	347
Wickets	7
Bowling average	25.42
5 wickets in innings	0
10 wickets in match	0
Best bowling	4/19
Catches/stumpings	5/0
- Source: Cricket Archive, 17 January 2015

Barclay George "Buddy" Reid (born 4 November 1940) is a former cricketer who played first-class cricket for Ceylon in the 1960s. He is also an international table tennis player and a medical doctor. He migrated to Australia in the 1970s.

== Life in Ceylon ==
Buddy Reid attended St. Thomas' College, Mount Lavinia, and the University of Colombo, where he studied medicine. He made his first-class debut for the Ceylon Board President's XI in a Gopalan Trophy match against Madras in March 1964, batting at number three and scoring 46 (the innings top score) and 22 in a six-wicket victory.

He played in most of Ceylon's matches for the next six years, usually opening the batting and occasionally bowling leg-breaks. He was selected to tour England with the Ceylon team in 1968, but the tour was cancelled just before it was due to begin.

He captained Ceylon against MCC in 1968–69, making his highest score, 50 not out, in the second innings. The previous season he had taken his best bowling figures, 4 for 19, for Ceylon Transport Board in the Moin-ud-Dowlah Gold Cup Tournament.

== Life in Australia ==
Reid and his wife Peace and their daughter and son moved to Australia in the 1970s, where he continued to practise medicine.

Reid also represented Ceylon and Australia at table tennis. He was Ceylon's national men's singles champion in 1959, 1960 and 1962, and doubles champion six times. In 2016 he became the World Over-75 Table Tennis Champion, winning the singles title in Alicante, Spain. He added the World Over-75 doubles title in Las Vegas in 2018, when he teamed with Australian team-mate Igor Klaf.

In September 2018, Reid was one of 49 former Sri Lankan cricketers felicitated by Sri Lanka Cricket, to honour them for their services before Sri Lanka became a full member of the International Cricket Council (ICC).

For many years Reid was a tutor of medical students in the Monash University Faculty of Medicine, Nursing and Health Sciences.
