= Muhammad Aslam =

Muhammad Aslam may refer to:

- Muhammad Aslam (field hockey) (born 1910), Indian field hockey player
- Muhammad Haroon Aslam (fl. 1975–2013), Pakistani Army general
- Muhammad Havlidar Aslam (born 1921), Pakistani Olympic runner
- Muhammad Aslam (judge) (1947–2020), PakistanI jurist and lawyer
- Khwaja Muhammad Aslam (1922–2019), Pakistani sprinter

== See also ==
- Mohamed Aslam (disambiguation)
- Mohammad Aslam (disambiguation)
