= Priyankara Wickramasinghe =

Sri Lankan cricketer

Personal information
- Full name: Prasad Priyankara Wickramasinghe
- Born: 12 May 1977 (age 49); Colombo, Sri Lanka
- Batting: Left-handed
- Bowling: Legbreak

Domestic team information
- Years: Team
- Bloomfield Cricket and Athletic Club
- Chilaw Marians Cricket Club

Career statistics
| Competition | FC | List A |
|---|---|---|
| Matches | 65 | 41 |
| Runs scored | 1,368 | 139 |
| Batting average | 25.33 | 6.95 |
| 100s/50s | 1/1 | 0/0 |
| Top score | 121* | 20 |
| Balls bowled | 8,105 | 1495 |
| Wickets | 189 | 37 |
| Bowling average | 18.59 | 28.62 |
| 5 wickets in innings | 10 | 0 |
| 10 wickets in match | 1 | 0 |
| Best bowling | 8/47 | 4/48 |
| Catches/stumpings | 45/0 | 10/0 |
- Source: CricInfo, 21 August 2022

Prasad Priyankara Wickramasinghe (born 12 May 1977) is a Sri Lankan-born cricketer who played for the Malaysia national cricket team, Bloomfield Cricket and Athletic Club, Sri Lankan A team and the Sri Lankan Board XI.

== Personal and early life ==
Priyankara was educated at Nalanda College, Colombo and played cricket for Nalanda College first XI team from 1994 to 1995 & former Sri Lanka cricket captain Mahela Jayawardene was his teammate.

Malaysian international career

Priyankara made his debut for Malaysia in 2008 against Singapore.
