= Anil Rideegammanagedera =

Sri Lankan cricketer (born 1976)

Personal information
- Full name: Anil Lincoln Rideegammanagedera
- Born: 23 June 1976 (age 50)
- Source: Cricinfo, 19 April 2021

Anil Rideegammanagedera, born on June 23, 1976, is a retired Sri Lankan cricketer. He played in 163 first-class and 99 List A matches between 1995/96 and 2016/17, scoring more than 6,500 first-class runs and taking 300 wickets.
