= Upul Sumathipala =

Sri Lankan cricketer (born 1959)

Personal information
- Born: 2 March 1959 (age 67); Galle, Sri Lanka
- Batting: Right-handed
- Source: Cricinfo, 18 February 2016

Upul Sumathipala (born 2 March 1959) is a Sri Lankan former first-class cricketer who played for Galle Cricket Club.
