= Bungle in the jungle =

Poor English cricket performance in 2003

The Bungle in the jungle is an epithet, given to a cricket match played on 18 November 2003. It was an "unmitigated disaster" for England.

Played at the Dambulla stadium, in the Sri Lankan jungle, this One Day International is notable for the dismissal of the England cricket team for just 88 runs. In the 477 One day internationals played by England, this aggregate was only two runs more than their worst display. Sri Lanka achieved the 89 runs required to win in just 13.5 of their permitted 50 overs, for the loss of no wickets and a "comprehensive victory". In Wisden's words, England were "battered". The disastrous England score was attributed to "a flurry of misjudgments, over-ambition, and world-class fielding".

== See also ==
- English cricket team in Sri Lanka in 2003-04
- "The Rumble in the Jungle", a boxing match between Muhammad Ali and George Foreman in what was then called Zaire.
