= Lyndon Loos =

Sri Lankan cricketer (born 1966)

Personal information
- Born: 31 July 1966 (age 60)
- Batting: Right-handed
- Role: Wicketkeeper
- Source: Cricinfo, 18 February 2016

Lyndon Loos (born 31 July 1966) is a Sri Lankan former first-class cricketer who played for Galle Cricket Club.
