= Thusara Sampath =

Sri Lankan cricketer (born 1974)

Personal information
- Full name: Manage Thusara Sampath
- Born: 19 November 1974 (age 51)
- Source: Cricinfo, 19 April 2021

Thusara Sampath (born 19 November 1974) is a Sri Lankan former cricketer. He played in 49 first-class matches between 1990/91 and 1999/00. After his playing career he became a television news presenter.
