= Rasika Priyadarshana =

Sri Lankan cricketer (born 1975)

Personal information
- Full name: Batepola Arachchige Rasika Suranga Priyadarshana
- Born: 23 November 1975 (age 50)
- Source: Cricinfo, 19 April 2021

Rasika Priyadarshana (born 23 November 1975) is a Sri Lankan former cricketer. He studied at St. Thomas' College, Matara. He played in 137 first-class and 57 List A matches between 1993/94 and 2011/12. In January 2003, Priyadarshana was summoned by a disciplinary committee due to a code of conduct breach, for which he was handed a two-match ban, suspended for one year.
