= Chamikara Mudalige =

Sri Lankan cricketer (born 1976)

Personal information
- Full name: Chamikara Ravinda Bentota Mudalige
- Born: 5 July 1976 (age 50)
- Source: Cricinfo, 19 April 2021

Chamikara Mudalige (born 5 July 1976) is a Sri Lankan former cricketer. He played in 124 first-class and 62 List A matches between 1995/96 and 2011/12. He made his Twenty20 debut on 17 August 2004, for Nondescripts Cricket Club in the 2004 SLC Twenty20 Tournament.
