= Moratuwa Sports Club =

Sri Lankan cricket team

Moratuwa Sports Club is a first-class cricket team in Sri Lanka. As of 2026, Moratuwa SC competes in Tier "B" 3 Day League. Previously, it had competed in the Premier Trophy, Sri Lanka's main first-class cricket competition, for 13 seasons following the international recognition of first-class status for the 1988–89 season. However, its first-class status was not continuous. In addition, it competed in the Premier Limited Overs Tournament, Sri Lanka's main List A cricket competition, for five seasons.

== Status in different cricket seasons ==
Moratuwa's matches in the Premier Trophy are considered by international cricket authorities as having been of first-class status in the seasons 1988–1991, 1992–1996, 2001–2004 and 2007–2010. Its games in the Premier Limited Overs Tournament are similarly considered to be of List A status in the seasons 1993–94, 2002–03 and 2007–2010.

It is currently part of Tier B of Sri Lanka Cricket domestic league.

== Notable players ==
- Kamilas Perera

== See also ==
- List of Sri Lankan cricket teams
