= Nomads Sports Club =

Sri Lankan former cricket team

Nomads Sports Club is a former first-class cricket team in Sri Lanka.

Nomads are one of the oldest Sri Lankan cricket teams. They won the P Sara Trophy in 1964-65 and 1967–68, when the competition was yet to acquire first-class status. They competed in the first-class competition in 1988-89 and 1994–95. Of their 12 matches they won one, lost five and drew six. They played their home matches at Viharamahadevi Park, Colombo.

They continue to compete at sub-first-class levels.

== Notable players ==
- Jayantha Amerasinghe
- Pradeep de Silva
- Somachandra de Silva
- Lionel Fernando
- Stanley Jayasinghe
- A. C. M. Lafir
- Anurudda Polonowita

== See also ==
- List of Sri Lankan cricket teams
