= De Soysa Stadium =

Sports stadium in Moratuwa, Sri Lanka

De Soysa International Cricket Stadium
- Moratuwa Stadium, Tyronne Fernando Stadium
- Interactive map of De Soysa International Cricket Stadium

Ground information
- Location: Moratuwa, Western Province
- Country: Sri Lanka
- Coordinates: 6.7948°N 79.8887°E
- Establishment: 1952
- Capacity: 16,000
- Owner: Moratuwa Sports Club
- Operator: Sri Lanka Cricket
- End names
- Press Box End; Katubadda End

International information
- First Test: 8–13 September 1992: Sri Lanka v Australia
- Last Test: 8–13 December 1993: Sri Lanka v West Indies
- First ODI: 31 March 1984: Sri Lanka v New Zealand
- Last ODI: 14 August 1993: Sri Lanka v India
- First WODI: 25 March 1999: Sri Lanka v Netherlands
- Last WODI: 30 January 2002: Sri Lanka v Pakistan

Team information
Moratuwa Cricket Club	(1952 – present)
- As of 2 September 2020; Source: Cricinfo

De Soysa Cricket Stadium (formerly known as Tyronne Fernando Stadium) is a multi-use stadium in Moratuwa, in southwestern Sri Lanka. It is currently used mostly for cricket matches. The stadium holds 15,000 people and hosted its first Test match in 1992. The ground opened in 1940 and gained Test status in 1979. Moratuwa, located just thirteen kilometres (8 mi) south of Colombo, is renowned for its carpentry, cricket and its philanthropists. Indeed, it was the most famous of these families that initiated the development of De Soysa Park Stadium, when they donated the 20,000 m^{2} (5 acres) plot of land to the Urban Council in 1940, to develop the Sports Complex. An additional 0.81 ha (2 acres) were sold below its market value by another member of the family. The ground was named De Soysa Park and subsequently used mainly for Moratuwa Sports Club (MSC) and school competitions.

== History ==
=== A. H. T. de Soysa ===
Albert Hildebrand Theodore de Soysa (14 March 1889 - 2 November 1959) was a Ceylonese entrepreneur and philanthropist. He was the second son of Solomon Peter de Soysa (1854–1906), the Managing Director of the business concerns of cousin Sir Charles Henry de Soysa and Dora Caroline Weerasooriya. He attended Trinity College, Kandy and went on to become its greatest benefactor by financing several building projects including the college hall.

In 1940, de Soysa initiated the development of the De Soysa Park as a venue for sports and recreation by gifting a 2.0 ha (5 acres) plot of land and purchasing an additional 0.81 ha (2 acres). It was intended for cricket, other sports and public use. It was again de Soysa that assisted the call for putting up the first stadium/pavilion in 1952. His other benefactions include the Ingiriya Hospital , the Gamini Central College and the Christ Church, Ingiriya (Kalutara District). He was a recipient of the Distinguished Auxiliary Service Medal of The Salvation Army.

=== Club Presidents and other benefactors ===
The club, its presidents D. H. L. De Silva, Dr. H. I. Fernando and local MP Wimalasiri De Mel took a keen interest in developing it further. In 1979 Moratuwa received public funds from the then Deputy Foreign Minister, Tyronne Fernando. A stadium was built, which could accommodate approximately 16,000 spectators.

=== International matches ===
The first international team to play at the ground was the West Indians in 1979. The pitch has traditionally favoured the batsmen, but it can break up and the ball then has a tendency to keep low. The first Test match at the ground was against Australia on 8 September 1992. Allan Border made 106 and Ian Healy 71 as the visitors scored 337 in the first innings and controlled the match thereafter. However, half centuries from Aravinda De Silva and Hashan Tillakaratne ensured a draw for the home side.

The most memorable of the four Test matches - they were all drawn - at the ground was the third, against South Africa. On the last day Jonty Rhodes defied Muttiah Muralitharan to score 101* and keep the series alive. Bangladesh played their first ever ODI match here against Pakistan in the 1986 Asia Cup.

In recent times the venue is mostly used for the foreign teams to play their side games and for Sebastianites to play their home matches in the domestic season. In recent times the wicket has become rather low in bounce, is conducive to spin, but is generally favourable to the batsmen. It is also the venue for the Battle of the Golds, the annual big-match between Prince of Wales' College and St. Sebastian's College. The Battle of the Golds (Panadura and Moratuwa) between Moratu Maha Vidyalaya and Sri Sumangala College, Panadura. The Battle of the Mangosteen, between Kalutara Vidyalaya and Tissa Central College and the Battle of Greens, between Royal College, Panadura and St John's College, Panadura and Battle of the Raigam Salpiti Taxila Central College Horana vs Piliyandala Central College are played at the venue.

== International five-wicket hauls ==
=== Key ===
Symbol	Meaning
†	The bowler was man of the match
‡	10 or more wickets taken in the match
§	One of two five-wicket hauls by the bowler in the match
Date	Day the Test started or ODI was held
Inn	Innings in which five-wicket haul was taken
Overs	Number of overs bowled. ^{8} indicates that eight balls were bowled in each over.
Runs	Number of runs conceded
Wkts	Number of wickets taken
Econ	Runs conceded per over
Batsmen	Batsmen whose wickets were taken
Result	Result of the match

=== Tests ===
Five-wicket hauls in Test matches at Tyronne Fernando Stadium
No.	Bowler	Date	Team	Opposing team	Inn	Overs	Runs	Wkts	Econ	Batsmen	Result
1	Champaka Ramanayake	8 September 1992	Sri Lanka	Australia	1	31	82	5	2.64	Tom Moody; David Boon; Mark Waugh; Allan Border; Shane Warne	Drawn
2	Allan Donald	25 August 1993	South Africa	Sri Lanka	1	28	69	5	2.46	Chandika Hathurusingha; Asanka Gurusinha; Arjuna Ranatunga; Piyal Wijetunge; Pramodya Wickramasinghe	Drawn
3	Muttiah Muralitharan	25 August 1993	Sri Lanka	South Africa	2	39	104	5	2.66	Kepler Wessels; Hansie Cronje; Jonty Rhodes; Clive Eksteen; Pat Symcox	Drawn

=== ODIs ===
Five-wicket hauls in ODI matches at Tyronne Fernando Stadium
No.	Bowler	Date	Team	Opposing team	Inn	Overs	Runs	Wkts	Econ	Batsmen	Result
1	Shaul Karnain	31 March 1984	Sri Lanka	New Zealand	2	8	26	5	3.25	Geoff Howarth; Bruce Edgar; Lance Cairns; Jeff Crowe; Martin Crowe	Sri Lanka won
2	Sanath Jayasuriya	20 March 1993	Sri Lanka	England	1	9.5	29	6	2.94	Robin Smith; Neil Fairbrother; John Emburey; Dermot Reeve; Paul Jarvis; Paul Taylor	Sri Lanka won

== International Centuries ==
There has been five Test centuries scored at the venue.

No.	Score	Player	Team	Balls	Opposing team	Date	Result
1	153	Roshan Mahanama	Sri Lanka	297	New Zealand	27 November 1992	Drawn
2	131	Arjuna Ranatunga	Sri Lanka	140	South Africa	25 August 1993	Drawn
3	106	Allan Border	Australia	169	Sri Lanka	8 September 1992	Drawn
4	105	Ken Rutherford	New Zealand	107	Sri Lanka	27 November 1992	Drawn
5	101*	Jonty Rhodes	South Africa	107	Sri Lanka	25 August 1993	Drawn

== See also ==
- List of Test cricket grounds
- List of international cricket grounds in Sri Lanka
