= Nondescripts Cricket Club =

- Nondescripts Cricket Club crest

Personnel
- Captain: (Sri Lanka) Lahiru Udara
- Coach: (Sri Lanka) Sajith Fernando

Team information
- City: Colombo
- Colours: Blue
- Founded: March 19, 1888; 138 years ago
- Home ground: Nondescripts Cricket Club Ground
- Capacity: 2,000

History
- Premier Trophy wins: 16
- Premier Limited Overs Tournament wins: 6
- Twenty20 Tournament wins: 0
- Major Clubs Limited Over Tournament wins: 1

Nondescripts Cricket Club (also known by its initials NCC) is a first-class cricket team based in Colombo, Sri Lanka. The team plays at the Nondescripts Cricket Club Ground.

== History ==
The club was founded in 1888. The name "Nondescripts" is derived from the fact it was intended to be open to anyone, unlike other Colombo-based clubs at the time such as Sinhalese Sports Club, Moors Sports Club and Tamil Union Cricket & Athletic Club which were aligned with one particular ethnic group or another.

== Honours ==
- P Saravanamuttu Trophy/Robert Senanayake Trophy/Lakspray Trophy/Premier Trophy (16)

1952–53, 1953–54, 1954–55, 1956–57, 1957–58, 1960–61, 1969–70, 1970–71, 1975–76, 1976–77, 1978–79, 1985–86, 1988–89, 1993–94, 2000–01, 2013–14

- Under 23 Trophy (2)

2008–09 2009–10

- Major Clubs Limited Over Tournament (1)

2020–21

== Current squad ==
Players with international caps are listed in bold. (Updated as of 24 July 2022)

Name	Age	Batting style	Bowling style	Notes
Batsmen
**Upul Tharanga**	41	Left-handed		Vice-captain
Ahan Wickramasinghe	24	Right-handed		
Kaveen Bandara	28	Left-handed	Right-arm medium-fast	
**Sandun Weerakkody**	32	Left-handed		
**Pathum Nissanka**	27	Right-handed		
**Kamil Mishara**	24	Left-handed	Right-arm off break	
All-rounders
Sahan Arachchige	29	Left-handed	Right-arm off break	
**Chamika Karunaratne**	29	Right-handed	Right-arm medium-fast	
Asel Sigera	26	Right-handed	Slow left-arm orthodox	
Amshi de Silva	24	Right-handed	Right-arm medium	
Johanne de Zilva	25	Right-handed	Right-arm medium-fast	
Wicket-keeper
Lahiru Udara	32	Right-handed		Captain
**Niroshan Dickwella**	32	Left-handed		
Spin Bowlers
Sachindu Colombage	28	Right-handed	Right-arm leg break	
Ashian Daniel	25	Right-handed	Right-arm off break	
**Lasith Embuldeniya**	29	Left-handed	Slow left-arm orthodox	
Yugeesha Dishan	26	Left-handed	Slow left-arm orthodox	
Wanuja Sahan	22	Right-handed	Slow left-arm orthodox	
Pace Bowlers
**Lahiru Kumara**	29	Left-handed	Right-arm fast	
**Chamika Gunasekara**	26	Right-handed	Right-arm medium-fast	
**Dushmantha Chameera**	34	Right-handed	Right-arm fast	
Sampath Nishshanka	23	Left-handed	Left-arm medium	

== Team records ==
- Highest team total – 538 vs Sinhalese Sports Club
- Best innings bowling figures – Lyndon Hannibal 8/38 vs MSC
- Hundred in first match – Prasad Padmasanka 106 vs PSC
- Hundred in each innings – Pradeep Hewage 168 & 123 vs Matara
- Highest individual score – Aravinda De Silva 222 vs SCC
- Partnership records –
- 1 – 233 RP Arnold & S Weerasinghe
- 2 – 226 RP Arnold & MN Nawaz
- 3 – 143 MN Nawaz & PA de Silva
- 4 – 285 HP Tillakaratne & CP Mapatuna
- 5 – 234* RP Arnold & CP Mapatuna
- 6 – 239* DA Gunawardene & HP Tillakaratne
- 7 – 153 PA de Silva & AGD Wickremasinghe
- 8 – 147* RS Kalpage & MTT Mirando
- 9 – 130 HP Tillakaratne & KR Pushpakumara
- 10 – 62 RS Kalpage & WS Sirimanne

== Other Nondescripts clubs ==
The name 'Nondescripts Cricket Club' derives from a 19th-century London-based team. The Nondescripts were a 'wandering' cricket club with no fixed ground and a team composed of players of all standards. A New Zealand Nondescripts Club was established in 1962 to promote "the principles of the game of Cricket, especially sportsmanship and high standards in dress, attitude and application." It too is a 'wandering' club drawn mainly from Wellington and Lower Hutt players; eight NZ internationals have played for the club, including Ewen Chatfield, John Reid and Bob Blair. In the 1980s, a Nondescripts Cricket Club played in the Brunei cricket league. Consisting largely of Sri Lankan expatriates, both Sinhalese and Tamil, it later merged with another club and changed its name.

== Notable players ==
Players who have represented Ceylon in cricket

Players to have represented Sri Lanka at Test cricket

- Rumesh Ratnayake
- Russel Arnold
- Upul Chandana
- Dinesh Chandimal
- Aravinda de Silva
- Niroshan Dickwella
- Avishka Gunawardene
- Ranjan Madugalle
- Lasith Malinga
- Naveed Nawaz
- Ravindra Pushpakumara
- Kumar Sangakkara
- Upul Tharanga
- Hashan Tillakaratne
- Gamini Wickremasinghe
- Farveez Maharoof
