= Paikiasothy Saravanamuttu Stadium =

Cricket stadium in Sri Lanka

Pakiasothy Saravanamuttu Stadium පාකියසොති සර්වනමූත්තු ක්‍රීඩාංගනය பாக்கியசோதி சரவணமுத்து மைதானம்
- P. Sara Oval, Colombo Oval
- Interactive map of Pakiasothy Saravanamuttu Stadium පාකියසොති සර්වනමූත්තු ක්‍රීඩාංගනය பாக்கியசோதி சரவணமுத்து மைதானம்

Ground information
- Location: Borella, Colombo
- Country: Sri Lanka
- Coordinates: 6°55′08″N 79°53′02″E
- Establishment: 1945; 81 years ago
- Capacity: 15,000
- Owner: Tamil Union Cricket and Athletic Club
- Operator: Sri Lanka Cricket
- Tenants: Sri Lanka Cricket
- End names
- Janashakthi Complex End; Scoreboard End

International information
- First men's Test: 17–21 February 1982: Sri Lanka v England
- Last men's Test: 22–26 August 2019: Sri Lanka v New Zealand
- First men's ODI: 13 April 1983: Sri Lanka v Australia
- Last men's ODI: 20 July 2007: Sri Lanka v Bangladesh
- First men's T20I: 1 February 2010: Afghanistan v Ireland
- Last men's T20I: 24 November 2014: Hong Kong v Nepal
- First women's ODI: 20 January 2002: Sri Lanka v Pakistan
- Last women's ODI: 29 April 2023: Sri Lanka v Bangladesh
- First women's T20I: 24 March 2019: Sri Lanka v England
- Last women's T20I: 12 July 2023: Sri Lanka v New Zealand

Team information
| Tamil Union CAC | (1945–present) |
| Sri Lanka | (1982–present) |
- As of 12 May 2023; Source: Cricinfo; CricketArchive

Pakiasothy Saravanamuttu Stadium (Tamil: பாக்கியசோதி சரவணமுத்து மைதானம், Sinhala: පාකියසොති සර්වනමූත්තු ක්‍රීඩාංගනය), also known as Colombo Oval or P. Sara Oval, or simply PSS is a multi-purpose stadium in Colombo, Sri Lanka. It is currently used mostly for cricket matches. The stadium holds 15,000 and hosted its first Test match in 1982. It is named after Paikiasothy Saravanamuttu, a former civil servant and first President of the Board of Control for Cricket. The venue is the home ground of the Tamil Union Cricket and Athletic Club. The P.Sara Oval hosts one Test match per year in Sri Lanka's summer Test calendar, but lost out to Pallekele International Cricket Stadium in 2011 to host Sri Lanka v Australia Tests.

== History ==
The stadium hosted Sri Lanka's first Test, against England in 1982. In 1985, Sri Lanka won their first Test match at this ground, against India.

The ground regularly hosted international matches until 1994, but that was followed by an eight-year lull. In 2002, the ground was used as neutral soil for an Australia vs Pakistan Test Series. The stadium has hosted 15 Test matches, 12 ODIs and one T20I.

It is a relatively small ground, half surrounded by lower-level stands and half by grass banks. The most famous feature is the ivy-covered scoreboard.

== Ground figures ==
=== Key ===
- P Matches Played
- H Matches Won by Home Side
- T Matches Won by Touring Side
- N Matches Won by Neutral Side
- D/N/T Matches Drawn/No Result/Tied

Ground Figures
| Format | P | H | T | N | D/N/T | Inaugural Match |
| Test matches | 22 | 9 | 8 | 1 | 4 | 17 February 1982 |
| One-Day Internationals | 12 | 8 | 2 | 0 | 2 | 13 April 1983 |
| Twenty20 Internationals | 2 | 2 | 0 | 2 | 0 | 1 February 2010 |

Updated 27 August 2019

=== Records ===
- Stephen Fleming (274 not out) holds the record for highest Test score at this ground.
- Best bowling figures by Shane Warne,7/94 Australia vs Pakistan in 2002.

== See also ==
- List of Test cricket grounds
- List of international cricket grounds in Sri Lanka
