= Colts Cricket Club =

Sri Lankan cricket club

- කොල්ට්ස් ක්‍රිකට් සමාජය
- Colts Cricket Club Crest
- One Day name: Colts Cricket Club

Team information
- City: Colombo
- Colours: Chartreuse yellow
- Founded: 1873; 153 years ago
- Home ground: Colts Cricket Club Ground
- Capacity: 10,000

History
- Premier Trophy wins: 6
- Premier Limited Overs Tournament wins: 1
- Twenty20 Tournament wins: 0
- Notable players: Chaminda Vaas
- Official website: www.colombocolts.lk

Colts Cricket Club is a first-class cricket team based in Colombo, Sri Lanka. They have won 6 first class tournaments of Sri Lanka domestic league as in 1991/92, 1999/2000, 2001/02, 2004/05, 2008/09 and 2011/12 and 2 Premier Limited Overs Tournament as in 1998/99 and 2010/11.

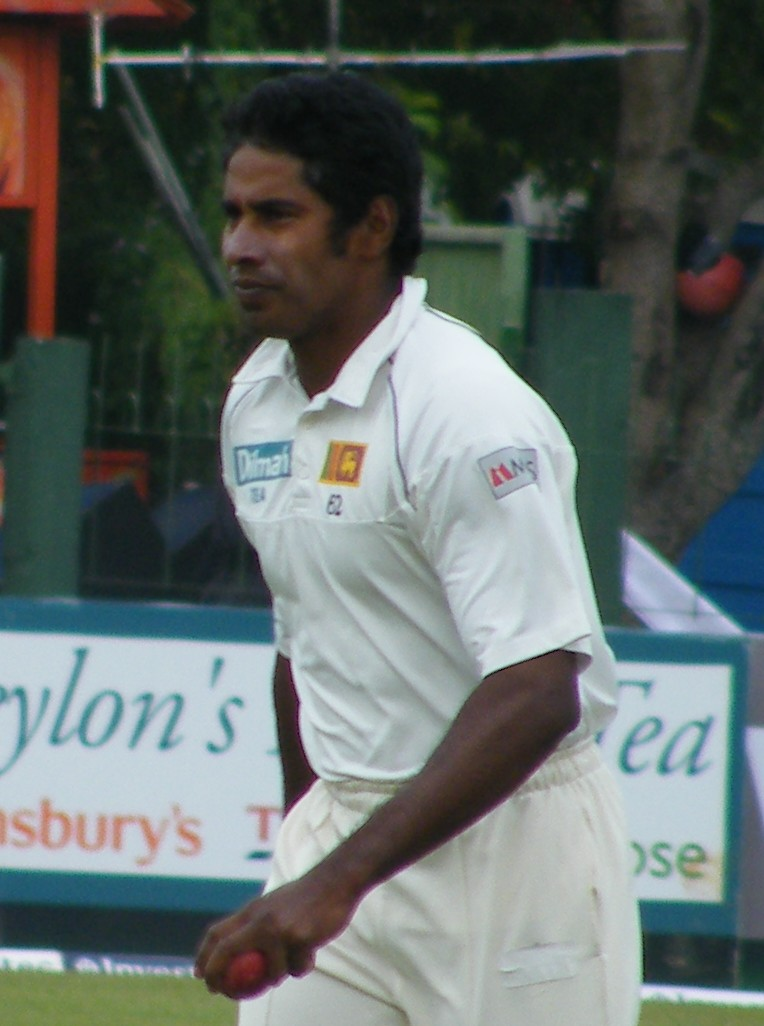
Notable former Colts cricketer Chaminda Vaas

== History ==
The club is officially known as Colombo Colts Cricket Club and was established in 1873 and re-organised in 1886. The club was originally based in Pettah, Colombo. The club has a first-class team and other teams like Club B, under-23 and under-25 as well as women's teams.

== Honours ==
- P Saravanamuttu Trophy (1)

1991–92

- Premier Trophy (5)

1999–00, 2001–02, 2004–05, 2008–09, 2011–12

== Current squad ==
These players featured in matches for Colts CC in 2019/20.

Players with international caps are listed in bold.

No	Name	Nat	Age	Batting style	Bowling style
Batsmen
28	**Avishka Fernando**	(Sri Lanka)	28	Right-handed	Right-arm medium-fast
49	**Priyamal Perera**	(Sri Lanka)	31	Right-handed	Right-arm off-break
43	Hashan Dumindu	(Sri Lanka)	31	Right-handed	Right-arm off-break
69	Sangeeth Cooray	(Sri Lanka)	31	Left-handed	Right-arm off-break
14	Santhush Gunathilake	(Sri Lanka)	27	Right-handed	Right-arm medium-fast
All-rounders
47	**Dilruwan Perera**	(Sri Lanka)	44	Right-handed	Right-arm off-break
17	Dhananjaya Lakshan	(Sri Lanka)	27	Right-handed	Right-arm medium-fast
73	Jehan Daniel	(Sri Lanka)	27	Right-handed	Right-arm medium-fast
–	Nalin Priyadarshana	(Sri Lanka)	36	Right-handed	Right-arm off-break
Wicket-keepers
23	**Sadeera Samarawickrama** (Captain)	(Sri Lanka)	31	Right-handed	–
55	**Kusal Perera**	(Sri Lanka)	36	Left-handed	–
Bowlers
4	**Akila Dananjaya**	(Sri Lanka)	32	Right-handed	Right-arm off-break
–	Nipun Ransika	(Sri Lanka)	27	Right-handed	Right-arm medium-fast
77	Nipun Malinga	(Sri Lanka)	26	Right-handed	Right-arm medium-fast
–	Mahesh Theekshana	(Sri Lanka)	26	Right-handed	Right-arm off-break

== Notable players ==
- Nuwan Kulasekara
- Angelo Mathews
- Thisara Perera
- Roshen Silva
- Chaminda Vaas
- Malinda Warnapura
- Roy Dias
- Gamini Goonesena
- Wirantha Fernando

== Home ground ==
Colts Cricket Club Ground is the club's primary venue for home matches.
