= Asgiriya Stadium =

Cricket stadium in Kandy, Sri Lanka

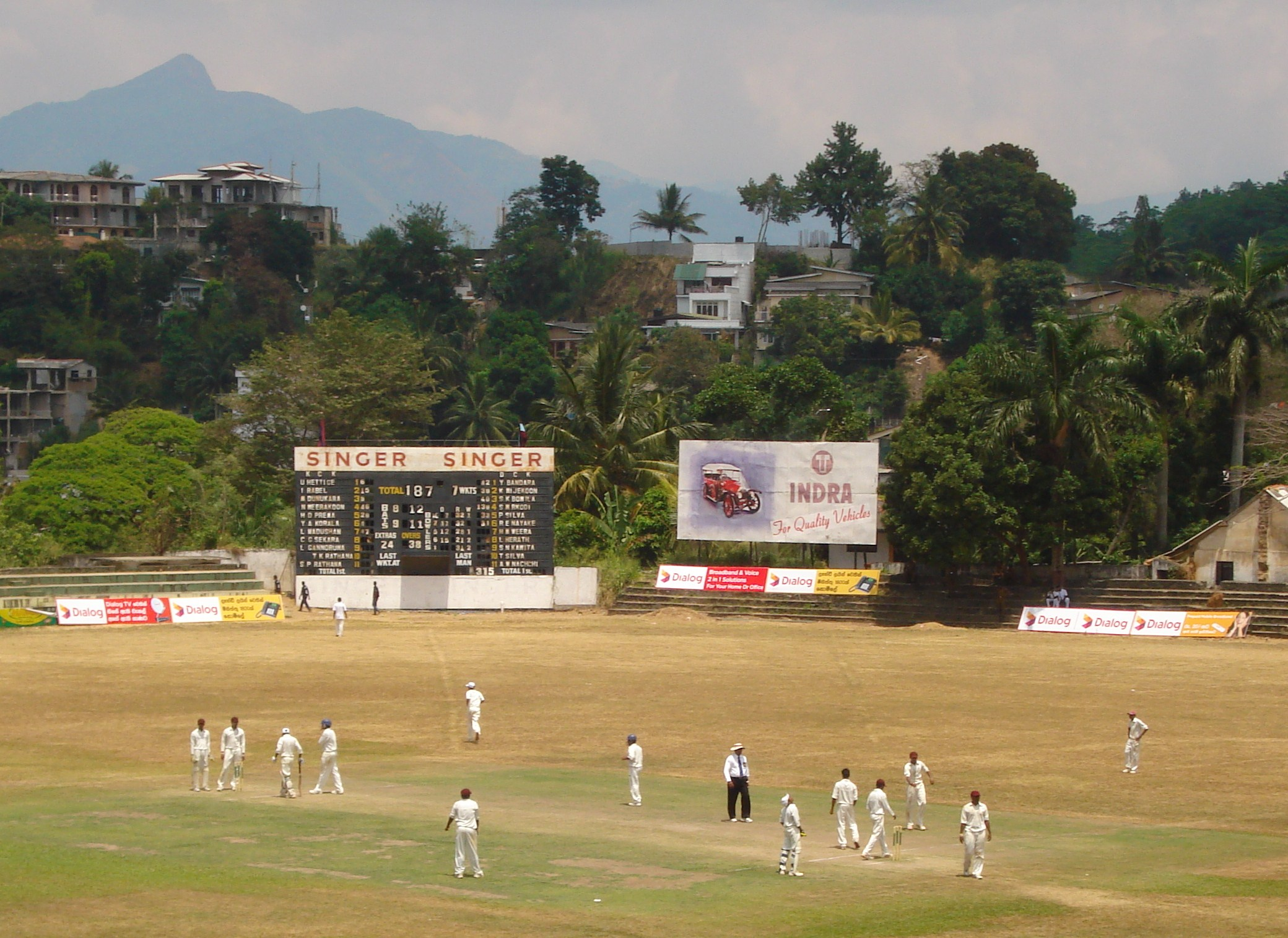
- 104th Dharmaraja–Kingswood Cricket Encounter
- Interactive map of Asgiriya Stadium

Ground information
- Location: Asgiriya, Kandy
- Country: Sri Lanka
- Coordinates: 7°18′00″N 80°38′03″E
- Establishment: 15 January 1915; 111 years ago
- Capacity: 10,300
- Owner: Trinity College
- Operator: Trinity College
- Tenants: Sri Lanka Cricket; Kandy Cricket Club
- End names
- Hunnasgiriya End; Hanthana End

International information
- First men's Test: 22–26 April 1983: Sri Lanka v Australia
- Last men's Test: 1–5 December 2007: Sri Lanka v England
- First men's ODI: 2 March 1986: Sri Lanka v Pakistan
- Last men's ODI: 16 December 2001: West Indies v Zimbabwe
- First women's ODI: 29 November 1997: Sri Lanka v Netherlands
- Last women's ODI: 25 April 2004: Sri Lanka v India

Team information
Sri Lanka national cricket team	(1983–2007)
- As of 19 August 2024; Source: ESPNcricinfo

Asgiriya Stadium, (Sinhala: අස්ගිරිය ක්‍රීඩාංගනය, Tamil: அஸ்கிரிய மைதானம்) is a cricket ground located in Kandy, Sri Lanka. Uniquely owned by Trinity College, Kandy, it is situated a short distance away from the city centre. Historically, it was a prominent venue for Test matches when international teams toured Sri Lanka. Asgiriya gained fame as the country's second Test cricket ground in 1982–83 when it hosted Greg Chappell's Australian team, following in the footsteps of the Paikiasothy Saravanamuttu Stadium.

== History ==
Before Asgiriya was built, Trinity College played its cricket matches at Bogambara Stadium. In 1904, when Rev. Alec Garden Fraser became Principal, he recognised the need for a suitable playing field and cricket pitch for the school. Fraser acquired an abandoned wasteland owned by the War Office, located in Asgiriya, just 270 meters from the school. The annual lease for this land was Rs. 30. In 1910, Trinity received permission to construct its own ground. Construction commenced in 1910 and was completed by 1915.

Governor Sir Robert Chalmers officially opened the ground on 15 January 1915. The inaugural inter-school match was contested between Trinity and S. Thomas' College, Mount Lavinia, on 24 and 25 February of the same year.

== International cricket venue ==
Prior to achieving Test status, Sri Lanka was mandated by the International Cricket Conference to enhance the infrastructure of its international cricket grounds. In response, Gamini Dissanayake, a former Trinity student and then Chairman of Board of Control for Cricket in Sri Lanka, spearheaded a rapid transformation of Asgiriya Stadium into an international venue. This project was completed within a short span of 150 days. President J. R. Jayewardene officially inaugurated the stadium on 5 January 1982. The stadium's pavilion was also opened by the President that same year.

Asgiriya Stadium hosted its first international cricket match against Australia in the 1982–83 season, becoming Sri Lanka's second Test venue after the Paikiasothy Saravanamuttu Stadium. It is also the 54th ground to host men's Test cricket.

Fifteen years after hosting its first Test match, Asgiriya Stadium witnessed Sri Lanka's first Test victory at the venue in 1998 against Zimbabwe.

This success was followed by an even more historic triumph in 1999 when Sri Lanka defeated Australia for the first time in Test cricket. The match is infamous for the horrific collision between Steve Waugh and Jason Gillespie, which resulted in serious injuries to both players and necessitated their airlift to Colombo for medical treatment.

The ground regularly hosted Test matches until the 2007-08 series against England. The 1st Test of the series, played at Asgiriya from 1–5 December 2007, holds a significant place in cricket history as Muttiah Muralitharan surpassed Shane Warne to become the leading Test wicket-taker.

== Cricket world cup ==
Asgiriya has also played host to a memorable 1996 Cricket World Cup match between Sri Lanka and Kenya. In this encounter, Sri Lanka amassed a then world record score of 398 runs, the highest ODI total at the time.

6 March 1996
Scorecard

Sri Lanka; 398/5 (50 overs)	v	Kenya; 254/7 (50 overs)
Aravinda de Silva 145 (115); Tito Odumbe 2/34 (5 overs)		Steve Tikolo 96 (95); M Muralitharan 2/40 (10 overs)

Sri Lanka won by 144 runs
Asgiriya Stadium, Asgiriya, Kandy, Sri Lanka
Umpires: Steve Dunne and V. K. Ramaswamy
Player of the match: Aravinda de Silva (Sri)

- Kenya won the toss and elected to ball first.

== Current infrastructure and usage ==
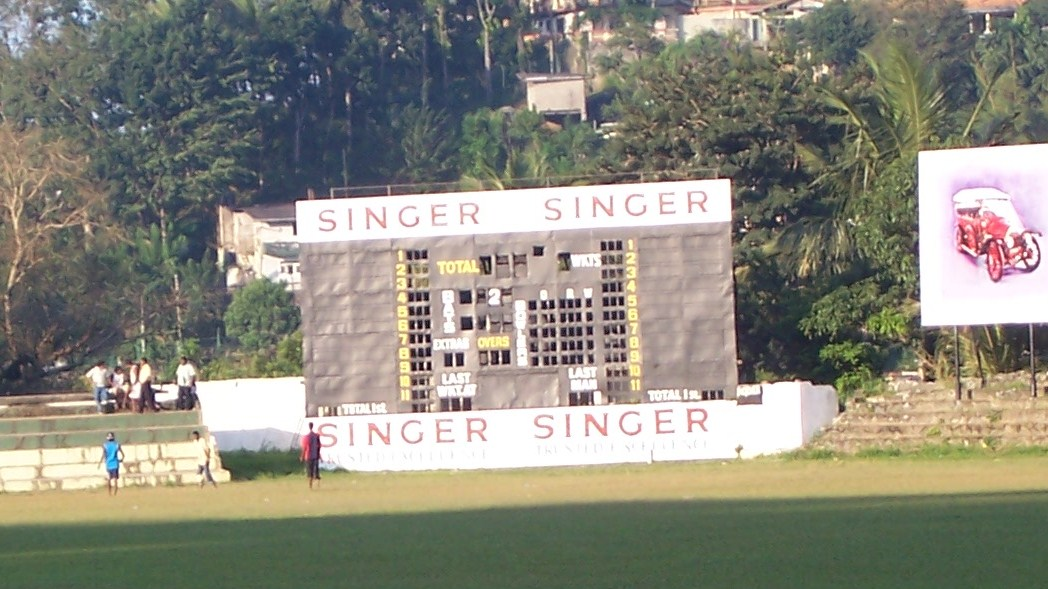
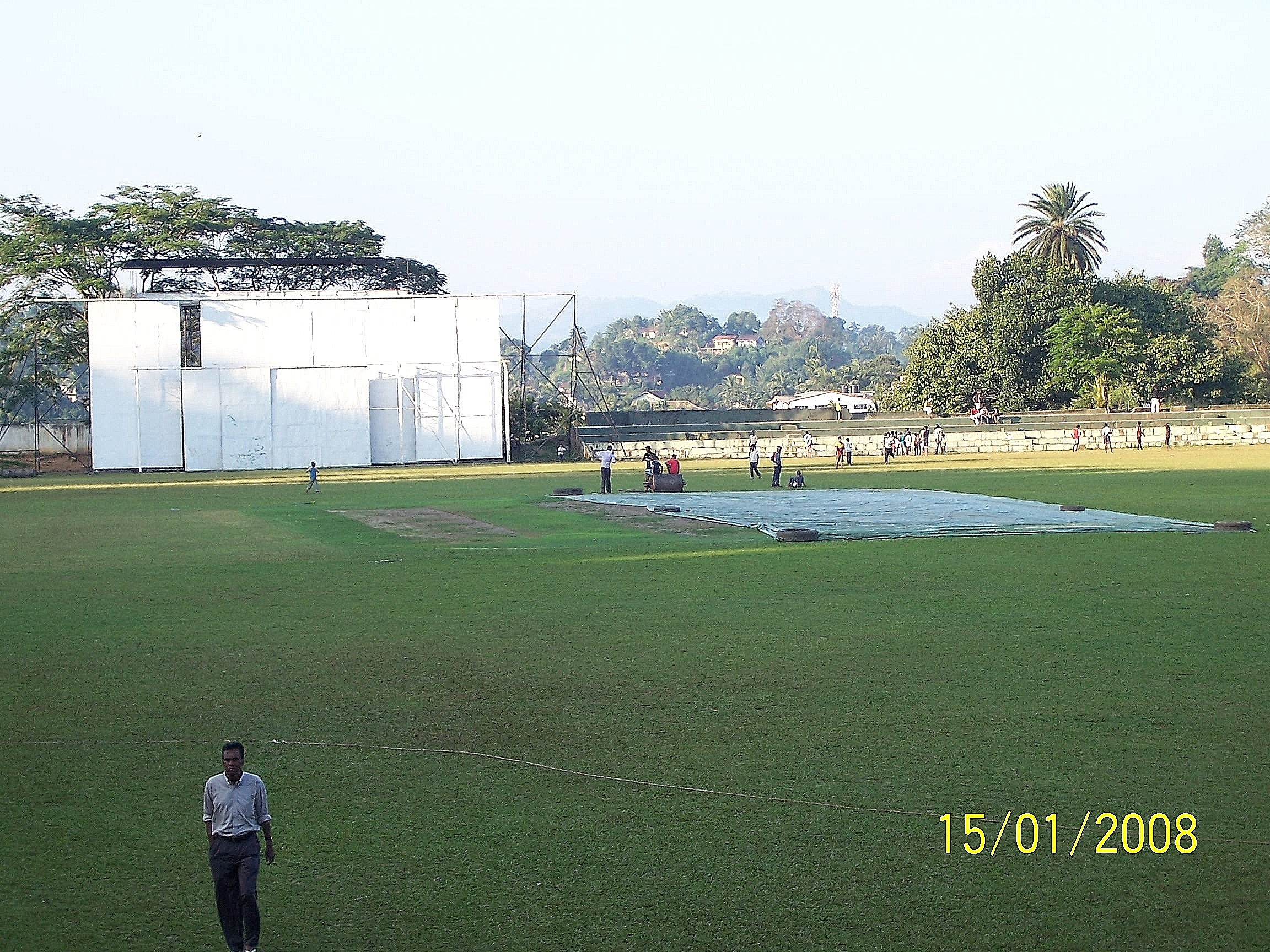
- Top: Asgiriya Stadium old score board.
- Bottom: The Hunnasgiriya-end of Asgiriya Stadium.

Asgiriya Stadium has hosted a total of 21 Test matches, with Sri Lanka securing seven victories. However, due to the construction of the Pallekele International Cricket Stadium, approximately 15 kilometers away, Sri Lanka Cricket gradually shifted the focus of international cricket to the newer venue. This transition began with the West Indies tour of Sri Lanka in 2010–11, where the final Test match of the series was hosted at Pallekele.

In December 2014, plans were unveiled to renovate and upgrade Asgiriya Stadium, including the installation of a new electronic scoreboard. In March 2020, Sri Lanka Cricket donated a sprinkler irrigation system to the stadium.

== Unique setting and legacy ==
Situated amidst the mountains of Kandy, Asgiriya Stadium is regarded by ESPNcricinfo as one of the most scenic cricket grounds in the world.

A distinctive feature of Asgiriya is its ownership and maintenance by Trinity College, an elite private boys' school. This makes it the only Test-class cricket stadium globally managed by a secondary educational institution. The ground has served as a breeding ground for numerous Sri Lankan cricketers who went on to represent the country at the highest level. Notable alumni include Ranjan Madugalle, Ravi Ratnayeke, Nilantha Ratnayake, Kumar Sangakkara, Kaushalya Weeraratne, and Niroshan Dickwella.

== Statistics and records ==
As of 19 August 2024

International matches
Format	Played	Won by		Drawn/ No result/ Tied	First match	Last match
Format	Played	Sri Lanka	Visitors	Drawn/ No result/ Tied	First match	Last match
Test matches	21	7	9	5	22–26 April 1983	1–5 December 2007
One-Day Internationals	6	3	2	1	2 March 1986	16 December 2001
Women's One-Day Internationals	4	2	2	–	29 November 1997	25 April 2004

== Key milestones ==
- 1892 – Cricket is introduced at Trinity College.
- 1909 – Work on Trinity's Asgiriya ground commence.
- 1915 – Governor Sir Robert Chalmers, declares open the new Asgiriya playing field with its pavilion and gymnasium.
- 1915 – The first inter-school cricket match to be played at Asgiriya takes place, between Trinity College, Kandy, and S. Thomas' College, Mount Lavinia. Trinity beat S. Thomas' by an innings and 18 runs. Sir Robert Chalmers graces the occasion.
- 1969 – Marylebone Cricket Club faced off against Central Province in a 50-over cricket match.
- 1982 – Asgiriya gains Test cricket venue status.
- 1983 – First Test match takes place, between Sri Lanka and Australia.
- 1986 – First ODI takes place, between Sri Lanka and Pakistan.
- 1996 – Hosts a 1996 Cricket World Cup fixture between Sri Lanka and Kenya with Sri Lanka making a record 398, the highest score at the time.
- 2001 – Sri Lanka cricketer Muttiah Muralitharan scored his only career half-century and his highest Test score of 67 against India at Kandy in 2001, which included three sixes and five fours.
