= Premier Limited Overs Tournament =

- Countries: Sri Lanka
- Administrator: Sri Lanka Cricket
- Format: List A cricket
- First edition: 1988–89
- Latest edition: 2019–20
- Current champion: Singhalese Sports Club (8th title)
- Most successful: Singhalese Sports Club (8 titles)
- Website: Premiere Limited Over Tournament

The Premier Limited Overs Tournament (currently known as AIA Premier Limited Overs Tournament for sponsorship reasons) is the main domestic limited overs cricket competition in Sri Lanka. It was established in 1988 and has existed under four different names. The 2016–17 tournament was cancelled due to a legal challenge from Negombo Cricket Club, after they were removed from Tier B of the 2016–17 Premier League Tournament. That year's edition was replaced by the 2016–17 Districts One Day Tournament. It was replaced with Major Clubs Limited Over Tournament in 2020-21.

== List of winners ==
Year	Venue	Final			Format	Teams
Year	Venue	Winners	Result	Runners-up	Format	Teams
Brown's Trophy
1988–89		Singhalese Sports Club				4
1989–90		Singhalese Sports Club				4
Hatna Trophy
1990–91		Singhalese Sports Club				8
1991–92		Nomads Sports Club				8
1992–93	Not held					
1993–94		Bloomfield Cricket and Athletic Club				8
1994–95	Not held					
1995–96		Nondescripts Cricket Club				16
1996–97		Bloomfield Cricket and Athletic Club				
1997–98		Nondescripts Cricket Club				
Premier Limited Overs Tournament
1998–99		Colts Cricket Club				
1999–00		Tamil Union Cricket and Athletic Club				
2000–01		Singhalese Sports Club				
2001–02		Nondescripts Cricket Club				
2002–03		Bloomfield Cricket and Athletic Club				
2003–04		Bloomfield Cricket and Athletic Club				
2004–05	Cancelled					
2005–06		Bloomfield Cricket and Athletic Club				
2006–07		Nondescripts Cricket Club				
2007–08		Singhalese Sports Club				
2008–09		Bloomfield Cricket and Athletic Club				
2009–10		Tamil Union Cricket and Athletic Club				
2010–11		Colts Cricket Club	Shared trophy	Singhalese Sports Club		
2011–12		Nondescripts Cricket Club				
2012-13		Ragama Cricket Club				
2013–14		Singhalese Sports Club				
2014–15		Colts Cricket Club				
2015–16		Nondescripts Cricket Club				
2016–17	Paikiasothy Saravanamuttu Stadium, Colombo	Colombo District	Won by 72 runs	Kegalle District	Group round-robin, Knockout, Final	24
2017–18	Paikiasothy Saravanamuttu Stadium, Colombo	Singhalese Sports Club; 219/2 (41.5 overs)	Won by 4 wickets	Nondescripts Cricket Club; 219/2 (41.5 overs)	Group round-robin, Knockout, Final	23
2018–19	R. Premadasa Stadium, Colombo	Singhalese Sports Club	Won by 7 wickets	Colombo Cricket Club	Group round-robin, Knockout, Final	24
2019–20	Singhalese Sports Club Cricket Ground, Colombo	Chilaw Marians Cricket Club	Won by 91 runs	Nondescripts Cricket Club	Group round-robin, Knockout, Final	25
Replaced with Major Clubs Limited Over Tournament

== See also ==
- Major Clubs Limited Over Tournament

== External sources ==
- CricketArchive – Tournaments in Sri Lanka
- Premier Limited Over Tournament 2013/14 Sri Lanka
