= Major League Tournament (Sri Lanka) =

First-class cricket tournament in Sri Lanka

- Countries: Sri Lanka
- Administrator: Sri Lanka Cricket
- Format: First-class cricket
- First edition: 1988–89
- Latest edition: 2025–26
- Tournament format: Two group leagues and a final between group winners
- Number of teams: 26
- Current champion: Colombo Cricket Club (8th title)
- Most successful: Singhalese Sports Club (32 titles)
- 2026–27

The Major League Tournament (formerly known as the Premier Trophy) is the main domestic first-class cricket competition in Sri Lanka. It was established in 1938 and has existed under a number of different names. Matches before the 1988–89 season are not considered first-class. Relaunched as the Lakspray Trophy in 1988–89, it was renamed as the P. Saravanamuttu Trophy in 1990–91 and as the Premier Championship in 1998–99. There was a change of format in 2015–16 when it became the Premier League Tournament which was split into Tiers A and B the following year.

The league was cancelled in 2020–21 due to the COVID-19 pandemic and then a new temporary tournament was introduced in 2021–22 called the National Super Provincial 4-Day Tournament. This was contested by five provincial teams: Colombo District, Dambulla District, Galle District, Jaffna District and Kandy District. They played each other once each and then the top four went into a knockout semi-final round followed by a championship final in which Kandy District defeated Jaffna District, 7–10 April 2022.

Ahead of the 2022–23 season, the competition was relaunched with a rebranding as the Major League Tournament. The 26 first-class clubs are split into Groups A and B, each team playing the others in its group once each, and the two group winners meeting in a championship final. A tiered promotion and relegation system was also introduced, with the Governor's Trophy 2-Day Tournament acting as the lower tier.

== Teams ==
The Major League Tournament in 2025–26 was split into Group A and Group B leagues, with seven teams in each. The following teams were involved:

=== Group A ===
- Bloomfield Cricket and Athletic Club
- Chilaw Marians Cricket Club
- Colombo Cricket Club
- Colts Cricket Club
- Nugegoda Sports and Welfare Club
- Panadura Sports Club
- Police Sports Club

=== Group B ===
- Ace Capital Cricket Club
- Badureliya Sports Club
- Burgher Recreation Club
- Kurunegala Youth Cricket Club
- Moors Sports Club
- Nondescripts Cricket Club
- Tamil Union Cricket and Athletic Club

=== Former MLT teams (pre-2025/26) ===
- Galle Cricket Club
- Kalutara Town Club
- Kandy Customs Cricket Club
- Lankan Cricket Club
- Negombo Cricket Club
- Ragama Cricket Club
- Saracens Sports Club
- Sebastianites Cricket and Athletic Club
- Sinhalese Sports Club
- Sri Lanka Air Force Sports Club
- Sri Lanka Army Sports Club
- Sri Lanka Navy Sports Club

== List of winners ==
The champion team in each season since 1938 has been:

=== Daily News Trophy ===
1938 Kalutara Town Club
1938–39 Singhalese Sports Club
1939–40 Singhalese Sports Club
1940–41 Saracens Sports Club
1941–42 No competition
1942–43 No competition
1943–44 Singhalese Sports Club
1944–45 Singhalese Sports Club
1945–46 Tamil Union C & A Club
1946–47 Singhalese Sports Club
1947–48 Singhalese Sports Club
1948–49 Singhalese Sports Club
1949–50 Singhalese Sports Club

=== P. Saravanamuttu Trophy ===
1950–51 Tamil Union C & A Club
1951–52 Singhalese Sports Club
1952–53 Nondescripts Cricket Club
1953–54 Nondescripts Cricket Club
1954–55 Nondescripts Cricket Club
1955–56 Burgher Recreation Club
1956–57 Nondescripts Cricket Club
1957–58 Nondescripts Cricket Club
1958–59 Singhalese Sports Club
1959–60 Singhalese Sports Club
1960–61 Nondescripts Cricket Club
1961–62 Singhalese Sports Club
1962–63 University
1963–64 Bloomfield C & AC
1964–65 Nomads Sports Club
1965–66 No competition
1966–67 Singhalese Sports Club
1967–68 Nomads Sports Club
1968–69 Singhalese Sports Club
1969–70 Nondescripts Cricket Club
1970–71 Nondescripts Cricket Club
1971–72 Singhalese Sports Club
1972–73 Singhalese Sports Club
1973–74 Singhalese Sports Club
1974–75 Singhalese Sports Club
1975–76 Nondescripts Cricket Club

=== Robert Senanayake Trophy ===
1976–77 Nondescripts Cricket Club
1977–78 Singhalese Sports Club
1978–79 Nondescripts Cricket Club
1979–80 Colombo Cricket Club
1980–81 Bloomfield C & AC
1981–82 Bloomfield C & AC

=== Lakspray Trophy ===
1982–83 Bloomfield C & AC
1983–84 Singhalese Sports Club
1984–85 Colombo Cricket Club
1985–86 Singhalese Sports Club & Nondescripts Cricket Club
1986–87 Singhalese Sports Club
1987–88 Colombo Cricket Club
1988–89 Nondescripts Cricket Club & Singhalese Sports Club (inaugural first-class season)
1989–90 Singhalese Sports Club
1990–91 Singhalese Sports Club

=== P. Saravanamuttu Trophy ===
1991–92 Colts Cricket Club
1992–93 Singhalese Sports Club
1993–94 Nondescripts Cricket Club
1994–95 Singhalese Sports Club and Bloomfield C & AC
1995–96 Colombo Cricket Club
1996–97 Bloomfield C & AC
1997–98 Singhalese Sports Club

=== Premier Championship ===
1998–99 Bloomfield C & AC
1999–00 Colts Cricket Club
2000–01 Nondescripts Cricket Club
2001–02 Colts Cricket Club
2002–03 Moors Sports Club
2003–04 Bloomfield C & AC
2004–05 Colts Cricket Club
2005–06 Singhalese Sports Club
2006–07 Colombo Cricket Club
2007–08 Singhalese Sports Club
2008–09 Colts Cricket Club
2009–10 Chilaw Marians Cricket Club
2010–11 Bloomfield C & AC
2011–12 Colts Cricket Club
2012–13 Singhalese Sports Club
2013–14 Nondescripts Cricket Club
2014–15 Sri Lanka Ports Authority Cricket Club

=== Premier League Tournament ===
2015–16 Tamil Union Cricket and Athletic Club
2016–17 Singhalese Sports Club
2017–18 Chilaw Marians Cricket Club
2018–19 Colombo Cricket Club
2019–20 Colombo Cricket Club
2020–21 cancelled due to COVID-19 pandemic
2021–22 replaced by temporary regional competition

=== Major League Tournament ===
2022–23 Colombo Cricket Club
2023–24 Sinhalese Sports Club and Police Sports Club
2024–25 Bloomfield C & AC
2025–26 Colts Cricket Club
2026–27

== Wins by Clubs ==
- † Extinct Clubs * Shared title

| Club | Wins | Winning years |
|---|---|---|
| Singhalese Sports Club | 32 | 1938–39, 1939–40, 1943–44, 1944–45, 1946–47, 1947–48, 1948–49, 1949–50, 1951–52, 1958–59, 1959–60, 1961–62, 1966–67, 1968–69, 1971–72, 1972–73, 1973–74, 1974–75, 1977–78, 1983–84, 1985–86*, 1986–87, 1988–89*, 1989–90, 1990–91, 1992–93, 1994–95*, 1997–98, 2005–06, 2007–08, 2012–13, 2016–17 |
| Nondescripts Cricket Club | 16 | 1952–53, 1953–54, 1954–55, 1956–57, 1957–58, 1960–61, 1969–70, 1970–71, 1975–76, 1976–77, 1978–79, 1985–86, 1988–89*, 1993–94, 2000–01, 2013–14 |
| Bloomfield Cricket and Athletic Club | 9 | 1963–64, 1980–81, 1981–82, 1982–83, 1994–95*, 1996–97, 1998–99, 2003–04, 2010–11 |
| Colombo Cricket Club | 8 | 1979–80, 1984–85, 1987–88, 1995–96, 2006–07, 2018–19, 2019–20, 2022–23 |
| Colts Cricket Club | 7 | 1991–92, 1999–00, 2001–02, 2004–05, 2008–09, 2011–12, 2025–26 |
| Tamil Union Cricket and Athletic Club | 3 | 1945–46, 1950–51, 2015–16 |
| †Nomads Sports Club | 2 | 1964–65, 1967–68 |
| Chilaw Marians Cricket Club | 2 | 2009–10, 2017–18 |
| Kalutara Town Club | 1 | 1938 |
| Saracens Sports Club | 1 | 1940–41 |
| Burgher Recreation Club | 1 | 1955–56 |
| †University | 1 | 1962–63 |
| Moors Sports Club | 1 | 2002–03 |
| Sri Lanka Ports Authority Cricket Club | 1 | 2014–15 |
