= National Super League Limited Over Tournament =

Sri Lankan cricket tournament

- Countries: Sri Lanka
- Administrator: Sri Lanka Cricket
- Format: List A
- First edition: 2022
- Latest edition: 2024
- Next edition: 2025
- Tournament format: Double round-robin and final
- Number of teams: 5
- Current champion: Dambulla District
- Most successful: Dambulla District (2 title)
- 2024 National Super League Limited Over Tournament

The National Super League Limited Over Tournament is a domestic List A cricket competition, which is held annually in Sri Lanka. Five cricket teams representing five districts of the country take part in the tournament. The league is organized by the Sri Lanka Cricket (SLC) beginning in the 2022 season. In January 2022, the SLC launched the tournament. The squads for the competition are announced based on the performances in the Major Clubs Limited Over Tournament, with 26 clubs clustered under five teams. The tournament runs alongside the National Super League 4-Day Tournament.

== Teams ==
Team	Clubs	Titles	Runners-up
Colombo District	Saracens Sports Club; Singhalese Sports Club; Negombo Cricket Club; Sebastianites Cricket and Athletic Club; Sri Lanka Police Sports Club	1	0
Dambulla District	Colombo Cricket Club; Burgher Recreation Club; Sri Lanka Navy Sports Club; Badureliya Sports Club; Kurunegala Youth Cricket Club; Nugegoda Sports and Welfare Club	2	0
Galle District	Colts Cricket Club; Sri Lanka Army Sports Club; Panadura Sports Club; Galle Cricket Club; Moors Sports Club	0	0
Jaffna District	Tamil Union Cricket and Athletic Club; Ragama Cricket Club; Lankan Cricket Club; Kalutara Town Club; Bloomfield Cricket and Athletic Club	1	2
Kandy District	Nondescripts Cricket Club; Chilaw Marians Cricket Club; Ace Capital Cricket Club; Sri Lanka Air Force Sports Club; Kandy Customs Sports Club	0	2

== Winners ==
Season	Winner	Runner-up	Source
2022	Jaffna District	Kandy District	
2023	Dambulla District	Jaffna District	
2024	Dambulla District	Kandy District	
2025	Colombo District	Jaffna District	
2026			
