= 2025 Major Clubs Limited Over Tournament =

6th edition of Major Clubs Limited Over Tournament

- Dates: 27 June – 29 July 2025
- Administrator: Sri Lanka Cricket
- Cricket format: List A cricket
- Tournament format(s): Round-robin and knockout
- Host: Sri Lanka
- Champions: Colombo (1st title)
- Participants: 14
- Matches: 45
- Most runs: Sangeeth Cooray (408)
- Most wickets: Vijaykanth Viyaskanth (20)

The 2025 Major Clubs Limited Over Tournament was the 6th edition of the Major Clubs Limited Over Tournament, a List A cricket competition in Sri Lanka. The tournament began on 27 June 2025 and the final match was held on 29 July 2025.

Ace Capital are the defending champions.

Colombo Cricket Club won their maiden title after defeating Sri Lanka Police Sports Club in the final.

== Teams ==
The teams were placed into the following groups:

- Group A: Ace Capitals, Badureliya Sports, Chilaw Marians, Nondescripts, Police Club, Panadura Sports, Tamil Union
- Group B: Bloomfield, Burgher Recreation, Colombo, Colts Cricket, Kurunegala Youth, Moors Sports, Nugedoda Sports

== Standings ==
=== Group A ===
Pos	Team	Pld	W	L	NR	Pts	NRR
1	Police Club	6	5	1	0	10	1.271
2	Tamil Union	6	4	2	0	8	0.935
3	Nondescripts	6	4	2	0	8	−0.047
4	Pandura	6	2	4	0	4	−0.140
5	Ace Capital	6	2	4	0	4	−0.419
6	Chilaw Marians	6	2	4	0	4	−0.641
7	Badureliya	6	2	4	0	4	−0.961

Source: ESPNcricinfo

Advance to semi-finals

=== Group A Match summary ===
Team	Group matches					
Team	1	2	3	4	5	6
Ace Capital	0	0	0	2	2	4
Badureliya	0	2	2	2	2	4
Chilaw Marians	2	2	4	4	4	4
Nondescripts	0	2	4	4	6	8
Pandura	0	0	2	2	4	4
Police Club	2	4	6	8	10	10
Tamil Union	2	2	4	4	6	8

Win	Loss	Tie	No result	Eliminated

- Note: The total points at the end of each group match are listed.
- Note: Click on the points or results to see the match summary.

=== Group B ===
Pos	Team	Pld	W	L	NR	Pts	NRR
1	Colombo	6	5	1	0	10	1.979
2	Colts	6	5	1	0	10	1.271
3	Moors	6	5	1	0	10	1.234
4	Bloomfield	6	3	3	0	6	−0.036
5	Burgher	6	1	5	0	2	−1.109
6	Nugegoda	6	1	5	0	2	−1.154
7	Kurunegala	6	1	5	0	2	−1.501

Source: ESPNcricinfo

Advance to semi-finals

=== Group B Match summary ===
Team	Group matches					
Team	1	2	3	4	5	6
Bloomfield	0	2	4	6	6	6
Burgher	0	0	0	0	0	2
Colombo	2	4	4	6	8	10
Colts	0	2	4	6	8	10
Kurunegala	0	0	0	0	2	2
Moors	2	2	4	6	8	10
Nugegoda	2	2	2	2	2	2

Win	Loss	Tie	No result	Eliminated

- Note: The total points at the end of each group match are listed.
- Note: Click on the points or results to see the match summary.

== Knockout stage ==
Semi-finals
A1	Police Club	144/6 (35.5 overs)
B2	Colts	143 (39 overs)
B1	Colombo	309/7 (50 overs)
A2	Tamil Union	241 (41.1 overs)

Final
SF1	Police Club	200 (40.2 overs)
SF2	Colombo	387/5 (50 overs)

=== Semi-finals ===
==== Semi-final 1 ====
25 July 2025
14:30 (D/N)
Scorecard

Colts; 143 (39 overs)	v	Police Club; 144/6 (35.5 overs)
Dhananjaya Lakshan 33 (37); Dilum Sudeera 4/36 (9 overs)		Ashen Bandara 55* (84); Dunith Wellalage 2/22 (9.5 overs)

Police Club won by 4 wickets
Colombo Cricket Club Ground, Colombo
Umpires: Ravindra Kottahachchi and Prageeth Rambukwella

- Police Club won the toss and elected to field.

==== Semi-final 2 ====
27 July 2025
14:30 (D/N)
Scorecard

Colombo; 309/7 (50 overs)	v	Tamil Union; 241 (41.1 overs)
Sonal Dinusha 83* (72); Vijayakanth Viyaskanth 4/52 (10 overs)		Sithara Hapuhinna 76 (75); Kamindu Mendis 4/43 (10 overs)

Colombo won by 68 runs
Colombo Cricket Club Ground, Colombo
Umpires: Chandrika Amarasinghe and Lyndon Hannibal

- Tamil Union won the toss and elected to field.

=== Final ===
29 July 2025
14:30 (D/N)
Scorecard

Colombo; 387/5 (50 overs)	v	Police Club; 200 (40.2 overs)
Pavan Rathnayake 158* (94); Charuka Jayathilake 2/65 (8 overs)		Priyamal Perera 57 (56); Inuka Karannagoda 4/32 (9.2 overs)

Colombo won by 187 runs
Colombo Cricket Club Ground, Colombo
Umpires: Ruchira Palliyaguruge and Prageeth Rambukwella

- Colombo won the toss and elected to bat.
