= 2024 Major Clubs Limited Over Tournament =

Cricket tournament

- Dates: 10 June – 11 August 2024
- Administrator: Sri Lanka Cricket
- Cricket format: List A cricket
- Tournament format: Round-robin then knockout
- Host: Sri Lanka
- Champions: Ace Capital (1st title)
- Participants: 18
- Matches: 75
- Most runs: Pavan Rathnayake (Colombo) (494)
- Most wickets: Chaturanga de Silva (Colombo) (19); Wanuja Sahan (Ace Capital) (19)

The 2024 Major Clubs Limited Over Tournament was the 5th edition of the Major Clubs Limited Over Tournament, a List A cricket competition in Sri Lanka. The tournament began on 10 June 2024 and the last match will be held on 11 August 2024. Singhalese Sports Club were the defending champions.

== Teams ==
The teams were placed into the following groups:

- Group A: Panadura SC, Ace Capital CC, Negombo CC, Bloomfield C & AC, Chilaw MCC, Ragama CC, Tamil Union C & AC, Panadura SC, Singhalese Sports Club, NCC
- Group B: Colts CC, Badureliya CC, Kurunegala YCC, Kandy Customs SC, Police SC, Nugegoda S & WC, BRC, Moors SC, CCC

== Standings ==
=== Group A ===
Pos	Team	Pld	W	L	T	NR	Pts	NRR
1	Ace Capital	8	6	1	0	1	13	0.704
2	Singhalese	8	5	1	0	2	12	1.170
3	Nondescripts	8	5	2	0	1	11	1.090
4	Bloomfield	8	3	3	0	2	8	−0.533
5	Ragama	8	3	4	0	1	7	0.214
6	Tamil Union	8	3	4	0	1	7	−0.179
7	Chilaw Marians	8	2	4	0	2	6	−0.302
8	Negombo	8	2	6	0	0	4	−0.818
9	Panadura	8	1	5	0	2	4	−1.500

Source: ESPNcricinfo

Advance to semi-finals

=== Group B ===
Pos	Team	Pld	W	L	T	NR	Pts	NRR
1	Colombo	8	6	0	0	2	14	3.466
2	Moors	8	5	2	0	1	11	0.306
3	Burgher	8	5	3	0	0	10	0.187
4	Badureliya	8	4	2	0	2	10	0.974
5	Colts	8	4	3	0	1	9	0.116
6	Kandy Customs	8	2	5	0	1	5	−0.847
7	Police Club	8	2	5	0	1	5	−0.896
8	Nugegoda	8	1	4	0	3	5	−0.526
9	Kurunegala	8	1	6	0	1	3	−1.305

Source: ESPNcricinfo

Advance to semi-finals

== Knockout stage ==
Semi-finals
A1	Ace Capital	222 (49.3)
B2	Moors	124 (25.4)
B1	Colombo	245/2 (35.3)
A2	Singhalese	239 (48.3)

Final
SF1	Ace Capital	254/6 (49.1)
SF2	Colombo	251 (45.5)

=== Semi-finals ===
==== Semi-final 1 ====
8 August 2024
09:45
Scorecard

Ace Capital; 222 (49.3 overs)	v	Moors; 124 (25.4 overs)
Wanuja Sahan 60 (62); Danushka Udara 4/39 (10 overs)		Pasindu Sooriyabandara 43 (37); Sithum Disanayaka 4/40 (7 overs)

Ace Capital won by 98 runs
Sinhalese Sports Club Ground, Colombo
Umpires: Ravindra Kottahachchi and Prageeth Rambukwella

- Moors won the toss and elected to field.

==== Semi-final 2 ====
8 August 2024
09:45
Scorecard

Singhalese; 239 (48.3 overs)	v	Colombo; 245/2 (35.3 overs)
Nuwanidu Fernando 61 (59); Chaturanga de Silva 3/41 (10 overs)		Pavan Rathnayake 157* (117); Pramod Madushan 1/43 (7 overs)

Colombo won by 8 wickets
P Sara Oval, Colombo
Umpires: Lyndon Hannibal and Chamara de Soysa

- Colombo won the toss and elected to field.

=== Final ===
11 August 2024
09:45
Scorecard

Colombo; 251 (45.5 overs)	v	Ace Capital; 254/6 (49.1 overs)
Isuru Udana 80 (46); Wanuja Sahan 3/47 (10 overs)		Sammu Ashan 97* (111); Sonal Dinusha 2/33 (10 overs)

Ace Capital won by 4 wickets
Sinhalese Sports Club Ground, Colombo
Umpires: Ruchira Palliyaguruge and Raveendra Wimalasiri

- Ace Capital won the toss and elected to field.
