= 2026 Major Clubs Limited Over Tournament =

7th edition of Major Clubs Limited Over Tournament

- Dates: 10 August – 11 September 2026
- Administrator: Sri Lanka Cricket
- Cricket format: List A cricket
- Tournament format(s): Round-robin and knockout
- Host: Sri Lanka
- Participants: 14
- Matches: 45

The 2026 Major Clubs Limited Over Tournament was the 7th edition of the Major Clubs Limited Over Tournament, a List A cricket competition in Sri Lanka. The tournament began on 10 August 2026 and the final match was held on 11 September 2026.

Colombo Cricket Club are the defending champions.

== Teams ==
The teams were placed into the following groups:

- Group A: Ace Capitals, Badureliya Sports, Chilaw Marians, Nondescripts, Police Club, Panadura Sports, Tamil Union
- Group B: Bloomfield, Burgher Recreation, Colombo, Colts Cricket, Kurunegala Youth, Moors Sports, Nugedoda Sports

== Standings ==
=== Group A ===
| Pos | Team | Pld | W | L | NR | Pts | NRR |
|---|---|---|---|---|---|---|---|
| 1 | Colombo | 6 | 5 | 1 | 0 | 10 | 1.599 |
| 2 | Moors | 6 | 4 | 1 | 1 | 9 | 0.740 |
| 3 | Ace Capital | 6 | 4 | 2 | 0 | 8 | 0.262 |
| 4 | Pandura | 6 | 3 | 2 | 1 | 7 | −0.315 |
| 5 | Tamil Union | 6 | 2 | 4 | 0 | 4 | 0.013 |
| 6 | Nugegoda | 6 | 2 | 4 | 0 | 4 | −0.330 |
| 7 | Kurunegala Youth | 6 | 0 | 6 | 0 | 0 | −1.848 |

Updated to match(es) played on 3 September 2026. Source: Cricinfo

Advance to semi-finals

=== Group A Match summary ===
| Team | Group matches | | | | | |
| Team | 1 | 2 | 3 | 4 | 5 | 6 |
|---|---|---|---|---|---|---|
| Ace Capital | | | | | | |
| Colombo | | | | | | |
| Kurunegala Youth | | | | | | |
| Moors | | | | | | |
| Nugegoda | | | | | | |
| Pandura | | | | | | |
| Tamil Union | | | | | | |

| Win | Loss | Tie | No result | Eliminated |

- Note: The total points at the end of each group match are listed.
- Note: Click on the points or results to see the match summary.

=== Group B ===
| Pos | Team | Pld | W | L | NR | Pts | NRR |
|---|---|---|---|---|---|---|---|
| 1 | Colts | 6 | 5 | 1 | 0 | 10 | 1.186 |
| 2 | Singhalese | 6 | 4 | 1 | 1 | 9 | 1.142 |
| 3 | Nondescripts | 6 | 3 | 3 | 0 | 6 | 0.386 |
| 4 | Bloomfield | 6 | 3 | 3 | 0 | 6 | 0.000 |
| 5 | Sri Lanka Police | 6 | 3 | 3 | 0 | 6 | −0.373 |
| 6 | Burgher | 6 | 2 | 3 | 1 | 5 | −0.347 |
| 7 | Badureliya | 6 | 0 | 6 | 0 | 0 | −1.666 |

First match(es) will be played: unknown. Source: Cricinfo

Advance to semi-finals

=== Group B Match summary ===
| Team | Group matches | | | | | |
| Team | 1 | 2 | 3 | 4 | 5 | 6 |
|---|---|---|---|---|---|---|
| Badureliya | | | | | | |
| Bloomfield | | | | | | |
| Burgher | | | | | | |
| Colts | | | | | | |
| Nondescripts | | | | | | |
| Singhalese | | | | | | |
| Sri Lanka Police | | | | | | |

| Win | Loss | Tie | No result | Eliminated |

- Note: The total points at the end of each group match are listed.
- Note: Click on the points or results to see the match summary.

== Knockout stage ==
Semi-finals

Final

=== Semi-finals ===
==== Semi-final 1 ====
| v |

==== Semi-final 2 ====
| v |

=== Final ===
11 September 2026
14:30 (D/N)
Scorecard

| Moors Sports Club; 260 (49.5 overs) | v | Singhalese Sports Club; 235 (49.5 overs) |
| Ramesh Mendis 85 (91); Prabath Jayasuriya 4/44 (10 overs) | | Nipun Dhananjaya 98 (112); Induwara Udena 4/49 (10 overs) |

Moors Sports Club won by 25 runs
R. Premadasa Stadium, Colombo
Umpires: Chamara de Soysa (SL) and Raveendra Wimalasiri (SL)
Player of the match: Ramesh Mendis (Moors Sports Club)

- Singhalese Sports Club won the toss and elected to field.
