= Sri Lankan cricket team in India in 1993–94 =

International cricket tour

Sri Lanka cricket team in India in 1993-94
	India	Sri Lanka
- Dates: 22 January – 20 February 1994
Captains	Mohammed Azharuddin	Arjuna Ranatunga

Test series
- Result: India won the 3-match series 3–0
Most runs	Mohammed Azharuddin (307)	Roshan Mahanama (282)
Most wickets	Anil Kumble (21)	Muttiah Muralitharan (12)
- Player of the series: Mohammed Azharuddin (Ind)

One Day International series
- Results: India won the 3-match series 2–1
Most runs	Navjot Singh Sidhu (233)	Arjuna Ranatunga (106)
Most wickets	Manoj Prabhakar (5)	Muttiah Muralitharan (3)
- Player of the series: Navjot Singh Sidhu (Ind)

The Sri Lanka national cricket team are toured India in January and February 1994 to play three Test matches and three One Day Internationals (ODIs).

The tour followed the Sri Lankan's participation in the 1993 Hero Cup, where they reached the semi-final and was surrounded by controversy.

Sri Lanka only toured India after the Pakistan national cricket team pulled out citing security concerns. The Sri Lankan team manager, Bandula Warnapura, as was the case a few months earlier at the Hero Cup, blamed the batting failures of the first two test matches on poor umpiring decisions.

The series was played on spin-friendly pitches on which India had built up a formidable record. India won their eighth straight home win since the defeat of Sri Lanka in 1990-91 and their second successive series whitewash after beating England in 1992-93. Contrary to popular beliefs of the time that test matches in India produced boring draws, this series meant that the last 12 tests, from Madras in 1987-88 had produced a result- 11 wins for India. Azharuddin joined Mansoor Ali Khan Pataudi and Sunil Gavaskar as India's most successful captains, with 9 wins each.

Further cause for celebration for India came when Kapil Dev became test cricket's highest wicket-taker, surpassing Richard Hadlee's tally of 431, which had stood for three and a half years.

== Squads ==
Tests		ODIs	
India	Sri Lanka	India	Sri Lanka
Mohammad Azharuddin (c); Sachin Tendulkar; Kapil Dev; Manoj Prabhakar; Navjot Singh Sidhu; Vinod Kambli; Sanjay Manjrekar; Venkatapathy Raju; Anil Kumble; Rajesh Chauhan; Nayan Mongia (wk)	Arjuna Ranatunga (c); Roshan Mahanama; Dulip Samaraweera; Hashan Tillakaratne; Aravinda de Silva; Ruwan Kalpage; Dulip Liyanage; Don Anurasiri; Pramodya Wickramasinghe; Muttiah Muralitharan; Pubudu Dassanayake (wk); Marvan Atapattu	Mohammad Azharuddin (c); Sachin Tendulkar; Kapil Dev; Manoj Prabhakar; Navjot Singh Sidhu; Vinod Kambli; Sanjay Manjrekar; Venkatapathy Raju; Anil Kumble; Rajesh Chauhan; Nayan Mongia (wk); Pravin Amre; Ajay Jadeja; Salil Ankola	Arjuna Ranatunga (c); Roshan Mahanama; Dulip Samaraweera; Hashan Tillakaratne; Aravinda de Silva; Ruwan Kalpage; Dulip Liyanage; Don Anurasiri; Pramodya Wickramasinghe; Muttiah Muralitharan; Nisal Fernando (wk); Marvan Atapattu; Sanath Jayasuriya; Chaminda Vaas; Ravindra Pushpakumara

== Test series ==
=== 1st Test ===
18–22 January 1994
Scorecard

India	v	Sri Lanka
511 (161.5 overs); Sachin Tendulkar 142 (224); Muttiah Muralitharan 5/162 (41.5 overs)		218 (106.4 overs); Roshan Mahanama 73 (167); Anil Kumble 4/69 (37 overs)
		174 (73.3 overs); Hashan Tillakaratne 47 (87); Anil Kumble 7/59 (27.3 overs)

India won by an innings and 119 runs
K. D. Singh Babu Stadium, Lucknow
Umpires: Raman Sharma (Ind) and Srinivasaraghavan Venkataraghavan (Ind)
Player of the match: Anil Kumble (Ind)

- India won the toss and chose to bat.
- Nayan Mongia (Ind) made his Test debut.

=== 2nd Test ===
26–30 January 1994
Scorecard

India	v	Sri Lanka
541/6d (161 overs); Mohammed Azharuddin 108 (217); Muttiah Muralitharan 4/179 (65 overs)		231 (58.1 overs); Ruwan Kalpage 63 (99); Manoj Prabhakar 4/82 (20 overs)
		215 (55.3 overs); Hashan Tillakaratne 80 (118); Anil Kumble 3/64 (16 overs)

India won by an innings and 95 runs
M. Chinnaswamy Stadium, Bangalore
Umpires: Shyam Bansal (Ind) and K. Parthasarathy (Ind)
Player of the match: Mohammed Azharuddin (Ind)

- India won the toss and elected to bat.

=== 3rd Test ===
8–12 February 1994
Scorecard

India	v	Sri Lanka
358 (138.3 overs); Mohammed Azharuddin 152 (260); Aravinda de Silva 3/50 (23 overs)		119 (63.5 overs); Pramodya Wickramasinghe 22 (28); Venkatapathy Raju 5/38 (23.5 overs)
		222 (104.3 overs); Roshan Mahanama 63 (125); Venkatapathy Raju 6/86 (32.3 overs)

India won by an innings and 17 runs
Sardar Patel Stadium, Ahmedabad
Umpires: A. L. Narasimhan (Ind) and V. K. Ramaswamy (Ind)
Player of the match: Mohammed Azharuddin (Ind)

- Sri Lanka won the toss and chose to bat.

== ODI series ==
=== 1st ODI ===
15 February 1994
Scorecard

India; 246/5 (50 overs)	v	Sri Lanka; 238/8 (50 overs)
Navjot Singh Sidhu 108 (132); Ruwan Kalpage 1/37 (10 overs)		Aravinda de Silva 67 (85); Anil Kumble 3/43 (10 overs)

India won by 8 runs
Madhavrao Scindia Cricket Ground, Rajkot
Umpires: Jose Kurushinkal (Ind) and Piloo Reporter (Ind)
Player of the match: Navjot Singh Sidhu (Ind)

- Sri Lanka won the toss and elected to field.
- Nisal Fernando and Chaminda Vaas (SL), and Nayan Mongia (Ind) made their ODI debuts.

=== 2nd ODI ===
18 February 1994
Scorecard

Sri Lanka; 226/7 (50 overs)	v	India; 227/3 (48.2 overs)
Arjuna Ranatunga 98 (115); Manoj Prabhakar 5/35 (10 overs)		Navjot Singh Sidhu 79 (113); Muttiah Muralitharan 1/39 (10 overs)

India won by 7 wickets
Lal Bahadur Shastri Stadium, Hyderabad
Umpires: S. Choudhary (Ind) and S. K. Sharma (Ind)
Player of the match: Manoj Prabhakar (Ind)

- India won the toss and elected to field.
- Ravindra Pushpakumara and Aruna Gunawardene (SL) made their ODI debuts.

=== 3rd ODI ===
20 February 1994
Scorecard

India; 213/9 (50 overs)	v	Sri Lanka; 141/6 (32.5 overs)
Sachin Tendulkar 52 (63); Ruwan Kalpage 2/36 (10 overs)		Dulip Samaraweera 49 (65); Venkatapathy Raju 3/19 (8 overs)

Sri Lanka won by 4 wickets (Revised target)
Gandhi Stadium, Jalandhar
Umpires: K. S. Giridharan (Ind) and M. R. Singh (Ind)
Player of the match: Aravinda de Silva (SL)

- Sri Lanka won the toss and elected to field.
- Sri Lanka were set 141 runs to win in 33 overs.
