= Major Clubs Limited Over Tournament =

Sri Lanka Cricket tournament

- Countries: Sri Lanka
- Administrator: Sri Lanka Cricket
- Format: List A cricket
- First edition: 2020–21
- Latest edition: 2026
- Next edition: 2027
- Tournament format: Group stage and knockout
- Number of teams: 14
- Current champion: Moors Sports Club (1st title)
- Most successful: Tamil Union Cricket and Athletic Club (2 titles)
- Website: Official Website

The Major Clubs Limited Over Tournament is the main domestic limited overs cricket competition in Sri Lanka. It was established in 2020–21 and has existed under four different names, replacing the Premier Limited Overs Tournament, after Sri Lanka Cricket failed to approve the latter due to delays in their domestic cricket structure.

== Participating teams and format ==
The competition begins with a round-robin tournament featuring two groups of 9. The groups were organised geographically with a Group A and a Group B until 2021, since when the groups have decided by a draw.

As of 2023, the top two teams in each group progress to the knock-out stage of the competition.

== Team ==
=== Group A ===
- Burgher Recreation Club
- Colombo Cricket Club
- Colts Cricket Club
- Galle Cricket Club
- Kandy Customs Cricket Club
- Negombo Cricket Club
- Nugegoda Sports and Welfare Club
- Panadura Sports Club
- Ragama Cricket Club
- Sinhalese Sports Club
- Sri Lanka Army Sports Club

=== Group B ===
- Ace Capital Cricket Club
- Badureliya Sports Club
- Bloomfield Cricket and Athletic Club
- Chilaw Marians Cricket Club
- Kurunegala Youth Cricket Club
- Moors Sports Club
- Nondescripts Cricket Club
- Police Sports Club
- Sri Lanka Air Force Sports Club
- Sebastianites Cricket and Athletic Club
- Sri Lanka Navy Sports Club
- Tamil Union Cricket and Athletic Club

== Finals ==
Season	Final				No. of clubs
Season	Winners	Result	Runners-up	Venue	No. of clubs
2020–21	Nondescripts Cricket Club; 286/7 (50 overs)	Nondescripts won by 145 runs Scorecard	Ragama Cricket Club; 141 (30.3 overs)	Sinhalese Sports Club Cricket Ground, Colombo	26
2021–22	Tamil Union Cricket & Athletic Club; 181/9 (50 overs)	Tamil Union won by 36 runs Scorecard	Ragama Cricket Club; 145 (32.4 overs)	Paikiasothy Saravanamuttu Stadium, Colombo	26
2022–23	Tamil Union Cricket & Athletic Club; 153/3 (31.2 overs)	Tamil Union won by 7 wickets (DLS); Scorecard	Sri Lanka Army Sports Club; 198 (49.5 overs)	Sinhalese Sports Club Cricket Ground, Colombo	26
2023–24	Singhalese Sports Club; 201/8 (50 overs)	Sinhalese won by 71 runs Scorecard	Sebastianites Cricket & Athletic Club; 130 (42 overs)	Sinhalese Sports Club Cricket Ground, Colombo	22
2024	Ace Capital Cricket Club; 254/6 (49.1 overs)	Ace Capital won by 4 wickets Scorecard	Colombo Cricket Club; 251 (45.5 overs)	Sinhalese Sports Club Cricket Ground, Colombo	18
2025	Colombo Cricket Club; 387/5 (50 overs)	Colombo won by 187 runs Scorecard	Sri Lanka Police Sports Club; 200 (40.2 overs)	Colombo Cricket Club Ground, Colombo	14
2026	Moors Sports Club; 260 (49.5 overs)	Moors won by 25 runs Scorecard	Singhalese Sports Club; 235 (49.5 overs)	R. Premadasa Stadium, Colombo	14
