= Nuwan Seneviratne =

Sri Lankan cricketer

Personal information
- Full name: Batagolle Gedara Udenaka Nuwan Seneviratne
- Born: 14 November 1979; Colombo, Western Province, Sri Lanka
- Batting: Left-handed
- Bowling: Left-arm fast medium
- Role: Bowler

Domestic team information
- Years: Team
- 2004: Colombo Cricket Club

Career statistics
Competition	FC
Matches	2
Runs scored	112
Batting average	37.33
100s/50s	0/1
Top score	51
Balls bowled	144
Wickets	0
Bowling average	-
5 wickets in innings	0
10 wickets in match	0
Best bowling	-
Catches/stumpings	0/0
- Source: ESPNcricinfo

Batagolle Gedara Udenaka Nuwan Seneviratne also known as Nuwan Seneviratne (born 14 November 1979) is a former Sri Lankan first-class cricketer and coach. He currently works as a throwdown specialist coach for India men's national cricket team.

He has played two first-class matches in his career. His two first-class appearances were for Colombo Cricket Club as his both first-class appearances came in the 2004 Major Premier League competition.

== Career ==
He made his first-class debut on 16 January 2004 for Colombo Cricket Club against Moors Sports Club during the 2004 Major Premier League season. He scored half-century on his first-class debut in his very first innings after coming into bat at number three.

He was roped in as an assistant fielding coach by Sri Lanka Cricket with the recommendation of former Sri Lankan player Roy Dias. He was drafted into Sri Lankan coaching setup and had worked with Sri Lanka Cricket for nearly a decade. He also had coaching gigs with few other domestic teams and also served as the assistant coach of Kandy side in the 2018 Sri Lankan Super Provincial 50-over tournament.

He was roped in as a throwdown specialist by BCCI prior to the 2018 Asia Cup in order to help counter the challenge of left arm fast bowlers which was a major underlying concern for the top order batsmen of Indian national cricket team over the years especially with the likes of mainstay batsmen Rohit Sharma and Virat Kohli whose weaknesses had been exposed by the inswing of left arm seamers at international cricket. Later, it was revealed it was the then Indian captain Virat Kohli's idea to bring in someone like Nuwan Seneviratne in the Indian coaching staff after watching him closely during India's bilateral overseas series in Sri Lanka in 2017. Kohli was impressed by Nuwan's work ethics after spotting his talent. The move eventually worked wonders as India clinched the 2018 Asia Cup title and notably India negotiated the left arm threat during their group stage contest against archrivals India where India secured a thumping ten wicket victory. Both Rohit Sharma and Shikhar Dhawan managed to safely negotiate the inswing of left arm seamers including Shaheen Afridi during the contest.

Following his successful stint with Indian men's national team following their triumph at the Asia Cup in 2018, he was retained by the think-tank and Indian team management for the next assignment crucially the India's test tour in 2018 to Australia which is popularly known as Border–Gavaskar Trophy. He was initially contracted for a period of one year up until the end of the 2019 Cricket World Cup. However, he continued to remain with the Indian coaching support staff and was given a long rope by BCCI for an indefinite period of time.
