= Asitha =

Asitha is a given name. Notable people with the name include:

- Asitha Ameresekere (born 1971), British-Sri Lankan filmmaker
- Asitha Costa (born 1970), Sri Lankan cricketer
- Asitha Fernando (born 1997), Sri Lankan cricketer
- Asitha Rathnaweera, Sri Lankan cricketer
