= Indian cricket team in Australia in 2024–25 =

International cricket tour

| | Australia | India |
- Dates: 22 November 2024 – 5 January 2025
| Captains | Pat Cummins | Rohit Sharma (Note: Jasprit Bumrah captained India for 1st and 5th Test matches.) |

Test series
- Result: Australia won the 5-match series 3–1
| Most runs | Travis Head (448) | Yashasvi Jaiswal (391) |
| Most wickets | Pat Cummins (25) | Jasprit Bumrah (32) |
- Player of the series: Jasprit Bumrah (Ind)

The Indian cricket team toured Australia from November 2024 to January 2025 to play five Test matches and three first-class warm-up matches against the Australian cricket team. The Test matches formed part of the 2023–2025 ICC World Test Championship. In March 2024, the Cricket Australia (CA) announced the venues for the Test series. It was the first Test series between India and Australia comprising five matches since 1992. On 26 March 2024, the CA confirmed the full tour itinerary.

India had retained the Border–Gavaskar Trophy after defeating Australia 2–1 in the previous series in 2023. However, this time Australia won the series by 3–1 to win the trophy for the first time since 2014-15.

This was also the last Test series of Ravichandran Ashwin, Rohit Sharma and Virat Kohli before their Test retirements.

== Venues ==
Cricket Australia announced their summer cricket schedule in March 2024. The series was played at the main cricket grounds in Australia's five largest cities. It was the first five-match test series to be played between the two nations since India's tour of Australia in 1991/92.

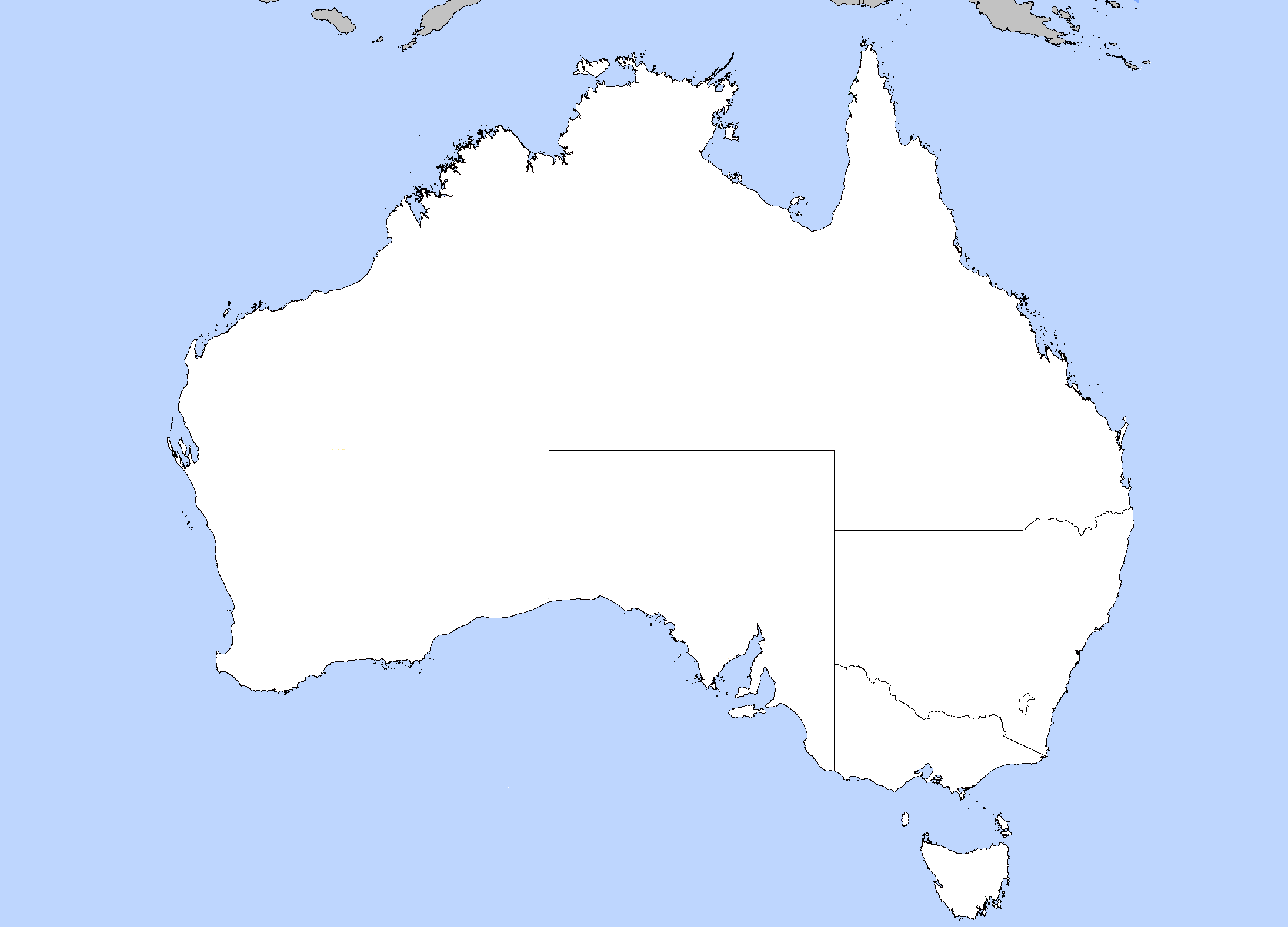

| Test | Location | Stadium | Capacity | Date |
|---|---|---|---|---|
| 1st | Perth | Perth Stadium | 61,266 | 22–26 November |
| 2nd | Adelaide | Adelaide Oval | 53,500 | 6–10 December |
| 3rd | Brisbane | The Gabba | 37,000 | 14–18 December |
| 4th | Melbourne | Melbourne Cricket Ground | 100,024 | 26–30 December |
| 5th | Sydney | Sydney Cricket Ground | 48,000 | 3–7 January |

== Squads ==
| Australia | India |
|---|---|
| Pat Cummins (c); Travis Head (vc); Steve Smith (vc); Sean Abbott; Scott Boland; Alex Carey (wk); Brendan Doggett; Josh Hazlewood; ~~Josh Inglis~~ (wk); Usman Khawaja; Sam Konstas; Marnus Labuschagne; Nathan Lyon; Mitchell Marsh; Nathan McSweeney; Jhye Richardson; Mitchell Starc; Beau Webster | Rohit Sharma (c); Jasprit Bumrah (vc); Virat Kohli (vc); Ravichandran Ashwin; Akash Deep; Abhimanyu Easwaran; Shubman Gill; Ravindra Jadeja; Yashasvi Jaiswal; Rishabh Pant (wk); Sarfaraz Khan; Tanush Kotian; Prasidh Krishna; Dhruv Jurel (wk); Devdutt Padikkal; KL Rahul (wk); Harshit Rana; Nitish Kumar Reddy; Mohammed Siraj; Washington Sundar |

India named an 18-member squad for the test series along with Mukesh Kumar, Navdeep Saini and Khaleel Ahmed as travelling reserves.

On 17 November, Shubman Gill was ruled out of the first Test with a fractured thumb of his left hand, during the intra-squad training match at the WACA. On 20 November, Devdutt Padikkal, who was a part of the India A squad and was asked to stay back as cover with a few injury scares due to several batsmen getting blows during the practice match with India A, was added to the main squad. Additionally, Yash Dayal was added to the list of travelling reserves as a replacement for the injured Khaleel Ahmed.

On 27 November, Beau Webster was added to the Australian squad as cover for the possible unavailability of Mitchell Marsh due to injury. On 30 November, Sean Abbott and Brendan Doggett were added into the Australian squad for the second Test as injury replacement for Josh Hazlewood who was ruled out due to side strain.

On 17 December, Josh Hazlewood was ruled out of the rest of the series after he suffered a calf strain on the fourth day of the 3rd Test.

On 18 December, following the 3rd Test, Ravichandran Ashwin announced his retirement from international cricket. On 23 December, Tanush Kotian was added into the squad.

On 20 December, Nathan McSweeney was dropped from the squad for the last two Tests with Jhye Richardson and Sam Konstas added to the squad.

On 29 December, Josh Inglis was ruled out from the squad for the last Test due to calf strain.

== Tour matches ==
India A Tour of Australia 2024
- Part of India Tour of Australia 2024–25
- Date: 31 October 2024 – 10 November 2024
- Location: Australia
- Result: Australia A won the series 2–0
Teams
- Australia A: India A
Captains
- Nathan McSweeney: Ruturaj Gaikwad
Most runs
- Nathan McSweeney (166) Beau Webster (145): Devdutt Padikkal (151); Dhruv Jurel (148)
Most wickets
- Brendan Doggett (7) Beau Webster (7): Mukesh Kumar (11); Prasidh Krishna (10)

=== Squads ===
| Australia A | India A |
|---|---|
| Nathan McSweeney (c); Cameron Bancroft; Jordan Buckingham; Scott Boland; Cooper Connolly; Ollie Davies; Brendan Doggett; Marcus Harris; ~~Liam Hatcher~~; Sam Konstas; Nathan McAndrew; Todd Murphy; Michael Neser; Fergus O'Neill; Jimmy Peirson (wk); Josh Philippe (wk); Corey Rocchiccioli; ~~Mark Steketee~~; Beau Webster | Ruturaj Gaikwad (c); Abhimanyu Easwaran (vc); Ricky Bhui; Dhruv Jurel (wk); Baba Indrajith; Devdutt Padikkal; KL Rahul (wk); Sai Sudharsan; Tanush Kotian; Nitish Kumar Reddy; Manav Suthar; Ishan Kishan (wk); Abhishek Porel (wk); Khaleel Ahmed; Yash Dayal; Mukesh Kumar; Navdeep Saini; Prasidh Krishna |

The tour was kickstarted by India A touring Australia from 31 October to 10 November, ending just 5 days before the official Test series starts. Cricket Australia announced their Australia A squad in early October 2024, naming Nathan McSweeney as their captain. Board of Control for Cricket in India announced India A cricket team's squad in October 2024, naming Ruturaj Gaikwad as the side's captain along with Abhimanyu Easwaran as the vice-captain.

India 'A' played two games against Australia 'A'. The first of those matches was played at the Great Barrier Reef Arena from 31 October to 3 November while the second was played at the Melbourne Cricket Ground from 7 to 10 November. The first Test was played at the new Perth Stadium from 22 November.

While announcing the international schedule, Peter Roach, CA's head of Cricket Operations and Scheduling, had said in May: "The 2024–25 summer is highlighted by the five-Test Border–Gavaskar series, the first five-Test series between the two giants in more than 30 years. To have that running simultaneously with the women's ODIs and preceded by two significant Australia A v India A matches will be terrific for our fans."

Prior to the start of the series, Mark Steketee and his replacement Liam Hatcher were both ruled out due to injury and were replaced by Brendan Doggett. On 3 November 2024, KL Rahul and Dhruv Jurel were added to the squad for the second unofficial Test.

=== 1st unofficial Test ===
31 October – 3 November 2024
Scorecard

| India A | v | Australia A |
| 107 (47.4 overs); Devdutt Padikkal 36 (77); Brendan Doggett 6/15 (11 overs) | | 195 (62.4 overs); Nathan McSweeney 39 (131); Mukesh Kumar 6/46 (18.4 overs) |
| 312 (100 overs); Sai Sudharsan 103 (200); Fergus O'Neill 4/55 (24 overs) | | 3/226 (75 overs); Nathan McSweeney 88* (178); Prasidh Krishna 1/27 (13 overs) |

Australia A won by 7 wickets
Great Barrier Reef Arena, Mackay
Umpires: Shawn Craig (Aus) and Ben Treloar (Aus)

- Australia A won the toss and elected to field.

On the day 4 of the match, Indian wicketkeeper Ishan Kishan and the on-field umpire Shawn Craig could be heard on stump-mic arguing about the condition of the ball as the umpires thought that the ball has been scratched intentionally, putting allegations upon the Indian cricket team for ball tampering, to which the Indian cricket team including the captain Ruturaj Gaikwad and wicketkeeper Ishan Kishan opposed and argued over as they had been maintaining the ball to generate reverse swing in their attempt to make a comeback in the game.

=== 2nd unofficial Test ===
7–10 November 2024
Scorecard

| India A | v | Australia A |
| 161 (57.1 overs); Dhruv Jurel 80 (186); Michael Neser 4/27 (12.2 overs) | | 223 (62.1 overs); Marcus Harris 74 (128); Prasidh Krishna 4/50 (16 overs) |
| 229 (77.5 overs); Dhruv Jurel 68 (122); Corey Rocchiccioli 4/74 (23.5 overs) | | 4/169 (47.5 overs); Sam Konstas 73* (128); Prasidh Krishna 2/37 (12 overs) |

Australia A won by 6 wickets
Melbourne Cricket Ground, Melbourne
Umpires: Gerard Abood (Aus) and Michael Graham-Smith (Aus)

- Australia A won the toss and elected to field.

=== India vs India A ===
15–17 November 2024

| India | v | India A |

Match Cancelled
WACA Ground, Perth

- Intrasquad match, which was called off by the BCCI.

=== Prime Minister's XI vs Indians ===
30 November–1 December 2024
Scorecard

| Prime Minister's XI | v | Indians |
| 240 (43.2 overs); Sam Konstas 107 (97); Harshit Rana 4/44 (6 overs) | | 5/257 (46 overs); Shubman Gill 50 (62); Charlie Anderson 2/30 (6 overs) |

Indians won by 6 wickets
Manuka Oval, Canberra
Umpires: Simon Lightbody (Aus) and Sharad Patel (Aus)
Player of the match: Sam Konstas (PM XI)

- Indians won the toss and elected to field.
- No play was possible on Day 1 due to rain. After this, the match was rescheduled as a 50-over contest for the second day, which was later reduced to 46 overs per side due to rain.
- Target achieved at 42.5 overs, 4/241

== Test series ==
=== 1st Test ===
22–25 November 2024
Scorecard

| India | v | Australia |
| 150 (49.4 overs); Nitish Kumar Reddy 41 (59); Josh Hazlewood 4/29 (13 overs) | | 104 (51.2 overs); Mitchell Starc 29 (112); Jasprit Bumrah 5/30 (18 overs) |
| 6/487d (134.3 overs); Yashasvi Jaiswal 161 (297); Nathan Lyon 2/96 (39 overs) | | 238 (58.4 overs); Travis Head 89 (101); Jasprit Bumrah 3/42 (12 overs) |

India won by 295 runs
Perth Stadium, Perth
Umpires: Chris Gaffaney (NZ) and Richard Kettleborough (Eng)
Player of the match: Jasprit Bumrah (Ind)

- India won the toss and elected to bat.
- Nathan McSweeney (Aus), Harshit Rana and Nitish Kumar Reddy (Ind) all made their Test debuts.
- KL Rahul (Ind) scored his 3,000th run in Tests.
- Virat Kohli scored his 7th Test century in Australia, breaking Sachin Tendulkar's record of most Test centuries for India in Australia.
- This was Australia's first loss in a Test match at the Perth Stadium and India became the first visiting team to win a Test match at the ground.
- This was India's biggest victory in terms of runs in Australia.
- World Test Championship points: India 12, Australia 0.

=== 2nd Test ===
6–8 December 2024 (D/N)
Scorecard

| India | v | Australia |
| 180 (44.1 overs); Nitish Kumar Reddy 42 (54); Mitchell Starc 6/48 (14.1 overs) | | 337 (87.3 overs); Travis Head 140 (141); Jasprit Bumrah 4/61 (23 overs) |
| 175 (36.5 overs); Nitish Kumar Reddy 42 (47); Pat Cummins 5/57 (14 overs) | | 0/19 (3.2 overs); Nathan McSweeney 10* (12) |

Australia won by 10 wickets
Adelaide Oval, Adelaide
Umpires: Chris Gaffaney (NZ) and Richard Illingworth (Eng)
Player of the match: Travis Head (Aus)

- India won the toss and elected to bat.
- Travis Head (Aus) scored a century off 111 balls, the fastest in day-night Tests.
- Ravichandran Ashwin (Ind) played in his last Test match.
- World Test Championship points: Australia 12, India 0.

=== 3rd Test ===
14–18 December 2024
Scorecard

| Australia | v | India |
| 445 (117.1 overs); Travis Head 152 (160); Jasprit Bumrah 6/76 (28 overs) | | 260 (78.5 overs); KL Rahul 84 (139); Pat Cummins 4/81 (22 overs) |
| 7/89d (18 overs); Pat Cummins 22 (10); Jasprit Bumrah 3/18 (6 overs) | | 0/8 (2.1 overs); Yashasvi Jaiswal 4* (6) |

Match drawn
The Gabba, Brisbane
Umpires: Richard Illingworth (Eng) and Richard Kettleborough (Eng)
Player of the match: Travis Head (Aus)

- India won the toss and elected to field.
- Only 13.2 overs of play was possible on Day 1, 33.1 overs of play was possible on Day 3, and 24.1 overs of play on Day 5 was possible due to rain.
- Virat Kohli (Ind) played in his 100th international match against Australia.
- Jasprit Bumrah took his 52nd Test wicket in Australia, breaking Kapil Dev's record of most Test wickets taken for India in Australia.
- World Test Championship points: Australia 4, India 4.

=== 4th Test ===
26–30 December 2024
Scorecard

| Australia | v | India |
| 474 (122.4 overs); Steve Smith 140 (197); Jasprit Bumrah 4/99 (28.4 overs) | | 369 (119.3 overs); Nitish Kumar Reddy 114 (189); Scott Boland 3/57 (27 overs) |
| 234 (83.4 overs); Marnus Labuschagne 70 (139); Jasprit Bumrah 5/57 (24.4 overs) | | 155 (79.1 overs); Yashasvi Jaiswal 84 (208); Pat Cummins 3/28 (18 overs) |

Australia won by 184 runs
Melbourne Cricket Ground, Melbourne
Umpires: Michael Gough (Eng) and Joel Wilson (WI)
Player of the match: Pat Cummins (Aus)

- Australia won the toss and elected to bat.
- Sam Konstas (Aus) made his Test debut. His fifty off 52 deliveries was the third fastest by an Australian on debut.
- Nitish Kumar Reddy (Ind) scored his maiden century in Tests. He made the highest score for a batsman batting at 8 or lower at the MCG.
- Jasprit Bumrah (Ind) took his 200th wicket in Tests.
- The all-time attendance record for a Test match in Australia was broken (1st day 87,242, 2nd day 85,147, 3rd day 83,073, 4th day 43,867 and 5th day 74,362).
- Rohit Sharma (Ind) played in his last Test match.
- World Test Championship points: Australia 12, India 0.

=== 5th Test ===
3–5 January 2025
Scorecard

| India | v | Australia |
| 185 (72.2 overs); Rishabh Pant 40 (98); Scott Boland 4/31 (20 overs) | | 181 (51 overs); Beau Webster 57 (105); Prasidh Krishna 3/42 (15 overs) |
| 157 (39.5 overs); Rishabh Pant 61 (33); Scott Boland 6/45 (16.5 overs) | | 4/162 (27 overs); Usman Khawaja 41 (45); Prasidh Krishna 3/65 (12 overs) |

Australia won by 6 wickets
Sydney Cricket Ground, Sydney
Umpires: Michael Gough (Eng) and Sharfuddoula (Ban)
Player of the match: Scott Boland (Aus)

- India won the toss and elected to bat.
- Beau Webster (Aus) made his Test debut.
- Shubman Gill (Ind) played in his 100th international match.
- Scott Boland (Aus) took his 50th wicket in Tests. He took his first ten-wicket haul in Tests.
- Pat Cummins (Aus) took his 500th wicket in international cricket.
- Jasprit Bumrah (Ind) took his 32nd Test wicket in the series thus, breaking Bishan Singh Bedi's record of most Test wickets taken by an Indian in an away series.
- On Day 2 and Day 3, Virat Kohli (Ind) became the stand-in captain while Jasprit Bumrah (Ind) was off the field due to back spasms.
- Mohammed Siraj (Ind) took his 100th wicket in Tests.
- Virat Kohli (Ind) played in his last Test match.
- Australia qualified for the 2025 ICC World Test Championship final.
- World Test Championship points: Australia 12, India 0.
