= Abeysekera =

Abeysekera අබේසේකර
- Pronunciation: Abēsēkara
- Language: Sinhala

Origin
- Region of origin: Sri Lanka

Other names
- Alternative spelling: Abeysekara

Abeysekera or Abeysekara (Sinhala: අබේසේකර, romanized: Abēsēkara) is a Sinhalese surname.

== Notable people ==
- Amila Abeysekara (born 1983), Sri Lankan actor
- Atula Abeysekera, Enterprise Risk Management Expert and a British Academic
- Chitrananda Abeysekera (1930–1992), Sri Lankan radio personality
- Hiran Abeysekera (born 1986), Sri Lankan actor
- Ishan Abeysekara (born 1993), Sri Lankan cricketer
- Karunaratne Abeysekera (1930–1983), Sri Lankan radio personality, poet and songwriter
- Manel Abeysekera (born 1933), Sri Lankan diplomat
- Milan Abeysekera (born 1993), Sri Lankan cricketer
- Percy Abeysekera, Sri Lanka cricket superfan
- Piyal Abeysekera, Sri Lankan army officer
- Shani Abeysekara, Sri Lankan police officer
- Shantha Abeysekara, Sri Lankan politician
- Sunila Abeysekera (1952–2013), Sri Lankan activist
- Suraj Abeysekera (born 1958), Sri Lankan cricketer
- Tissa Abeysekara (1939–2009), Sri Lankan film-maker
- Vernon Abeysekera, Sri Lankan civil servant
