= Adikaram =

Adikaram is a Sinhalese surname. Notable people with the surname include:

- E. W. Adikaram (1905–1985), Sri Lankan educationalist
- Naresh Adikaram (born 1970), Sri Lankan cricketer
