= Keshara Nuwantha =

Sri Lankan cricketer (born 1999)

Personal information
- Full name: Withanawasam Keshara Nuwantha
- Born: 21 October 2000 (age 26); Matara, Sri Lanka
- Batting: Right-handed
- Bowling: Right-arm Offbreak
- Role: Allrounder

International information
- National side: Sri Lanka (2026–present)
- Test debut (cap 172): 15 August 2026 v India
- Last Test: 23 August 2026 v India

Domestic team information
- Years: Team
- 2022–2022: PSC
- 2022–2025: CMC
- 2025–Present: BSC
- 2026–Present: Galle

Career statistics
Competition	FC	LA	T20
Matches	17	15	6
Runs scored	1,831	414	164
Batting average	13.66	12.27	19.40
100s/50s	0/0	0/0	0/1
Top score	46	35*	57
Balls bowled	3,096	477	102
Wickets	70	16	8
Bowling average	26.15	25.87	20.50
5 wickets in innings	5	0	0
10 wickets in match	1	0	0
Best bowling	7/71	4/16	4/41
Catches/stumpings	5/0	6/0	4/0
- Source: ESPNcricinfo, 13 August 2024

Keshara Nuwantha (Sinhala: කේෂර නුවන්‍ත, [Kay-shuh-ruh Noo-wun-thuh] (Note: [ⁿd̪] is a Prenasalized consonant.), born 21 October 2000) is a Sri Lankan cricketer. He made his first-class debut for Panadura Sports Club in the National Super League 4-Day Tournament on 19 August 2022. He made his Twenty20 debut on 25 May 2025, for Badureliya Sports Club in the 2025 Major Clubs T20. He made his List A debut on June 27 2022, for Chilaw Marians Cricket Club in the 2022–23 Major Clubs Limited Over Tournament.

In August 2026, Nuwantha was selected in Sri Lanka's test squad against India. He debuted debuted in the first test in Galle.
