= Peter Roach =

Peter Roach may refer to:

- Peter Roach (cricketer) (born 1975), Australian cricketer
- Peter Roach (phonetician) (born 1943), British phonologist (Emeritus Professor of Phonetics at Reading University)
