= Samantha Dodanwela =

Sri Lankan cricketer and businessman

Personal information
- Full name: Samantha Bandara Dodanwela
- Born: 15 September 1970 (age 56); Kandy, Sri Lanka
- Batting: Right-handed
- Bowling: Right-arm medium
- Role: Bowler

Domestic team information
- Years: Team
- 1993-94 to 1996-97: Sinhalese Sports Club

Career statistics
Competition	FC	LA
Matches	28	2
Runs scored	133	–
Batting average	10.23	–
100s/50s	0/0	–
Top score	22	–
Balls bowled	3367	72
Wickets	103	1
Bowling average	16.83	39.00
5 wickets in innings	5	0
10 wickets in match	1	n/a
Best bowling	6/44	1/28
Catches/stumpings	7/–	0/–
- Source: Cricinfo, 30 March 2019

Samantha Dodanwela (born 15 September 1970) is a Sri Lankan former first-class cricketer who played for the Sinhalese Sports Club.

Dodanwela was a right-arm opening bowler. His best season was in 1995-96, when he took 57 wickets at an average of 13.96, including his best figures of 4 for 33 and 6 for 44 against Tamil Union.

He was later the chairman of Sinhalese Sports Club, and served on some Sri Lanka Cricket committees. He is a tea taster by profession and is the chief executive officer of Mercantile Produce Brokers (Pvt.) Ltd., a tea brokerage company. He serves on the executive committee of the Colombo Tea Traders' Association and on the tea tasting panel of the Sri Lanka Tea Board.
