= Rajnesh Wellington =

Sri Lankan cricketer (born 1968)

Rajnesh Wellington (born Jude Plascidus Rajnesh Wellington on 5 October 1968) was a Sri Lankan cricketer. He was a right-handed batsman and a right-arm off-break bowler who played for the Tamil Union Cricket and Athletic Club. He was born in Watara.

Wellington made a single first-class appearance for the side, during the 1988–89 season, against Galle Cricket Club. From the lower order, he scored 16 runs in the only innings in which he batted.
