= Sanka Abeyruwan =

Sri Lankan cricketer (born 1992)

Sanka Abeyruwan (full name Sanka Ramesh Abeyruwan; born 29 October 1992) is a current Sri Lankan cricketer. He was born in Colombo and currently living in Melbourne Australia. He has played for the Sinhalese Sports Club and the Colts Cricket Club in the domestic game in Sri Lanka and Southern Rangers Cricket Club, Haig Fawkner Cricket Club and Hoppers Crossing Cricket Club in Melbourne. He is a first-class bowler in 22 matches from the 2012–13 season and has taken 24 wickets. He bowls leg break and is a right-handed batsman. His best bowling to date is 5–24 and his highest score is 28 runs.

Abeyruwan made his first-class debut in February 2013 when he played for the Sinhalese in the 2012–13 Premier Trophy against the Badureliya Sports Club. His latest match played in Sri Lanka was in March 2016 in the 2015–16 AIA Premier League Tournament for the Colts against the Moors Sports Club. His total played matches in Australia (up-to now) 97 matches, 2280 runs, 27.47 batting average and 130 wickets with an average of 21.10. Highest Score 88 and best bowling stat recorded was 5/16.
