= Gayan Sheromal =

Sri Lankan cricketer (born 1969)

Gayan Sheromal (born 16 November 1969) was a Sri Lankan cricketer. He was a right-handed batsman and wicket-keeper who played for Moors Sports Club. He was born in Colombo.

Sheromal made a single first-class appearance for the side, during the 1991–92 season, against Colts Cricket Club. He failed to score a run in either innings in which he batted.
