= Ushan Manohara =

Sri Lankan cricketer (born 1989)

Ushan Manohara (full name Petta Yaddehi Ushan Manohara; born 26 August 1989) is a Sri Lankan cricketer. He is a right-handed batsman and right-arm medium-fast bowler who plays for Sinhalese Sports Club. He was born in Galle.

Manohara, who made his debut for Sinhalese Sports Club Under-23s during 2009, made his List A debut during the Premier Limited Overs Tournament competition of 2009–10, debuting against Colombo Cricket Club, taking a single wicket, that of fellow debutante Dilesh Gunaratne, for a second-ball duck.

Manohara made his first-class debut during the 2009-10 Premier Championship, against Sinhalese Sports Club, though he did not bat in the match, as two days were washed out.
