= 2023–24 Major Clubs Limited Over Tournament =

Cricket tournament

- Dates: 13 December 2023 – 16 January 2024
- Administrator: Sri Lanka Cricket
- Cricket format: List A cricket
- Tournament format: Round-robin then knockout
- Host: Sri Lanka
- Champions: Sinhalese Sports Club (1st title)
- Participants: 22
- Matches: 113
- Most runs: Krishan Sanjula (518)
- Most wickets: Prabath Jayasuriya (23)

The 2023–24 Major Clubs Limited Over Tournament is the 4th edition of the Major Clubs Limited Over Tournament, a List A cricket competition in Sri Lanka. The tournament began on 13 December 2023 and the final was held on 16 January 2024. Tamil Union were the defending champions. Sinhalese Sports Club defeated Sebastianites in the final.

== Knockout stage ==
Semi-finals
A1 | Sebastianites | 112/0 (22.3)
B2 | Badureliya | 108 (42.2)
B1 | Sinhalese Sports Club | 240/4 (47)
A2 | Colts Cricket Club | 236/8 (50)

Final
SF1 | Sebastianites | 130 (42)
SF2 | Sinhalese Sports Club | 201/8 (50)

=== Semi-finals ===
==== Semi-final 1 ====
13 January 2024
09:45
Scorecard

| Badureliya; 108 (42.2 overs) | v | Sebastianites; 112/0 (22.3 overs) |
| Rohan Sanjaya 27 (50 overs); Isitha Wijesundara 2/22 (8 overs) | | Thulina Dilshan 53* (65); Sebastianites won by 10 wickets |

Nondescripts Cricket Club Ground, Colombo
Umpires: Chandrika Amarasinghe and Gamini Dissanayake

- Sebastianites won the toss and elected to field.

==== Semi-final 2 ====
14 January 2024
09:45
Scorecard

| Colts Cricket Club; 236/8 (50 overs) | v | Sinhalese Sports Club; 240/4 (47 overs) |
| Hashan Dumindu 63 (96); Prabath Jayasuriya 2/24 (10 overs) | | Avishka Fernando 125* (138); Muditha Lakshan 1/40 (10 overs) |

Sinhalese Sports Club won by 6 wickets
Nondescripts Cricket Club Ground, Colombo
Umpires: Shantha Fonseka and Ranmore Martinesz

- Sinhalese Sports Club won the toss and elected to field.

=== Final ===
16 January 2024
09:45
Scorecard

| Sinhalese Sports Club; 201/8 (50 overs) | v | Sebastianites; 130 (42 overs) |
| Krishan Sanjula 84 (125); Dushan Vimukthi 2/39 (10 overs) | | Chamikara Edirisinghe 37 (76); Prabath Jayasuriya 3/25 (8 overs) |

Sinhalese Sports Club won by 71 runs
Sinhalese Sports Club Ground, Colombo
Umpires: Ravindra Kottahachchi and Chamara de Soysa

- Sinhalese Sports Club won the toss and electes to field.
- Gishan Balasooriya (Sinhalese Sports Club) made his List A debut.
