= Nandika Ranjith =

Sri Lankan cricketer (born 1972)

Paragodagamage Nandika Ranjith (born 6 December 1972, in Colombo, Sri Lanka), is a cricketer who has represented the Sri Lanka 'A' team. He has played for several first-class and List A cricket teams in Sri Lanka, particularly for Moors Sports Club.

A left arm fast bowler, he took 69 wickets at 17.10 in 2002–03 to help Moors Sports Club win the Premier League Trophy. He made his Twenty20 debut on 17 August 2004, for Tamil Union Cricket and Athletic Club in the 2004 SLC Twenty20 Tournament.

In 2006 he played for Tickhill CC in the South Yorkshire League of England. In his first season at Tickhill he helped the club lift the Mick Savage Cup & reach the final of the Rotherham Evening League Cup. Spent most of 2008 playing in the Northumberland and Tyneside Senior league for Shotley Bridge CC.He helped them to finish 2nd in the league as well as winning the league cup with a 6 off the 5th ball of the last over.
