= Nisal =

Nisal is a masculine given name. Notable people with the name include:

- Nisal Fernando (born 1970), Sri Lankan cricketer
- Nisal Francisco (born 1997), Sri Lankan cricketer
- Nisal Randika (born 1982), Sri Lankan cricketer
