= Indian cricket team in Sri Lanka in 2026 =

International cricket tour

	Sri Lanka	India
- Dates: 15 August – 27 August 2026
Captains	Dhananjaya de Silva	Shubman Gill

Test series
- Result: India won the 2-match series 1–0
Most runs	Sonal Dinusha (420)	Devdutt Padikkal (328)
Most wickets	Asitha Fernando (10)	Manav Suthar (16)
- Player of the series: Devdutt Padikkal (Ind)

The Indian cricket team toured Sri Lanka in August 2026 to play two Test matches against the Sri Lanka cricket team. In July 2026, Sri Lanka Cricket (SLC) confirmed the fixtures for the tour. The Test series formed part of the 2025–2027 ICC World Test Championship.

== Squads ==
Sri Lanka	India
Dhananjaya de Silva (c); Kamindu Mendis (vc); Sahan Arachchige; Dinesh Chandimal (wk); Niroshan Dickwella (wk); Sonal Dinusha; Asitha Fernando; Vishwa Fernando; Prabath Jayasuriya; Lahiru Kumara; Dilshan Madushanka; Nishan Madushka; Ramesh Mendis; Kamil Mishara; Keshara Nuwantha; Milan Rathnayake; Pasindu Sooriyabandara; Lahiru Udara (wk)	Shubman Gill (c); KL Rahul (vc); Gurnoor Brar; ~~Jasprit Bumrah~~; Ravindra Jadeja; Saransh Jain; Yashasvi Jaiswal; Dhruv Jurel (wk); Sarfaraz Khan; Prasidh Krishna; Auqib Nabi; Devdutt Padikkal; Rishabh Pant (wk); Mohammed Siraj; ~~Sai Sudharsan~~; Manav Suthar; Washington Sundar; Kuldeep Yadav

On 3 August, Jasprit Bumrah was ruled out of the series due to a knee injury and was replaced by Auqib Nabi. On 9 August, Sai Sudharsan was ruled out of the series due to a toe injury and was replaced by Sarfaraz Khan.

On 21 August, Sahan Arachchige and Kamil Mishara were added to Sri Lanka's test team ahead of the second test with Dinesh Chandimal ruled out due to concussion and Nishan Madushka, Ramesh Mendis and Dilshan Madushanka dropped.

== Tour match ==
Three-day match : Sri Lanka Cricket XI vs India

The Indian team played a three-day match against the Sri Lanka XI team.

7–9 August 2026
Scorecard

Sri Lanka Cricket XI	v	India
363/8d (90 overs); Ravindu Rasantha 71 (143); Manav Suthar 2/33 (13 overs)		357/7d (90 overs); Devdutt Padikkal 142* (164); Asanka Manoj 2/32 (18 overs)
200/6d (45 overs); Nishan Fernando 63* (73); Ravindra Jadeja 2/33 (7 overs)		214/4 (45 overs); Yashasvi Jaiswal 61* (46); Keshara Nuwantha 2/57 (10 overs)

India won by 6 wickets
Nondescripts Cricket Club Ground, Colombo
Umpires: Chandrika Amarasinghe (SL) and Prageeth Rambukwella (SL)

- Sri Lanka Cricket XI won the toss and elected to bat.
- India achieved the target of 207 runs in 44.3 overs.

== Test series ==
=== 1st Test ===
15–19 August 2026
Scorecard

India	v	Sri Lanka
462 (116.4 overs); Devdutt Padikkal 167 (230); Prabath Jayasuriya 4/109 (39 overs)		284 (79.4 overs); Sonal Dinusha 100 (168); Manav Suthar 4/76 (21.4 overs)
193 (48.5 overs); Rishabh Pant 66 (69); Asitha Fernando 4/31 (8.5 overs)		206 (77.4 overs); Sonal Dinusha 84 (128); Manav Suthar 6/55 (23.4 overs)

India won by 165 runs
Galle International Stadium, Galle
Umpires: Rod Tucker (Aus) (Note: Raveendra Wimalasiri replaced him on 94.1 over on Day 2 due to health issues. Then, Ahsan Raza (Pak) took over the on-field umpiring duties on Day 3.) and Sharfuddoula (Ban)
Player of the match: Devdutt Padikkal (Ind)

- India won the toss and elected to bat.
- Keshara Nuwantha (SL) made his Test debut.
- This was India's 600th Test match.
- This venue became the first Asian cricket stadium to host 50 Test matches.
- Devdutt Padikkal (Ind) scored his maiden century in Tests.
- Ravindra Jadeja (Ind) took his 350th wicket in Tests.
- Sonal Dinusha (SL) scored his maiden century in Tests.
- Rishabh Pant (Ind) hit his 100th six in Tests, becoming the fastest to do so in terms of number of innings (89).
- Pasindu Sooriyabandara (SL) replaced Dinesh Chandimal as a concussion substitute during the fourth innings of the match and made his Test debut.
- Manav Suthar (Ind) took his maiden ten-wicket haul in Tests.
- World Test Championship points: India 12, Sri Lanka 0.

=== 2nd Test ===
23–27 August 2026
Scorecard

India	v	Sri Lanka
503/9d (138 overs); Devdutt Padikkal 117 (193); Asitha Fernando 4/106 (29 overs)		290 (89.4 overs); Sonal Dinusha 103 (162); Prasidh Krishna 3/52 (16 overs)
		429/9d (154 overs) (f/o); Sonal Dinusha 133* (264); Ravindra Jadeja 3/94 (38.3 overs)

Match drawn
SSC Cricket Ground, Colombo
Umpires: Ahsan Raza (Pak) and Sharfuddoula (Ban)
Player of the match: Sonal Dinusha (SL)

- India won the toss and elected to bat.
- Kamil Mishara (SL) and Saransh Jain (Ind) both made their Test debuts.
- Shubman Gill (Ind) scored his 3,000th run in Tests.
- World Test Championship points: India 4, Sri Lanka 4.
