= Dulip Samaraweera =

Sri Lankan cricketer

Personal information
- Full name: Dulip Prasanna Samaraweera
- Born: 12 February 1972 (age 54)
- Batting: Right-handed
- Bowling: Right-arm offbreak

International information
- National side: Sri Lanka (1993–1995)
- Test debut (cap 60): 8 December 1993 v West Indies
- Last Test: 18 March 1995 v New Zealand
- ODI debut (cap 73): 3 November 1993 v West Indies
- Last ODI: 20 February 1994 v India

Career statistics
Competition	Test	ODI
Matches	7	5
Runs scored	211	91
Batting average	15.07	22.75
100s/50s	0/0	0/0
Top score	42	49
Catches/stumpings	5/–	3/–
- Source: Cricinfo, 4 July 2016

Dulip Prasanna Samaraweera (born 12 February 1972) is a former Sri Lankan cricketer who played in seven Test matches and five One Day Internationals for his country from 1993 to 1995. He was a right-handed opening batsmen and occasional right arm off-spinner.

== Family ==
His younger brother Thilan Samaraweera is also a former Test, ODI and T20I player of the Sri Lankan national cricket team.

His brother in law Bathiya Perera is also a former first class cricketer of Sri Lanka.

== Domestic career ==
Playing for the Colts Cricket Club in Sri Lanka, Samaraweera made his first class debut in the 1991-92 season. He made his Twenty20 debut on 17 August 2004, for Colts Cricket Club in the 2004 SLC Twenty20 Tournament.

He continued his first-class career for Colts until retiring in 2003. A strike rate of 53 in ODIs and 26 in Tests indicated that he was a dour player who did not score quickly. Although he never bowled at international level, he had 41 wickets to his name at first class level with an excellent average of 20. He scored over 7000 runs at first-class level including 16 centuries and 34 half centuries but never established himself at international level.

== International career ==
He was selected for the ODI team for his debut against the West Indies in Sharjah in November 1993, in which he only managed three runs. He played four more times, aggregating 91 runs and making his top-scoring of 49 in a successful run-chase against India in Jalandhar in early 1994. Despite top-scoring, he never played ODIs for Sri Lanka again.

He made his Test debut against the West Indies at Moratuwa in December 1993, after replacing Chandika Hathurusingha as an opener. He made a slow 16 from 107 balls on debut. He made his top score of 42 in his next Test against India in Lucknow and played the whole India series, before touring New Zealand in early 1995 when he played his final two Test matches. He was dropped, ending his international career, in which he failed to pass 50 in any of his 14 innings.

== Coaching career ==
Samaraweera was named interim head coach of the Victorian women's team in November 2023, and appointed to the full-time role in May in 2024.

He resigned less than a fortnight later following a disagreement over the appointment of an assistant batting coach. Samaraweera had requested the appointment of his brother, Thilan Samaraweera, to fill the assistant batting coach role, but this request was declined based on Cricket Victoria's policy that one relative should not report to another.

On 19 September 2024 Samaraweera was banned from holding any position within Australian cricket for 20 years after he was found to have committed a serious breach of the Cricket Australia code of conduct.
