= 2023 National Super League Limited Over Tournament =

Cricket tournament

- Dates: 11 March – 6 April 2024
- Administrator: Sri Lanka Cricket
- Cricket format: List A cricket
- Tournament format(s): Round-robin and Knockout
- Host: Sri Lanka
- Champions: Team Dambulla (1st title)
- Participants: 5
- Matches: 21

The 2023 National Super League Limited Over Tournament is the 2nd season of National Super League Limited Over Tournament, the List A cricket tournament that is played in Sri Lanka. The tournament is being held from 11 March to 6 April 2024. Jaffna were the defending champions and Dambulla won the tournament, defeating in the final.

== Final ==
Match 21
6 April 2024
14:30 (D/N)
Scorecard

Team Jaffna; 160 (47.3 Overs)	v	Team Dambulla; 163/5 (39 Overs)

Team Dambulla won by 5 wickets
R Premadasa Stadium, Colombo

- Team Dambulla won the toss and elected to bowl first.
