= Pubudu Dassanayake =

Canadian cricket coach

Personal information
- Full name: Pubudu Bathiya Dassanayake
- Born: 11 July 1970 (age 56); Kandy, Sri Lanka
- Batting: Right-handed
- Role: Wicket-keeper

International information
- National sides: Sri Lanka (1993–1994); Canada (2005–2006)
- Test debut (cap 57): 25 August 1993; Sri Lanka v South Africa
- Last Test: 20 October 1994; Sri Lanka v Zimbabwe
- ODI debut (cap 71): 2 September 1993; Sri Lanka v South Africa
- Last ODI: 8 December 1994; Sri Lanka v New Zealand

Domestic team information
- Years: Team
- 1990: Colts CC
- 1990–2001: Bloomfield CAC
- 1992: Sinhalese SC
- 1992–1995: Central Province

Head coaching information
- Years: Team
- 2007–2011: Canada
- 2011–2015: Nepal
- 2016–2019: United States
- 2021–2022: Nepal
- 2022–2024: Canada
- 2024: Janakpur Bolts
- 2025: Biratnagar Kings
- 2026–present: Galle Gallants

Career statistics
Competition	Test	ODI	FC	LA
Matches	11	16	108	58
Runs scored	196	85	3,840	679
Batting average	13.06	10.62	26.30	18.86
100s/50s	0/0	0/0	4/20	0/1
Top score	36	20*	144	53
Catches/stumpings	19/5	9/4	192/35	37/28
- Source: ESPNcricinfo, 3 September 2016

Pubudu Bathiya Dassanayake (/dəsəˈnaɪəkə/ də-sə-NY-ə-kə; (පුබුදු දසනායක Sinhala) born 11 July 1970) is a former international cricketer and coach who represented both Sri Lanka and Canada internationally. He has coached Everest Premier League side Bhairahawa Gladiators, and the national teams of the United States, Canada, and Nepal.

Dassanayake was born in Kandy, Sri Lanka. A wicket-keeper, he made his debut in first-class cricket in 1990, aged 19. Dassanayake's international debut came in August 1993, against South Africa. He spent just over a year as Sri Lanka's first-choice wicket-keeper, with his last international matches coming on a 1994 tour of New Zealand. In total, Dassanayake represented Sri Lanka in 11 Tests and 16 One Day International (ODI) matches. His domestic career, which was played mostly for the Bloomfield Cricket and Athletic Club, continued until the 2000–01 season.

After emigrating to Canada, Dassanayake made his international debut for Canada at the 2005 ICC Trophy. He also represented the team in the 2005 and 2006 editions of the ICC Intercontinental Cup. After his retirement as a player, he was appointed head coach of the national team in August 2007, having earlier spent several months as acting head coach. Dassanayake oversaw Canada's successful qualification for the 2011 World Cup, resigning as coach after the tournament's completion. He was appointed coach of Nepal in October 2011, and served until October 2015, coaching the team at the 2014 World Twenty20. Dassanayake was appointed United States head coach in September 2016, but resigned in July 2019.

== Playing career ==
=== Sri Lanka ===
Dassanayake was born in Kandy, in Sri Lanka's Central Province. A wicket-keeper, he made his first-class debut in January 1990, aged 19, playing for the Colts Cricket Club during the 1989–90 season of the Lakspray Trophy. Dassanayake switched to the Bloomfield Cricket and Athletic Club for the 1990–91 season, but played only a single limited-overs game. He appeared in another four one-day games the following season, playing twice for Bloomfield in the Hatna Trophy and also twice for the Sinhalese Sports Club in the Premadasa Trophy. Beginning in mid-1992, Dassanayake began to be selected for representative teams, playing first-class tournaments for Central Province and a Sri Lankan under-23s team. He toured Bangladesh with Sri Lanka A in December 1992, and the following month toured South Africa with a Sri Lankan under-24s side.

Leapfrogging Ashley de Silva and Romesh Kaluwitharana (the two wicket-keepers used in Sri Lanka's previous series) for selection, Dassanayake made his international debut in August 1993, playing three Tests and two ODIs in a home series against South Africa. Prior to the first Test, he had impressed selectors by recording six dismissals in an innings in a warm-up game for a Sri Lanka Board XI. After his debut series, Dassanayake's next international was a one-off Test against the West Indies in December 1993. The following month, he was selected for a tour of India, playing in three Tests and one ODI. At the 1994 Austral-Asia Cup in the United Arab Emirates, Dassanayake played ODIs against Australia and New Zealand for the first time. His next internationals came in a home series against Pakistan in August 1994. This was followed by the Singer World Series (a quadrangular ODI tournament hosted in Sri Lanka), and then by a tour of Zimbabwe.

Dassanayake played his final international matches in December 1994, at the Mandela Trophy (a one-off ODI tournament hosted in South Africa). He was unable to maintain his batting at the standard required for international competition, averaging just 13.06 across eleven Tests and 10.62 across sixteen ODIs. In his first domestic season after being dropped from the national team, Dassanayake scored two first-class centuries, including a career-high 144 for Bloomfield against the Panadura Sports Club. Although he never returned to the senior Sri Lankan team, he did play several more series for Sri Lanka A, appearing against the United Arab Emirates and India A in December 1995, against Bangladesh and Pakistan A in February 1997, and against England A in February 1998. His domestic career with Bloomfield ended after the 2000–01 season.

=== Canada ===
Dassanayake immigrated to Canada in 2001, settling in Ontario. After meeting the residency qualifications, he made his international debut for Canada at the 2005 ICC Trophy, held in Ireland. He appeared in all seven of his team's matches, recording eight dismissals (five catches and three stumpings) and scoring 76 runs, with a highest score of 36 not out against Scotland. Later in the year, Dassanayake represented Canada in ICC Intercontinental Cup matches against Bermuda and the Cayman Islands, serving as captain in the absence of John Davison. Against Bermuda, he played solely as a batsman, with Ashish Bagai taking the gloves. Dassanayake's final appearance for Canada came in August 2006, in an Intercontinental Cup game against Kenya. He was 36 at the time, and again played solely as a batsman.

== Coaching career ==
=== Canada ===
In August 2007 he was named as permanent coach of Canada, having been in temporary charge since June, replacing Andy Pick. Dassanayake coached Canada for almost 4 years leading them to the 2011 Cricket World Cup where the country won only its second ever World Cup match. Following the World Cup, Dassanayake elected not to renew his contract with Cricket Canada.

=== Nepal ===
Cricket Association of Nepal (CAN) appointed him as the coach of Nepal national cricket team on August 23, 2011, for six months. Fellow Sri Lankan Roy Dias had coached Nepal cricket team for 9 years before leaving in 2011.

Dassanayake has played a significant role in developing Nepalese cricket. Under his coaching, Nepal won the 2013 ICC World Cricket League Division Three. True to his earlier statement at a press conference three years prior, Nepal also qualified for the 2014 ICC World Twenty20 in Bangladesh during his tenure.

In October 2015, Dassanayake stepped down as Nepal coach, citing personal reasons, ending his four-year tenure in the role. His last game was against Papua New Guinea in November 2015. He was appointed as a consultant coach of Nepal for the match against Namibia in world cricket league and a match against MCC on the special request of ICC .

In December 2021, Dassanayake was re-appointed as Nepal Cricket team head Coach. Cricket Association of Nepal re-selected Pubudu as Nepal's coach out of 15 shortlisted Coaches. He then resigned from the position on 20 July 2022.

=== United States ===
In July 2016, Dassanayake was one of four candidates shortlisted for the vacant position of head coach of the U.S. national team. As part of the selection process, he served as a guest coach at a training camp for the national squad, and also coached a combined ICC Americas invitational team at the West Indies Cricket Board's under-19 tournament. In September 2016, it was announced that Dassanayake had won the position, with his first major tournament in charge to be the 2016 World Cricket League Division Four event in Los Angeles. The United States won the tournament and Dassanayake said "I wouldn't have settled for runner-up in the final" and that he was "very happy how things went in the final". In July 2019, Dassanayake resigned from his role as coach of the US national team. In August 2020, Dassanayake confirmed that he would be coaching franchise cricket in New Jersey.

=== Return to Nepal and Canada ===
Dassanayake re-joined Nepal as head coach in December 2021, but resigned in July 2022 in order to return as coach of Canada. Dassanayake was dismissed as the head coach of the Canada Cricket team ahead of the T20 World Cup 2024 in May 2024. Later a day, Cricket Canada confirmed that head coach Pubudu Dassanayake will stay on as head coach for the duration of the T20 World Cup 2024. After the T20 World Cup 2024, Cricket Canada sacked Pubudu in July 2024. Under his coaching, Canada was able to beat Ireland, a test playing full-member in the pool stage of T20 WC 2024.
