= Brian Rajadurai =

Canadian and Sri Lankan cricketer (born 1965)

Personal information
- Full name: Brian Eric Anton Rajadurai
- Born: 24 August 1965 (age 61); Colombo, Western Province, Dominion of Ceylon
- Batting: Right-handed
- Bowling: Leg break googly

International information
- National side: Canada

Domestic team information
- Years: Team
- 1988/89–2006/07: Sinhalese Sports Club

Career statistics
Competition	First-class	List A
Matches	31	23
Runs scored	381	85
Batting average	15.87	6.53
100s/50s	0/1	0/0
Top score	65	20
Balls bowled	2,884	845
Wickets	56	23
Bowling average	22.03	25.17
5 wickets in innings	3	0
10 wickets in match	0	0
Best bowling	5/53	4/20
Catches/stumpings	25/–	14/–
- Source: CricketArchive, 14 October 2011

Brian Rajadurai (born 24 August 1965) is a Canadian and Sri Lankan cricket player. He started his career playing first-class cricket in his native Sri Lanka and emigrated to Canada. He has represented Canada in the 1997 ICC Trophy and the 1998 Commonwealth Games.

In February 2020, he was named in Canada's squad for the Over-50s Cricket World Cup in South Africa. However, the tournament was cancelled during the third round of matches due to the coronavirus pandemic.
