= Bathiya Perera =

Sri Lankan cricketer (born 1977)

Personal information
- Born: 28 April 1977 (age 49); Colombo, Sri Lanka
- Batting: Right-handed
- Bowling: Right-arm leg break, off break

Career statistics
Competition	First-class	List A
Matches	115	68
Runs scored	5,170	1,408
Batting average	34.01	27.60
100s/50s	5/33	1/8
Top score	220*	102
Balls bowled	5,232	809
Wickets	101	27
Bowling average	33.64	21.44
5 wickets in innings	1	0
10 wickets in match	0	0
Best bowling	6/51	4/30
Catches/stumpings	124/–	35/–
- Source: CricketArchive

Wagawattage Maithree Bathiya Perera (born 28 April 1977) is a former Sri Lankan first class cricketer. A right-handed batsman and part-time leg break bowler, he has represented Sri Lanka A at international level.

Perera impressed in the under 23 and the premier tournaments of 2001/02 and 2002/03 where he was the highest runs scorer for both seasons. As a member of Sri Lanka A he has toured South Africa and played in the ICC six nation tournament in Namibia, New Zealand and the UK. In domestic cricket he has played for Colts Cricket Club, Colombo Cricket Club and Moors Sports Club. He has also spent time in the Australian Cricket Academy in Adelaide.
