= 2026 National Super League 4-Day Tournament =

Cricket tournament in Sri Lanka

- Dates: 6 April – 7 May 2026
- Administrator: Sri Lanka Cricket
- Cricket format: First-class
- Tournament format(s): Round-robin and final
- Host: Sri Lanka
- Participants: 4
- Matches: 6

The 2026 National Super League 4-Day Tournament is the fifth edition of the National Super League 4-Day Tournament, a first-class cricket competition in Sri Lanka. The tournament started on 6 April 2026, and the final match is scheduled to held between 4–7 May 2026. Four district cricket teams are taking part in the competition, organised by the Sri Lanka Cricket (SLC). In March 2026, the board confirmed the fixtures for the tournament.

Galle District are the defending champions.

== Points table ==
Pos	Team	Pld	W	L	D	Pts	Qualification
1	Dambulla District	3	1	0	2	36.94	Advanced to the final
2	Colombo District	3	0	0	3	19.16	Advanced to the final
3	Galle District	3	0	1	2	15.68	Eliminated
4	Kandy District	3	0	0	3	4.39	Eliminated

Source: ESPNcricinfo

== League stage ==
=== Round 1 ===
6–9 April 2026
Scorecard

Galle District	v	Kandy District
260 (80.2 overs); Oshada Fernando 84 (108); Chamika Gunasekara 5/45 (17 overs)		209 (58.2 overs); Sammu Ashan 52 (89); Isitha Wijesundara 5/56 (14 overs)
262 (95 overs); Sadeera Samarawickrama 76 (149); Chamika Karunaratne 3/28 (12 overs)		229/9 (55 overs); Pawantha Weerasinghe 61 (90); Asanka Manoj 3/60 (12 overs)

Match drawn
Rangiri Dambulla International Stadium, Dambulla
Umpires: Asanka Nanayakkara and Prageeth Rambukwella

- Galle won the toss and elected to bat.
- Isitha Wijesundara (Galle) took his 150th wicket in first-class cricket.
- Points: Galle 10.205, Kandy 0.095

6–9 April 2026
Scorecard

Dambulla District	v	Colombo District
408 (120 overs); Nishan Madushka 97 (197); Prabath Jayasuriya 3/110 (33 overs)		390 (123.2 overs); Ravindu Rasantha 69 (130); Shakthi Udara 4/97 (32.2 overs)
266/1 (76 overs); Nishan Madushka 107* (232); Dushan Hemantha 1/65 (16 overs)

Match drawn
R. Premadasa Stadium, Colombo
Umpires: Deepal Gunawardene and Raveendra Wimalasiri

- Dambulla won the toss and elected to bat.
- Lahiru Samarakoon and Nishan Madushka (Dambulla) both scored their 2,000th and 6,000th run in first-class cricket.
- Points: Dambulla 6.665, Colombo 2.075

=== Round 2 ===
19–22 April 2026
Scorecard

Colombo District	v	Kandy District
434/9d (143.2 overs); Sharujan Shanmuganathan 145 (338); Dinura Kalupahana 4/58 (16 overs)		393 (128.1 overs); Sohan de Livera 105 (154); Chamod Battage 4/43 (14 overs)
76/2 (18 overs); Dhananjaya Lakshan 33* (34); Dinura Kalupahana 2/26 (5 overs)

Match drawn
Rangiri Dambulla International Stadium, Dambulla
Umpires: Sanjeewa Fernando and Asanka Nanayakkara

- Colombo won the toss and elected to bat.
- Kavija Gamage (Colombo) made his first-class debut.
- Points: Colombo 7.19, Kandy 2.083

19–22 April 2026
Scorecard

Dambulla District	v	Galle District
255 (71.4 overs); Sadeera Samarawickrama 113 (169); Kavindu Pathiratne 5/41 (12.4 overs)		488 (130.4 overs); Lasith Croospulle 133 (173); Keshara Nuwantha 4/139 (41.4 overs)
192 (58.1 overs); Sadeera Samarawickrama 74 (121); Akila Dananjaya 4/60 (22.1 overs)

Dambulla won by an innings and 41 runs
R. Premadasa Stadium, Colombo
Umpires: Rasanja Dulsiri and Deepal Gunawardene

- Galle won the toss and elected to field.
- Points: Dambulla 20, Galle 2.118

=== Round 3 ===
25–28 April 2026
Scorecard

Dambulla District	v	Kandy District
451 (133.5 overs); Anjala Bandara 128 (225); Jeffrey Vandersay 3/53 (20 overs)		366 (136 overs); Ashen Bandara 94 (244); Nisala Abeyratne 5/106 (26 overs)
110/3 (22 overs); Lasith Croospulle 50* (58); Ravindu Fernando 2/22 (7 overs)

Match drawn
Mahinda Rajapaksa International Cricket Stadium, Hambantota
Umpires: Hemantha Boteju and Chaturan Sanjeewa

- Dambulla won the toss and elected to bat.
- Nisala Abeyratne (Dambulla) took his maiden five-wicket haul in first-class cricket.
- Points: Dambulla 10.275, Kandy 2.215

25–28 April 2026
Scorecard

Colombo District	v	Galle District
337 (97.2 overs); Janith Liyanage 98 (155); Muditha Lakshan 3/63 (24 overs)		273 (82.5 overs); Sadeera Samarawickrama 69 (110); Pramod Madushan 4/36 (13 overs)
224 (65 overs); Dhananjaya Lakshan 59 (92); Nimsara Atharagalla 3/28 (7 overs)		271/5 (44 overs); Nipun Dhananjaya 87 (80); Kavija Gamage 2/46 (8 overs)

Match drawn
Rangiri Dambulla International Stadium, Dambulla
Umpires: Shantha Fonseka and Chamara De Zoysa

- Galle won the toss and elected to field.
- Points: Colombo 9.903, Galle 3.36

== Final ==
4–7 May 2026
Scorecard

Dambulla District	v	Colombo District
222/9d (70 overs); Sonal Dinusha 51 (95); Prabath Jayasuriya 4/54 (18 overs)		146 (44.3 overs); Sharujan Shanmuganathan 44 (68); Kavindu Pathiratne 5/51 (13 overs)
222 (71.4 overs); Akila Dananjaya 53* (80); Chamod Battage 4/55 (15 overs)

R. Premadasa Stadium, Colombo
Umpires: Ravindra Kottahachchi and Chamara De Zoysa

- Dambulla won the toss and elected to bat.
