= Gehan Dassanayake =

Sri Lankan cricketer

Gehan Dassanayake was a Sri Lankan cricketer who played for Sinhalese Sports Club.

Dassanayake made a single first-class appearance for the side, during the 1988–89 season, against Burgher Recreation Club. He did not bat in the match, but bowled 7 overs, taking figures of 2–11.
