= 2024 National Super League Limited Over Tournament =

Cricket tournament

- Dates: 23 February – 9 March 2024
- Administrator(s): Sri Lanka Cricket
- Cricket format: List A cricket
- Tournament format(s): Round-robin and Knockout
- Champions: Team Dambulla (2nd title)
- Participants: 5
- Matches: 11
- Most runs: Kamil Mishara (315)
- Most wickets: Lahiru Kumara (9)

The 2024 National Super League Limited Over Tournament is the 3rd season of National Super League Limited Over Tournament, the List A cricket tournament that is played in Sri Lanka. The tournament is being held from 23 February to 9 March 2024. Dambulla were the defending champions and won the tournament, defeating in the final.

== Points table ==
| Pos | Team | Pld | W | L | NR | Pts | NRR |
|---|---|---|---|---|---|---|---|
| 1 | Team Dambulla (C) | 4 | 3 | 1 | 0 | 12 | — |
| 2 | Team Kandy (R) | 4 | 2 | 2 | 0 | 8 | 1.455 |
| 3 | Team Jaffna | 4 | 2 | 2 | 0 | 8 | 0.501 |
| 4 | Team Galle | 4 | 2 | 2 | 0 | 8 | −0.563 |
| 5 | Team Colombo | 4 | 1 | 3 | 0 | 4 | 0.366 |

Source: Cricinfo
(C) Champions; (R) Runners-up

Advanced to the Final

== Final ==
Match 11
10 March 2024
14:30 (D/N)
Scorecard

| Team Dambulla; 332/4 (50 Overs) | v | Team Kandy; 313 (45.3 Overs) |
| Pavan Rathnayake 118* (108); Pulina Tharanga 2/68 (9) | | Kamil Mishara 94 (95); Ayana Siriwardhana 3/58 (10) |

Team Dambulla won by 19 runs
R Premadasa Stadium, Colombo
Umpires: Gamini Dissanayake and Ravindra Kottahachchi

- Team Dambulla won the toss and elected to bat first.
