= Suraj Abeysekera =

Sri Lankan cricketer (born 1958)

Suraj Abayasekera (full name Raphael Suraj Abayasekera; born 24 October 1958) is a former Sri Lankan cricketer. He was born in Colombo. He has played for the Sinhalese Sports Club and the Sri Lanka Board President's XI teams in the domestic game and internationally he played for the under-25s in 1981 against the Tamil Nadu under-25s and for the Sri Lanka national cricket team in 1986 against the England B team. He was a first-class bowler in 9 matches from the 1978–79 season to 1989–90 and took 16 wickets. He bowled off break and was a right-handed batsman. His best bowling was 4–55 and his highest score was 41 runs, not out.

Abeysekera made his first-class debut in February 1979 when he played for the President's XI against the touring West Indies. His last match was in the 1988–89 Lakspray Trophy final for the Sinhalese against the Nondescripts Cricket Club.
