= Asitha Costa =

Sri Lankan cricketer (born 1970)

Asitha Costa (born 30 May 1970) was a Sri Lankan cricketer. He was a right-arm bowler who played for Sinhalese Sports Club.

Costa made a single first-class appearance for the side, during the 1992–93 season, against Moratuwa Sports Club. In the only innings in which he batted, he scored 11 runs.

Costa bowled 13 overs during the match, taking figures of 2-56.
