= Asitha Rathnaweera =

Sri Lankan cricketer

Asitha Rathnaweera was a Sri Lankan cricketer. He was a right-handed batsman and right-arm bowler who played for Panadura Sports Club.

Rathnaweera made two first-class appearances for the team, during the 1994–95 season, taking a single catch on his debut, but failing to score a single run from the tailend.

He scored just a single run in his second, and final, first-class appearance, and took a single catch - that of veteran Test player Aravinda de Silva.
