= Atula Abeysekera =

British Engineer

Atula Abeysekera HonFREngFCGI
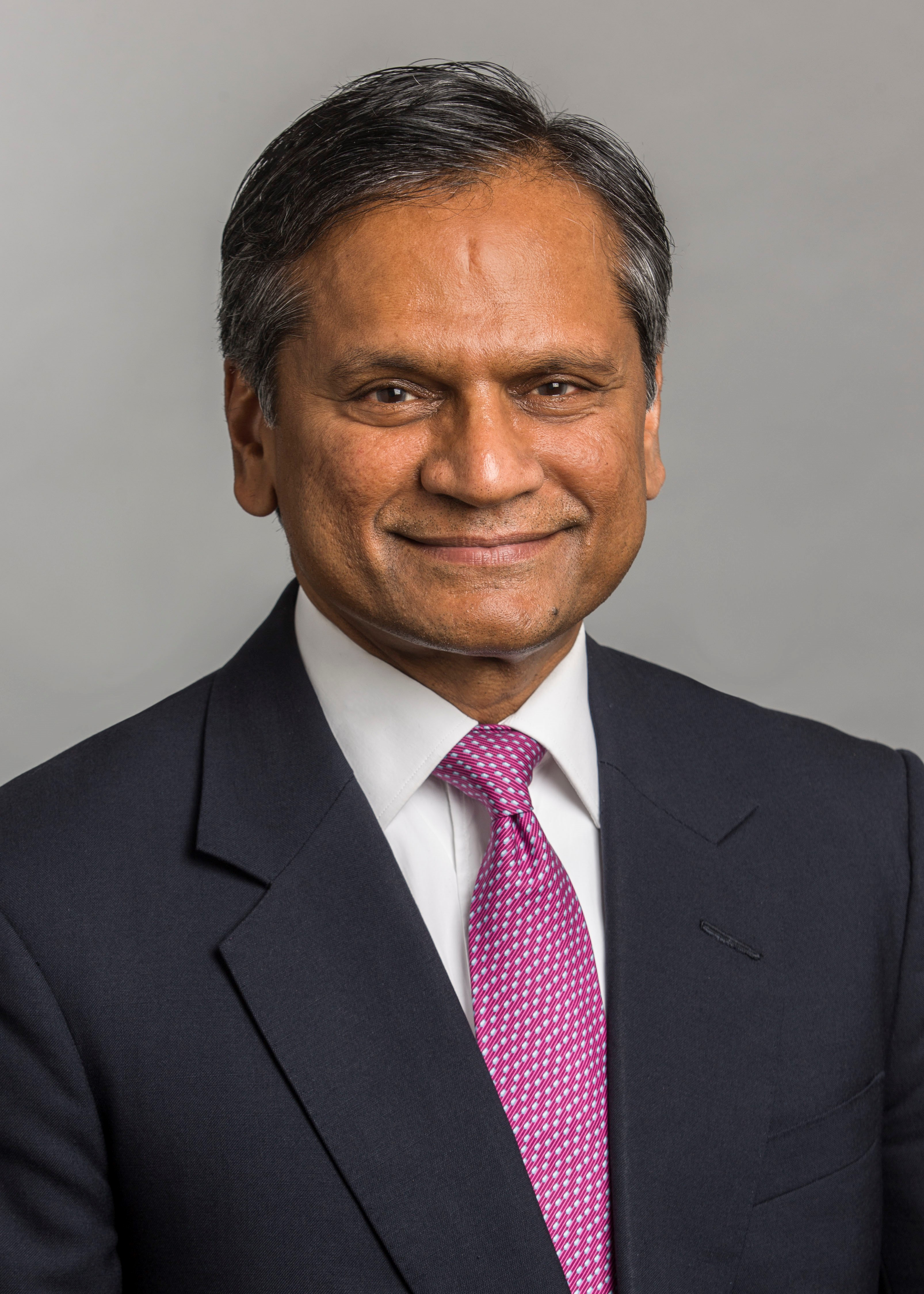

Personal details
- Born: London, England
- Education: Imperial College, London
- Awards: Freedom of the City of London (2011)

Atula Abeysekera HonFREng, FCGI is a British Engineer, a Professor and an expert in Enterprise Risk Management in Financial Services.

== Early life ==
Abeysekera was born in London, England and spent his early childhood in Sri Lanka, before returning to the United Kingdom. He graduated in civil engineering from Imperial College, London in 1981.

== Career ==
After graduating, Abeysekera then spent four years working as a civil engineer before deciding to pursue a career in Financial Services. He then went on to work for various Financial institutions such as KPMG, Morgan Stanley, Fidelity, Lazard and Schroders.

He was appointed by the Secretary State of Housing, Communities and Local Government to drive forward the building safety programme following the Grenfell tragedy. He remains a member of the Industry Safety Steering Group (ISSG).

Abeysekera is also a member of The Worshipful Company of International Bankers.

He is currently a professor of Practice in Risk Management at Imperial College and a member of the Court.

=== Notable Publications & Work ===
Abeysekera's publications have been republished by professional publications and a think tank. He is the author of the policy paper 'Black Swans means business'.

He is the author of the book 'What's the small idea? - Innovation and Risk Culture in Government'.

Abeysekera is frequently a speaker on Black Swans in Risk management.

On the 7th of December 2022, Abeysekera gave his well received Inaugural Lecture entitled 'Engineering a Better World' at Imperial College.

== Awards ==
In 2017, Abeysekera was awarded Fellowship by the City and Guilds of London Institute.

He is also a recipient of The Freedom of the City of London.

In 2024, Abeysekera was elected as an honorary fellow of the Royal Academy of Engineering for exceptional contributions to engineering.
