= Devdutt Padikkal =

Indian cricketer (born 2000)

- Padikkal playing for India in 2026

Personal information
- Born: 7 July 2000 (age 26); Edappal, Kerala, India
- Height: 1.9 m (6 ft 3 in)
- Batting: Left-handed
- Bowling: Right-arm off break
- Role: Top order batter

International information
- National side: India (2021–present)
- Test debut (cap 314): 7 March 2024 v England
- Last Test: 23 August 2026 v Sri Lanka
- T20I debut (cap 89): 28 July 2021 v Sri Lanka
- Last T20I: 29 July 2021 v Sri Lanka
- T20I shirt no.: 37

Domestic team information
- Years: Team
- 2018–present: Karnataka
- 2019–2021, 2025–present: Royal Challengers Bengaluru
- 2022–2023: Rajasthan Royals
- 2024: Lucknow Super Giants

Career statistics
Competition	Test	T20I	FC	T20
Matches	4	2	57	131
Runs scored	418	38	4,011	3,826
Batting average	69.66	19.00	44.56	32.42
100s/50s	2/1	0/0	10/21	4/24
Top score	167	29	232	124*
Catches/stumpings	3/–	0/–	64/–	67/–
Medal record
Men's cricket
Representing India
ACC U19 Asia Cup
Winner	2018 Bangladesh
- Source: Cricinfo, 19 August 2026

Devdutt Padikkal (born 7 July 2000) is an Indian cricketer who plays for the Indian national team as a left-handed top order batter. He represents Karnataka in domestic cricket and Royal Challengers Bengaluru in the Indian Premier League.

== Early life ==
Devdutt Padikkal was born on 7 July 2000 in Edappal, Kerala to Ambili Padikkal and Babunu Kunnath. Living in Hyderabad then, his father felt Bengaluru was the right place for his son to develop his potential. At the age of 10, Devdutt joined the Karnataka Institute of Cricket in Bengaluru, where he began his training. He completed his early schooling at the Army Public School and the St Joseph's Boys' High School, Bengaluru. He later earned a Bachelor of Business Administration degree from St. Joseph's College of Commerce in Bengaluru.

== Domestic career ==
Devdutt made his first-class debut for Karnataka in the 2018–19 Ranji Trophy on 28 November 2018.

He made his List A debut on 26 September 2019, for Karnataka in the 2019–20 Vijay Hazare Trophy. He was the leading run-scorer in the tournament, with 609 runs in eleven matches. In October 2019, he was named in India A's squad for the 2019–20 Deodhar Trophy. He made his Twenty20 debut on 8 November 2019, for Karnataka in the 2019–20 Syed Mushtaq Ali Trophy.

He was selected in Karnataka's squad for the 2021–22 Syed Mushtaq Ali Trophy.

In March 2022, he made his maiden first-class century, with 178 runs in the 2021–22 Ranji Trophy match against Puducherry.

In August 2024, he was named in India D's squad for 2024–25 Duleep Trophy.

== International cricket ==
Padikkal playing a Test match for India against New Zealand in November 2026

In June 2021, Devdutt was named in India's One Day International and Twenty20 International (T20I) squads for their series against Sri Lanka. He made his T20I debut on 28 July 2021, for India against Sri Lanka.

In February 2024, he was added to India's Test squad for their series against England as a replacement of KL Rahul. He made his Test debut in the fifth match of the same series on 7 March 2024. He scored 65 runs off 103 balls in his debut test innings, which included 10 fours and 1 six.

On 15 August, 2026, he hit his maiden Test and international century during the first test against Sri Lanka, off 134 balls. He ended up scoring 167 off 230 balls. During the second test against Sri Lanka, at Colombo on 23 August, he hit another century and scored 117 off 193 balls.

== Indian Premier League ==
In December 2018, Devdutt was bought by the Royal Challengers Bengaluru in the player auction for the 2019 Indian Premier League (IPL). He became the first player in IPL history to score three fifties in his first four matches.

He won the Emerging Player Award for the 2020 Indian Premier League, playing for Royal Challengers Bengaluru. He scored 473 runs in 15 matches for Royal Challengers Bengaluru in that IPL season.

On 22 April 2021, in the 2021 Indian Premier League, he scored his maiden hundred with the score of 101*, as the Royal Challengers Bengaluru beat the Rajasthan Royals by ten wickets.

In February 2022, he was bought by the Rajasthan Royals in the auction for the 2022 Indian Premier League. In April 2022, while playing for the Rajasthan Royals, he scored his 1,000th run in the IPL.

In November 2023, he was traded to Lucknow Super Giants ahead of the auction of the 2024 season.

He was bought by the Royal Challengers Bengaluru at his base price of ₹2 crore (equivalent to ₹2.1 crore or US$220,000 in 2026) in the 2025 Indian Premier League auction. Midway through the season, he was ruled out due to injury.

== International centuries ==
=== Test centuries ===
Runs	Against	Pos.	Inn.	Test	S/R	Venue	H/A/N	Date	Result
167	Sri Lanka	3	1	1/2	72.60	Galle International Stadium, Galle	Away	15 August 2026	Won
117	Sri Lanka	3	1	2/2	60.62	SSC Cricket Ground, Colombo	Away	23 August 2026	Draw
