= 2022–23 Major Clubs Limited Over Tournament =

Cricket tournament

- Dates: 27 June – 2 August 2022
- Administrator: Sri Lanka Cricket
- Cricket format: List A cricket
- Tournament format: Round-robin then knockout
- Host: Sri Lanka
- Champions: Tamil Union (2nd title)
- Participants: 26
- Matches: 113

The 2022–23 Major Clubs Limited Over Tournament was the 3rd edition of the Major Clubs Limited Over Tournament, a List A cricket competition in Sri Lanka. The tournament began on 27 June 2022 and the final was held on 2 August 2022. Tamil Union were the defending champions and won the tournament by defeating the Sri Lanka Army Sports Club in the final.
