= Naresh Adikaram =

Sri Lankan cricketer (born 1970)

Naresh Adikaram (born 17 September 1970) is a former Sri Lankan cricketer. He was born in Colombo. He has played for the Sinhalese Sports Club in the domestic game and internationally he did not play. He was a right-handed batsman in 8 matches from the 1993–94 season to 1996–97 and scored 273 runs. His highest score was 55 not out. He never bowled.

Adikaram made his first-class debut in March 1994 when he played for the Sinhalese in the 1993–94 Premadasa Trophy against the Moratuwa Sports Club. His last match was in February 1997 in the Saravanamuttu Trophy for the Sinhalese against the Kurunegala Youth Cricket Club.
