= Colombo Cricket Club Ground =

Cricket stadium in Sri Lanka

- Maitland Crescent
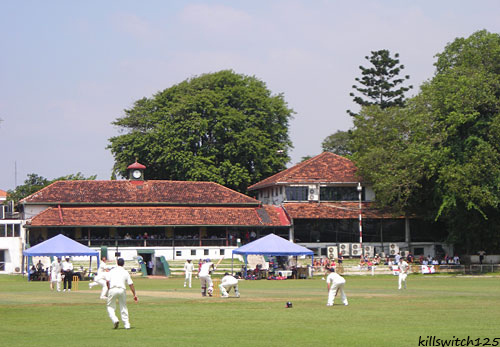
- Interactive map of Colombo Cricket Club Ground

Ground information
- Location: Maitland Crescent, Colombo 7
- Country: Sri Lanka
- Coordinates: 6.907808°N 79.865911°E
- Capacity: 6,000
- Owner: Colombo Cricket Club
- Tenants: Colombo Cricket Club
- End names
- Press Box End; Pavilion End

International information
- First men's Test: 14 March 1984: Sri Lanka v New Zealand
- Last men's Test: 16 April 1987: Sri Lanka v New Zealand
- First women's ODI: 15 February 2017: Bangladesh v Ireland
- Last women's ODI: 19 February 2017: Ireland v South Africa
- First women's T20I: 22 September 2018: Sri Lanka v India
- Last women's T20I: 24 September 2018: Sri Lanka v India

Team information
Colombo Cricket Club	(c.1894 – present)
- As of 15 July 2025; Source: ESPNcricinfo

Colombo Cricket Club Ground (CCCG; Sinhala: කොළඹ ක්‍රිකට් සමාජ ක්‍රීඩාංගනය, Tamil: கொலோம்போ கிரிக்கெட் கிளப் கிரௌண்ட்) is a multi-purpose stadium in Colombo, Sri Lanka. It is currently used mostly for domestic first-class cricket matches and for hosting warm up matches for touring teams. The stadium can hold 6,000 people and hosted its first Test match in 1984. It is one of the smallest test grounds in the world. Three Test matches have been held at the Colombo Cricket Club Ground.

== Ground ==
The Colombo Cricket Club Ground is the home ground of the Colombo Cricket Club, the oldest first-class cricket club in Sri Lanka. The Ground is one of the three cricket grounds located in Maitland Crescent, Colombo, the other two being the Sinhalese Sports Club Ground and the Nondescripts Cricket Club Ground. It is one of the smaller cricket grounds in Sri Lanka, and is also one of the smallest Test cricket grounds in the world. The Colombo Cricket Club Ground was formerly known as the Maitland Crescent Ground.

The playing area of the ground takes up most of the space with a narrow area available for spectators to be seated on each side. On one end of the ground is the scoreboard and a concrete stand that houses the press box. This end is known as the Press Box End. The other end is the Pavilion End, where the main pavilion is located. The ground can hold 6,000 spectators.

== Matches held ==
The first cricket match on the Colombo Cricket Club Ground was held during the 1911–12 season. Its maiden first-class cricket match was held in 1927 when the Europeans (Ceylon) hosted the Marylebone Cricket Club. The ground also hosted a Marylebone Cricket Club team captained by Douglas Jardine in 1933–34.

Three Test matches have been played at the Colombo Cricket Club Ground. The first was held in March 1984, between Sri Lanka and New Zealand, resulting in a win for New Zealand by an innings and 61 runs. Another Test match was held between Sri Lanka and Pakistan in March 1986. The last Test at the ground was in April 1987, again between Sri Lanka and New Zealand.

At the ground in 1973–74, Sri Lanka played its first two international List A matches, against India. India won both matches.

Domestic first-class and List A matches are regularly played at the ground. It also hosts touring teams in warm-up matches. The ground was one of the five venues for the 2006 under-19 Cricket World Cup.

== International centuries ==
There are four Test centuries have been scored at the venue.

No.	Score	Player	Team	Balls	Opposing team	Date	Result
1	180	John Reid	New Zealand	445	Sri Lanka	24 March 1984	Won
2	201*	Brendon Kuruppu	Sri Lanka	548	New Zealand	16 April 1987	Drawn
3	120*	Jeff Crowe	New Zealand	398	Sri Lanka	16 April 1987	Drawn
4	151*	Richard Hadlee	New Zealand	240	Sri Lanka	16 April 1987	Drawn

== List of five-wicket hauls ==
Five five-wicket hauls in Test matches have been taken at the venue.

No.	Bowler	Date	Team	Opposing team	Inn	Overs	Runs	Wkts	Econ	Result
1	Richard Hadlee	24 March 1984	New Zealand	Sri Lanka	1	22	73	5	3.31	Won
2	Ewen Chatfield	24 March 1984	New Zealand	Sri Lanka	1	22	63	5	2.86	Won
3	Richard Hadlee	24 March 1984	New Zealand	Sri Lanka	3	16	29	5	1.81	Won
4	Kosala Kuruppuarachchi	14 March 1986	Sri Lanka	Pakistan	1	14.5	44	5	2.96	Won
5	Ravi Ratnayeke	14 March 1986	Sri Lanka	Pakistan	3	17	37	5	2.17	Won

== See also ==
- List of Test cricket grounds
