= Peter Roach (cricketer) =

Australian cricketer (born 1975)

Personal information
- Born: 19 May 1975 (age 51); Melbourne, Australia

Domestic team information
- Years: Team
- 1995-2005: Victoria
- Source: Cricinfo, 12 December 2015

Peter Roach (born 19 May 1975) is an Australian former cricketer. He played 25 first-class cricket matches for Victoria between 1995 and 2005.

== See also ==
- List of Victoria first-class cricketers
