= Aruna Gunawardene =

Sri Lankan cricketer (born 1969)

Personal information
- Full name: Aruna Alwis Wijesiri Gunawardena
- Born: March 31, 1969 (age 57); Colombo
- Batting: Right-handed
- Bowling: Right-arm medium

International information
- National side: Sri Lanka
- Only ODI (cap 76): 18 February 1994 v India
- Source: Cricinfo, 1 May 2006

Aruna Alwis Wijesiri Gunawardene (born 31 March 1969) is a former Sri Lankan cricketer who played one One Day International in 1994.
