= Singhalese Sports Club =

First-class cricket club in Colombo, Sri Lanka

Personnel
- Captain: (Sri Lanka) Charith Asalanka
- Coach: (Sri Lanka) Saman Jayantha
- Fielding coach: (Sri Lanka) Vimukthi Deshapriya

Team information
- City: Colombo
- Colours: White
- Founded: 27 March 1899; 127 years ago
- Home ground: Singhalese Sports Club Cricket Ground
- Capacity: 10,000

History
- Premier Trophy wins: 32 (including 3 shared)
- Premier Limited Overs Tournament wins: 8
- Twenty20 Tournament wins: 1 (2005–06)
- Major Clubs Limited Over Tournament wins: 1
- Notable players: Mahela Jayawardena; Thilan Samaraweera; Marvan Atapattu; Arjuna Ranatunga; Dasun Shanaka; Charith Asalanka

The Singhalese Sports Club (SSC) is a First-class cricket club in Colombo, Sri Lanka Singhalese is the most successful club in Sri Lankan domestic cricket, having won the Premier Trophy a record 32 times to 2017. Although the name is correctly spelt with the old spelling "Singhalese", the name is sometimes misspelt with the modern spelling "Sinhalese". Three former Prime Ministers of Sri Lanka have been presidents of the club.

The club was relegated in 2025 following the Major Club 3 day tournament in which they could only muster a single victory and lost 2 of their 8 matches

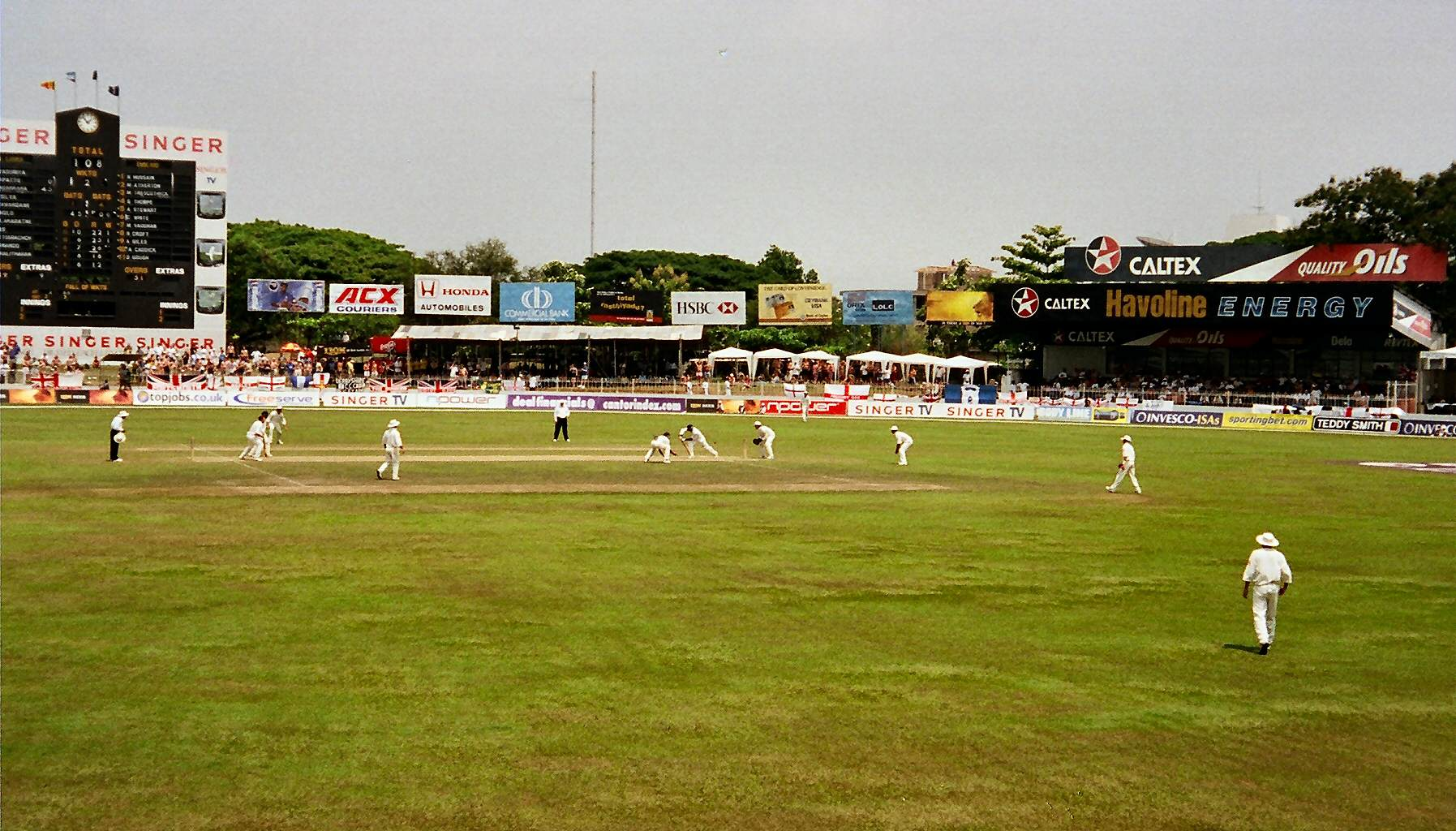
A Test match between Sri Lanka and England at the SSC Ground, Colombo, March 2001.

== History ==
In 1899, a combined school cricket team, composed mainly of cricketers from Royal College, S. Thomas' College and Wesley College beat Colts Cricket Club by one run. The SSC was inaugurated the same year and established as a cricket club by a group of distinguished Ceylonese lawyers, legislators, businessmen, proprietary planters and civil society leaders of that time.

In 1900, the club leased a land in Victoria Park with sandy soil and covered with cinnamon trees. This land was gradually leveled to a cricket ground and its first match was played the following year. The First President of the Club was Sir Harry Dias, First Hony. Secretary H.J.V.I. Ekanayake, First Treasurer Philip de Silva & First Cricket Captain – O.G. de Alwis. The Club attracted the best school boy players from Royal, S. Thomas', Wesley, St. Josephs & Trinity.

== Club presidents ==
| President | Term of office |
|---|---|
| Harry Dias Bandaranaike | 1899–1901 |
| Sir Solomon C Obeysekera | 1901–1927 |
| James Peiris | 1927–1930 |
| D.S. Senanayake | 1930–1952 |
| Sir John Kotelawala | 1952–1980 |
| J.R. Jayawardene | 1980–1996 |
| Ryle de Soysa | 1997–1998 |
| Daya Perera | 1999–2008 |
| W.T. Ellawala | 2008 – present |

== Honours ==
- Premier Trophy (32) – 1938–39, 1939–40, 1943–44, 1944–45, 1946–47, 1947–48, 1948–49, 1949–50, 1951–52, 1958–59, 1959–60, 1961–62, 1966–67, 1968–69, 1971–72, 1972–73, 1973–74, 1974–75, 1977–78, 1983–84, 1985–86*, 1986–87, 1988–89*, 1989–90, 1990–91, 1992–93, 1994–95*, 1997–98, 2005–06, 2007–08, 2012–13, 2016-17, 2023-24
- Major Clubs Limited Over Tournament (1) – 2023–24

== Current squad ==
Players with international caps are listed in bold

| No | Name | Nat | Age | Batting style | Bowling style |
Batsmen
| 21 | **Dimuth Karunaratne** | (Sri Lanka) | 38 | Left-handed | Right-arm medium |
| 22 | Shammu Ashan | (Sri Lanka) | 28 | Right-handed | Right-arm off-break |
| – | Kavindu Kulasekara | (Sri Lanka) | 31 | Right-handed | Right-arm off-break |
| – | Pasindu Sooriyabandara | (Sri Lanka) | 27 | Right-handed | – |
| 23 | Nuwanidu Fernando | (Sri Lanka) | 27 | Right-handed | Right-arm off-break |
All-rounders
| 7 | **Dasun Shanaka** | (Sri Lanka) | 35 | Right-handed | Right-arm medium |
| 18 | **Sachithra Senanayake** (Captain) | (Sri Lanka) | 41 | Right-handed | Right-arm off-break |
| 70 | **Danushka Gunathilaka** | (Sri Lanka) | 35 | Left-handed | Right-arm off-break |
| 14 | **Charith Asalanka** (Vice-captain) | (Sri Lanka) | 29 | Left-handed | Right-arm off-break |
Wicketkeepers
| 52 | **Sandun Weerakkody** | (Sri Lanka) | 33 | Left-handed | – |
| 12 | Krishan Sanjula | (Sri Lanka) | 28 | Right-handed | – |
Bowlers
| 30 | **Dhammika Prasad** | (Sri Lanka) | 43 | Right-handed | Right-arm fast-medium |
| 63 | **Nuwan Pradeep** | (Sri Lanka) | 40 | Right-handed | Right-arm fast-medium |
| – | Himesh Ramanayake | (Sri Lanka) | 29 | Right-handed | Right-arm medium-fast |
| – | Kalana Perera | (Sri Lanka) | 26 | Left-handed | Left-arm medium-fast |
| 5 | Kushan Weerakkody | (Sri Lanka) | 32 | Left-handed | Right-arm medium-fast |
| 46 | **Jeffrey Vandersay** | (Sri Lanka) | 36 | Right-handed | Right-arm leg-break |
| 15 | Akash Senaratne | (Sri Lanka) | 30 | Left-handed | Slow left-arm orthodox |
| 00 | Tharindu Rathnayake | (Sri Lanka) | 30 | Left-handed | Slow left-arm orthodox, Right-arm off-break |

== Notable players ==
Sinhalese players who have represented Sri Lanka in Test, One Day International and Twenty20 International cricket

- Saliya Ahangama
- Marvan Atapattu
- Chamara Silva
- Ashantha de Mel
- Pubudu Dassanayake
- Guy de Alwis
- Roy Dias
- Binura Fernando
- Dilhara Fernando
- Nisal Fernando
- Danushka Gunathilaka
- Avishka Gunawardane
- Asanka Gurusinha
- Dinuka Hettiarachchi
- Mahela Jayawardena
- Dimuth Karunaratne
- Kaushal Lokuarachchi
- Duleep Mendis
- Tharanga Paranavitana
- Ruchira Perera
- Suresh Perera
- Nuwan Pradeep
- Dhammika Prasad
- Arjuna Ranatunga
- Dammika Ranatunga
- Sanjeeva Ranatunga
- Thilan Samaraweera
- Sachithra Senanayake
- Jayantha Silva
- Kaushal Silva
- Thilan Thushara
- Mithra Wettimuny
- Sidath Wettimuny
- Pramodya Wickramasinghe
- Piyal Wijetunge
- Nuwan Zoysa

== Players who have represented the Singhalese Sports Club in top-level domestic cricket ==
- Dunil Abeydeera
- Ranil Abeynaike
- Sanka Abeyruwan
- Suraj Abeysekera
- Naresh Adikaram
- Saliya Ahangama
- Geeth Alwis
- Stefan Anthonisz
- Suranga Arunakumara
- Mohamed Aslam
- Marvan Atapattu
- Chaminda Bandara
- Rajitha Basnayake
- Minod Bhanuka
- Sohan Boralessa
- Chaminda Boteju
- N. Buddhasiri

(wicket-keeper; 2 matches in 1988–89)

- Asitha Costa
- Ian Daniel
- Gehan Dassanayake
- Pubudu Dassanayake
- Guy de Alwis
- Rohan de Silva
- Shamal de Silva
- Kavinda de Thissera
- Ranil Dhammika
- Gagan Dissanayake
- Mahesha Dissanayake
- Samantha Dodanwela
- Gamini Dushantha
- Thilina Embuldeniya
- Binura Fernando
- Chaminda Fernando
- Dilhara Fernando
- Hans Fernando
- Lasith Fernando
- Lilan Fernando
- Milan Fernando
- Muditha Fernando
- Nisal Fernando
- Radhive Fernando
- Sanjaya Fernando
- Sham Fernando
- Upekha Fernando
- Upul Fernando
- Wesley Fernando
- Ruwan Galappathy
- Lahiru Gamage
- Suresh Gunasekera
- Chathupama Gunasinghe
- Danushka Gunathilaka
- Aruna Gunawardene
- Avishka Gunawardene
- Asanka Gurusinha
- Mahinda Halangoda
- Suresh Harding
- Dinuka Hettiarachchi
- Mohamed Iftikhar
- Damith Indika
- Charith Jayampathi
- Mahela Jayawardene
- Prasanna Jayawardene
- Thilina Kandamby
- Chamara Kapugedera
- Dimuth Karunaratne
- Kaushal Lokuarachchi
- Kasun Madushanka
- Gayan Maneshan
- Ushan Manohara
- Duleep Mendis
- Jeevan Mendis
- Manjula Munasinghe
- Tharanga Paranavitana
- Suresh Perera
- Thisara Perera
- Nuwan Pradeep
- Amil Prasad
- Dhammika Prasad
- Brian Rajadurai
- Bhanuka Rajapaksa
- Sanka Ramesh
- Arjuna Ranatunga
- Dammika Ranatunga
- Nishantha Ranatunga
- Sanjeeva Ranatunga
- Suraj Randiv
- Thilan Samaraweera
- Sachithra Senanayake
- Dasun Shanaka
- Chamara Silva
- Jayantha Silva
- Kaushal Silva
- Sanjeewa Silva
- Don Somasiri
- Charith Sylvester
- Chaminda Vidanapathirana
- Hemantha Wickramaratne
- Pramodya Wickramasinghe
- Pubudu Dushyantha De Silva
- Gayan Wijekoon
- Vishva Wijeratne
- Piyal Wijetunge
- Nuwan Zoysa
