= Sonal Dinusha =

Sri Lankan cricketer (born 2000)

Personal information
- Full name: Gamage Sonal Dinusha
- Born: 4 December 2000 (age 25); Colombo, Sri Lanka
- Batting: Left-handed
- Bowling: Slow left arm orthodox
- Role: All-rounder

International information
- National side: Sri Lanka (2025–present)
- Test debut (cap 170): 25 June 2025 v Bangladesh
- Last Test: 23 August 2026 v India

Domestic team information
- Years: Team
- 2018/19–present: Colombo CC
- 2023: Galle Titans
- 2024-Present: Dambulla Sixers

Career statistics
Competition	Test	FC
Matches	5	70
Runs scored	606	4,118
Batting average	86.57	48.44
100s/50s	3/2	14/20
Top score	133*	145
Balls bowled	525	6,687
Wickets	6	133
Bowling average	53.50	28.24
5 wickets in innings	0	7
10 wickets in match	0	2
Best bowling	3/22	8/67
Catches/stumpings	2/–	53/–
- Source: Cricinfo, 27 August 2026

Gamage Sonal Dinusha (born 4 December 2000) is a professional Sri Lankan cricketer who currently plays for the national team in Test Cricket. He began his school life at De La Salle College, Colombo, initially playing basketball before turning to cricket. He represented the school at Under-13 level and subsequently progressed through the Under-15 and Under-17 teams. He later captained the school cricket team. In 2015, he was awarded De La Salle College Colours for cricket. Later he moved to Mahanama College. He is a handy allrounder who also could ball handy left arm orthodox spin. He bats under great technique and usually likes to go on for sweep shot which he gets more runs.

== Career ==
He made his first-class debut for Colombo Cricket Club in the 2018–19 Premier League Tournament on 30 November 2018. He made his List A debut for Colombo Cricket Club in the 2018–19 Premier Limited Overs Tournament on 10 March 2019. In January 2020, he was named in Sri Lanka's squad for the 2020 Under-19 Cricket World Cup. He made his Twenty20 debut on 4 March 2021, for Colombo Cricket Club in the 2020–21 SLC Twenty20 Tournament.

On 17 August, 2026, Dinusha hit the first Test century of his career against India during the first Test match, hitting 100 runs off 168 balls.

On 26 August, 2026, second test match against India he scored his second test century hitting 103 runs from 162 balls. After India enforced follow on he continued his form by hitting another century by scoring 133 runs from 264 balls. Dinusha had batted for a combined 426 balls and he finished with 419 runs at an average of 139.66. While batting Keshara Nuwantha and Dinusha had batted through a wicketless first session on fifth day, and put on 112 in 246 balls for the seventh wicket. His knock received praise from former and current cricketers. India's captain Shubman Gill, on Sonal Dinusha's second innings, he mentioned "He didn't give us even half a chance".

Dinusha became only the sixth batter to score three hundreds in a Test series while batting at No. 6 or lower. He is the first Sri Lankan to do so, and also the first to do so in a two-match series.

Dinusha, with hi s twin hundreds in Colombo, became only the fifth batter to score hundreds in both innings of a Test match while batting at No. 6 or lower. Three of the previous four instances have been by Sri Lankan batters only.

176 runs were scored through sweep shots by Dinusha in the two-match series against India, the most by a batter in a Test series.

Due to his consistent performance Sri Lanka managed to draw the second match and Dinusha won player of the match award.

== International centuries ==
=== Key ===
- * – Remained not out
- † – Man of the match

=== Test centuries ===
No.	Score	Against	Pos.	Inn.	Test	S/R	Venue	H/A/N	Date	Result	Ref
1	100	India	6	2	1/2	59.52	Galle International Stadium, Galle	Home	15–19 August 2026	Lost	
2	103 †	India	7	2	2/2	63.58	SSC Cricket Ground, Colombo	Home	23–27 August 2026	Drawn	
3	133* †	India	6	3	2/2	50.37	SSC Cricket Ground, Colombo	Home	23–27 August 2026	Drawn	

== Achievements ==
- ICC Player of the Month: August 2026
