= Nisal Fernando =

Sri Lankan cricketer (born 1970)

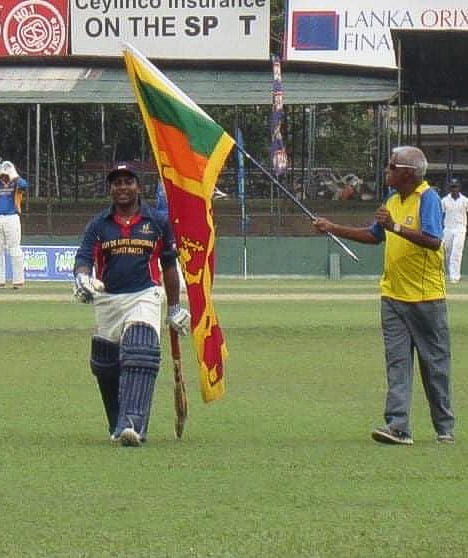

Personal information
- Full name: Sellapperumage Nisal Madusanka Fernando
- Born: 10 March 1970 (age 56)
- Batting: Right-handed
- Bowling: Wicketkeeper

International information
- National side: Sri Lanka (1994)
- ODI debut (cap 74): 15 February 1994 v India
- Last ODI: 18 February 1994 v India
- Source: Cricinfo, 1 May 2006

Ungamandadige Nisal Kumudusiri Fernando (born 10 March 1970) is a former Sri Lankan cricketer who played two One Day Internationals in 1994.
