= Ace Capital Cricket Club =

Cricket team in Sri Lanka

Ace Capital Cricket Club is a first-class cricket club based in Negombo, Sri Lanka. It was originally founded in 1989 as the Seeduwa/Raddoluwa Cricket Club. In 2011, it became the Sri Lanka Ports Authority Cricket Club. The Sri Lanka Ports Authority withdrew sponsorship for the club in October 2020 and the club was renamed Ace Capital ahead of the 2020–21 season. As of 27 December 2024, Ace Capital competes in the Major League Tournament.

== History ==
Seeduwa Raddoluwa joined the revamped Sri Lankan first-class competition in the 2008–09 season, becoming the 32nd team to take part in the competition. They played in the 2008–09, 2009–10 and 2010–11 seasons.

In 2011–12, under the new name of Sri Lanka Ports Authority Club, captained by Shantha Kalavitigoda, they competed in Tier B of the Premier Trophy. They won three matches, lost one and drew five, and finished fourth out of ten teams. Captained by Shanuka Dissanayake, they again finished fourth in 2012–13 in the group now named Group B, with three wins, three losses and three draws. In the restructured competition in 2013–14 they finished third in Group A, with two wins, two losses and two draws, and progressed to the Super Eight league, where they finished last, with one win, five losses and a draw. Ashan Priyanjan was captain in most matches.

Captained by Mahela Udawatte, and with Malinda Pushpakumara leading the Premier Trophy bowling with 70 wickets at an average of 16.72, they won the Premier Trophy in 2014–15, winning eight out of their 13 matches and losing only once. At the end of the season they had played 44 matches, with 17 wins, 12 losses and 15 draws.

At the end of the 2013–14 season the leading run-scorer was Gayan Maneshan with 1,288 runs at an average of 53.66. The leading wicket-taker was Chanaka Komasaru with 76 wickets at 29.39. The highest individual score was 235 by Ashan Priyanjan against Kurunegala Youth Cricket Club in 2012–13. The best bowling figures were 7 for 58 by Isuru Udana against Sinhalese Sports Club in 2013–14.

== Current squad ==
The following players have represented Ace Capital in 2022–23:

- P. S. Anil
- N. H. Atharagalla
- T. S. Baskaran
- K. G. B. Chandrabose
- S. M. Colombage
- N. H. G. Cooray
- D. L. S. Croospulle
- P. T. M. Dabare
- B. A. D. A. Dilhara
- G. P. S. Disanayaka
- B. O. P. Fernando
- P. C. Hettiwatte
- K. Ishwara
- M. M. Jaleel
- D. K. R. C. Jayatissa
- N. N. Kadam
- W. S. Kumara
- S. N. Liyanage
- Mohammad Irfan
- Mohammad Rizlan
- R. J. K. T. D. Ranatunga
- M. B. C. D. Thilakarathne
- D. Thissakuttige

== Honours ==
- Major Clubs Limited Over Tournament (1) – 2024
