= Colombo Cricket Club =

Cricket club in Sri Lanka

Personnel
- Captain: (Sri Lanka) Sonal Dinusha
- Coach: (Sri Lanka) Lakshan Sandakan

Team information
- Colours: Maroon
- Founded: 1863; 163 years ago
- Home ground: Colombo Cricket Club Ground, Colombo 7
- Capacity: 6,000

History
- Premier Trophy wins: 10
- Official website: gymkhanaclub.lk

The Colombo Cricket Club (CCC) is a first-class cricket club in Sri Lanka. It is the oldest in the country, having been formed in 1863, and is headquartered at 31 Maitland Crescent, Colombo 7, close to the headquarters of Sri Lanka Cricket.

== History ==
The idea of a gentlemen's team for British colonists in Ceylon was first mooted among the patrons of the Colombo Club- a social club for the British upper class then located at the Galle Face Green (not to be confused with the 1871 club of the same name and location). The beginnings of the club proper can then be traced back to a notice in the Colombo Journal of 5 September 1832, which called for "...gentlemen who may be inclined towards forming a Cricket Club..." to "...meet at the Library (located in the Pettah) at 2 o'clock precisely on the 8th instant". Sources then differ as to the exact date of the formation of the club, some citing 8 September, October, or November of the same year, with all sources agreeing that a cricket club was formed sometime in 1832. The newly formed club was located in Slave Island, on the land that later became the Rifle Green (now the site of the Defence Services School). The first officially recorded game of cricket in the country was that between the eventual CCC and a team fielded by the 97th Regiment of the British Army stationed in Ceylon at the time, in November 1832. The club soon became a hub for cricketing activity in the country, becoming the de facto governing body for cricket in Ceylon.

The Colombo Club went through an expansion phase in 1863, becoming the Colombo Gymkhana Club, a parent/umbrella organisation that acted as a social club while at the same time administering a number of different sports clubs- the CCC included (alongside the CH&FC for rugby and hockey in 1892 and the Queen's Club for tennis and squash in 1899). The CCC is thought to have been formally named with its current name sometime in 1863, and moved to Galle Face Green sometime during this period as well. In 1894, the club moved again, this time to its present address at Maitland Crescent. It remained a Europeans-only club until 1962, and celebrated its 150th anniversary in 2013.

== Management ==
=== Executive Committee ===
Position	Name
President	Shammi Silva
Vice President	Mohan de Silva
General Secretary	Bandula Dissanayake
Treasurer	Lasantha Gunaratne

=== Technical Staff ===
Role	Name
Head coach	Lakshan Sandakan
Manager	Lasantha Jayawardena
Analyst	Navidu Wickramaarachchi
Assistant Coach	Woshantha Silva
Assistant Coach	Yasaruwan Herath
Assistant Coach	Sonal Dulshan
Physiotherapist	Manoj Jeewantha

== Honours ==
- Premier Trophy
  - Winners: 1979–80, 1984–85, 1987–88, 1995–96, 2006–07, 2012, 2021
- Twenty20 Tournament
  - Winners (1)
- Major Clubs Limited Over Tournament
  - Winners (1): 2025

== Current squad ==
Players with international caps are listed in bold.

Name	Role	Notes
Batters
**Nishan Madushka**	WK Batter	
Pawan Sandesh	Batter	
**Pavan Rathnayake**	Batter	
Lasith Croospulle	Batter	
Anjala Bandara	WK Batter	
Sahan Kosala	Batter	
All-Rounders
**Kamindu Mendis**	All-Rounder	
**Sonal Dinusha**	All-Rounder	Captain
Chamindu Wijesinghe	All-Rounder	
**Dhananjaya de Silva**	All-Rounder	
**Wanindu Hasaranga**	All-Rounder	
Inuka Karannagoda	All-Rounder	
Ashen Bandara	All-Rounder	
Bowlers
**Lakshan Sandakan**	Spin Bowler	Head coach
**Isuru Udana**	Pace Bowler	
**Vishwa Fernando**	Pace Bowler	
**Nishan Peiris**	Bowler	
Duvindu Ranatunga	Bowler	
**Asitha Fernando**	Pace Bowler	
Thisaru Wanninayake	Bowler	
Dilum Sudeera	Bowler	
