= Moors Sports Club =

- Moors Sports Club

Personnel
- Captain: (Sri Lanka) Pasindu Sooriyabandara
- Coach: (Sri Lanka) Chamara Kapugedara

Team information
- City: Colombo
- Founded: 1908; 118 years ago
- Home ground: Moors Sports Club Ground

History
- No. of titles: 1
- Premier Trophy wins: 1
- Premier Limited Overs Tournament wins: 0
- Official website: www.moorssc.lk

Moors Sports Club is a first-class cricket team based in Colombo, Sri Lanka.

== History ==
Moors Sports Club was founded in 1908 by members of Colombo Grand Mosque at New Moor Street in the Colombo neighbourhood of Pettah. Like most clubs founded during the colonial era it was founded on ethno-religious lines and catered to the minority Moorish community. The club later moved to its present location at Muttiah Road in the neighbourhood of Slave Island. Sir Razik Fareed laid the foundation stone for a Club House on 25 September 1936 and Governor Sir Edward Stubbs declared open the pavilion on 27 February 1937. The first inter-club match at the venue was between the Moors SC and Kalutara Town Club. In 1983 the first professional players were contracted with the advent of professional cricket and the Sri Lanka national cricket team gaining Test status. In addition to cricket, other sports offered include tennis, basketball and billiards.

== Team records ==
- Playing Record : Played : 209 Won : 52 Lost : 43 Drawn : 114
- Highest team total – 652/8d vs Nugegoda SC, Colombo (Moors), 2020
- Best innings bowling figures – HMRKB Herath 8/43 vs PSC, Colombo (Moors) 2003–04
- Highest individual score – Ramesh Mendis 300* vs Negombo SC, Colombo (Moors) 2020
- Partnership records –
- 1st – 195 MNR Cooray & MS Sampan vs SSC, Colombo (CCC), 2001–02
- 2nd – 140 KD Gunawardene & DSNFG Jayasuriya vs Bloomfield Cricket and Athletic Club, Colombo (Bloom), 2011–12
- 3rd – 161 MI Ghouse & WMB Perera vs Tamil Union Cricket and Athletic Club, Colombo (PSS), 2011–12
- 4th – 222 S Kalavitigoda & PC de Silva vs Burgher Recreation Club, Colombo (Moors), 2010–11
- 5th – 260* MI Ghouse & LJP Gunaratne vs Colts Cricket Club, Colombo (Col), 2012–13
- 6th – 166 SI de Saram & LHD Dilhara vs Saracens Sports Club, Colombo (Moors), 2012–13
- 7th – 224 LJP Gunaratne & RS Wickramarachchi vs SLAF, Colombo (Moors), 2012–13
- 8th – 182 LHD Dilhara & HMRKB Herath vs NCC, Colombo (Moors), 2006–07
- 9th – 118* HMRKB Herath & PN Ranjith vs Galle Cricket Club, Colombo (Moors), 2002/03
- 10th – 96 UI Weerawarna & D Schaffter vs NCC, Colombo (NCC), 1994/95

Records current (as of 30 April 2013)

== Honours ==
- Premier Trophy (1) (2002–03)

== 2002–03 Championship ==
On 6 March 2003 Moors SC took on Bloomfield Cricket and Athletic Club in the Premier League final. Moors SC captain Rangana Herath won the toss and chose to field first. Bloomfield were dismissed for 121 with Nandika Ranjith taking 5 for 39. An unbeaten 62 from Amila Weththasinghe helped his side gain a 67-run first innings lead, having at one stage been at 5/96. Ranjith took another 5 wicket haul as Bloomfield were all out in their second inning for 172. This left Moors SC chasing 106 for their maiden trophy and after losing their first 4 wickets for just 16 they crawled home to win by 1 wicket. Bathiya Perera top scored with 31 and Thamara Abeyratne batting at number 9 was the hero with 25 not out.

The man of the match award went to Nandika Ranjith for his 10 wickets while Chandika Hathurusingha was named as player of the tournament.
