= Tamil Union Cricket and Athletic Club =

First-class cricket team based in Colombo, Sri Lanka

- Club crest

Personnel
- Captain: Tharindu Rathnayake
- Coach: Sachith Pathirana
- Chairman: Ramesh Schaffter

Team information
- City: Colombo
- Colours: Violet
- Founded: 2 December 1899; 126 years ago at Campbell Park, Colombo
- Home ground: Paikiasothy Saravanamuttu Stadium at Borella, Colombo 08
- Capacity: 15,000

History
- No. of titles: 6
- Premier Trophy wins: 2
- Premier Limited Overs Tournament wins: 2
- Twenty20 Tournament wins: 0
- Major Clubs Limited Over Tournament wins: 2
- Notable players: Muttiah Muralitharan; Tillakaratne Dilshan; Rangana Herath; Vijayakanth Viyaskanth
- Official website: tamilunioncricket.com

Tamil Union Cricket & Athletic Club is a first-class cricket team based in Colombo, Sri Lanka. They play their home games at P. Saravanamuttu Stadium.

== History ==
The club can trace its roots back to the final years of the 19th century in which two pre-existing rival clubs amalgamated to form the Tamil Union Cricket and Athletic Club. The club's embryonic years benefited from its stewardship by some of the country's most eminent Tamil Lawyers, Politicians and Civil Servants (see below). The first of these clubs was known as the Lanka Sports Club, which was established in 1895 had its base in Price Park. In 1898, the first available mention of office bearers lists D. Muthuswamy (president), G. N. C. Ponnambalam (secretary), future Speaker of the Parliament of Sri Lanka Sir Waithilingam Duraiswamy (club Captain) as the club committee. Duraiswamy would later hold the position of President (1937–48) while G.N.C Ponnambalam that of Captain (1905) in the amalgamated Tamil Union and Athletic Club. A second Tamil sports club was established in March 1899, in a meeting that was called with the objective of organising a second Tamil Sports Club in Colombo. This meeting was duly held at the City College Hall and presided over by the Hon. P. Coomaraswamy, former Member of the Legislative Council of Ceylon (forerunner of the Parliament of Sri Lanka). During the meeting the club elected its governing committee, which included Sir Ponnambalam Arunachalam member of the Legislative Council of Ceylon, Mr T Muttu Coomaraswamy, Mr A. E. Strong and Mr E. Sellayah. Sir Ponnambalam's elder brother Sir Ponnambalam Ramanathan, former Solicitor General of Sri Lanka later became President of the amalgamated Tamil Union Cricket and Athletic Club and was followed by Dr. E. V. Ratnam 1931–1937 while Mr E. Sellayah's eldest son (W.M.) Sri Lanka's first full-time Registrar of Companies, later became Honorary General Secretary, while another son (L.W.) went on to captain the Tamil Union Cricket and Athletic Club and All-Ceylon teams in hockey and later served as a national administrator.

By the end of 1899, the two rival Tamil clubs were persuaded to join forces, which resulted in the creation of the Tamil Union Cricket and Athletic Club, with T. Thirunavakarasu and Dr John Rockwood, the son of the eminent surgeon and member of the Legislative Council of Ceylon, Dr W. G. Rockwood serving as the first President and Honorary General Secretary, respectively. The sports grounds were based at Campbell Park in Borella wherein many sports were played including hockey, cricket, and athletics. In fact, for several decades between the 1930s and 1960s the Tamil Union Cricket and Athletic Club were one of the premier hockey clubs in the country and won many National tournaments including the Andriesz Shield and Pioneer Cup. This coincided with a time in which Sri Lankan hockey could compete ably with the best teams in the world. Since then, however, the hockey fortunes of both the club and National team have declined considerably, possibly due to the increasing popularity and financial resources aimed at the country's cricketing success.

Krishna Raja Wadiyar IV, the Maharaja of Mysore Kingdom in India was the first patron of the Tamil Union and served between 1923 and his death in 1940.

In 1935, the club celebrated its 35th anniversary in grand style with a carnival and sports meet that culminated in a garden party at Campbell Park. This was one of the final major events held by the club on this ground before relocation. The occasion was a great success and was well received and celebrated by patrons, politicians, sportsmen and businessmen from both Sinhalese and Tamil backgrounds. In 1937, the club acquired its new grounds and pavilion named the Colombo Oval, later renamed the Paikiasothy Saravanamuttu Stadium in honour of its Club stalwart for his tireless efforts in convince the Government to donate the grounds to the club. His Excellency Sir Reginald Edward Stubbs, the Governor of Ceylon officially opened the Colombo Oval on 27 January 1940. In the intervening years, Paikiasothy Saravanamuttu was instrumental in preparing the grounds to the standard of first class cricket, cultivating a superb playing area out of land that resembled a marshy swamp, with the kind assistance of the then Minister of Agriculture and Lands, Mr D.S. Senanayake (later the first Prime Minister of Sri Lanka). For his efforts, Mr Senanayake was named an honorary member of the Tamil Union.

Beginning in the 1960s, under the leadership of Somasunderam Skandakumar and Selva Perumal the club began to expand its base of cricketing talent by looking further afield than Colombo. This strategy paid dividends as the club soon began to nurture several young talents (many from extremely humble backgrounds) into international cricketers, including Upul Chandana. Perhaps the most illustrious international cricketer the club has produced is the leading wicket taker in international cricket history, Muttiah Muralitharan who amassed 800 Test wickets in 133 matches for Sri Lanka. Other notable players include former Sri Lankan Captain Tillakaratne Dilshan one of the all-time greats of Sri Lankan cricket, Mahadevan Sathasivam who captained the Tamil Union when it was first granted First-class cricket status and lead All-Ceylon in the 1940s before emigrating to Singapore to Captain its National Cricket Team, and Rangana Herath a world-class Spin bowler. Current Club captain is Chanaka Welegedara who has played 21 Test matches for Sri Lanka.

In 1981, Sri Lanka gained full member status of the International Cricket Council (ICC) and shortly thereafter played its first Test match at the headquarters of the Tamil Union, by this time renamed Paikiasothy Saravanamuttu Stadium. Mr T. Murugaser and Mr C. T. A. Schaffter were highly praised for their efforts in ensuring the occasion was a resounding success. Tragedy was to strike barely two years later, however, when the Oval was burned down during the 1983 riots during Black July. In spite of this the club was still able to host regular international cricket, including Sri Lanka's first ever Test match triumph over India in 1985.

From the mid-1990s the P. Saravanamuttu Oval saw a hiatus of International cricket due to expansive renovations and improvements in facilities at the ground. The new developments include a state of the art media centre, gym, pool, players dressing area, bar and lounge as well as new two- tiered stands named for prominent members of the club, Dr Ranjan Chanmugam, M.Sathasivam and Sathi Coomaraswamy, an All-Ceylon cricketer and son of C. Coomaraswamy, Sri Lankan High Commissioner to India. These facilities and the club's history, together with the successes of its cricket team (regularly winning BCCSL national tournaments) in recent years maintain the club's status as one of the foremost sports clubs in the country.

Since its inception, the Tamil Union Cricket and Athletic club would go on to have strong ties with the various governing bodies of national sport. For instance, Dr John Rockwood, the first honorary general secretary of the club also became the first president of the Ceylon Cricket Association. Paikiasothy Saravanamuttu, club president (1948–51) whose family were instrumental to the club's successes for several decades, was president of both the Ceylon Cricket Association and its successor the Board of Control for Cricket (1948–1950). W.M. Sellayah, honorary general secretary of the club (1932–36) also held the same position with the Ceylon Hockey Association and Ceylon Cricket Association. CTA Schafter a club captain and double international (played hockey and cricket) went on to be manager of the Sri Lankan Cricket team in the new millennium. In the 1980s, T. Murugaser, club president (1980–81) also held the vice presidency of the Board of Control for Cricket. Thus, the club has contributed a great deal to the administration of sport in Sri Lanka over the years.

== Honours ==
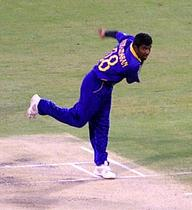
The club's most famous cricketer Muttiah Muralitharan

- Premier Trophy (3)

1945–46, 1950–51, 2015–16

- Premier Limited Overs Tournament (1)

1999–00

- Major Clubs Limited Over Tournament (2)

2021–22, 2022–23
