= Silva =

Origin
- Meaning: forest
- Region of origin: Portugal, Galicia

Other names
- Variant forms: da Silva, de Silva, d'Silva, e Silva, Silvea

Silva is a surname of Portuguese or Galician origin that is widespread in the Portuguese-speaking countries, including Brazil. It may derive from any of various places in Iberia named Silva, or else from the common noun silva, which means "bramble" in modern Portuguese but originally meant "forest".

The name is widespread in Galician-speaking regions of Spain (mostly in Galicia) and even more so in regions of the former Portuguese Empire in the Americas (being the most common surname in Brazil), in Africa and Asia, notably in India and Sri Lanka. It is also quite common in Spanish-speaking Latin America.

Movement of people has led to the name being used in many places. Due to emigration from Portuguese-speaking countries, Silva (other variant forms include: "da Silva", "de Silva", "d'Silva", "e Silva", "Silvea") is the fifth most common surname in the French department of Val-de-Marne, outside Paris, and it was the 19th most common family name given to newborns between 1966 and 1990 in France.

== Distribution of the surname Silva in Brazil ==
Location	Population	Population with the surname Silva	% of the population with the surname Silva
Acre	830,018	230,212	27.74%
Alagoas	3,127,683	1,118,138	35.75%
Amapá	733,759	125,176	17.06%
Amazonas	3,941,613	740,534	18.79%
Bahia	1,414,1626	2,487,204	17.59%
Ceará	8,794,957	1,692,868	19.25%
Distrito Federal	2,817,381	390,958	13.88%
Espírito Santo	3,833,712	449,433	11.72%
Goiás	7,056,495	1,200,731	17.02%
Maranhão	6,776,699	1,581,757	23.34%
Mato Grosso	3,658,649	651,323	17.80%
Mato Grosso do Sul	2,757,013	400,162	14.51%
Minas Gerais	20,539,989	3,162,886	15.40%
Pará	8,120,131	1,593,312	19.62%
Paraíba	3,974,687	1,120,148	28.18%
Paraná	11,444,380	1,136,394	9.93%
Pernambuco	9,058,931	3,100,715	34.23%
Piauí	3,271,199	771,651	23.59%
Rio de Janeiro	16,055,174	2,515,895	15.67%
Rio Grande do Norte	3,302,729	919,522	27.84%
Rio Grande do Sul	10,882,965	1,140,167	10.48%
Rondônia	1,581,196	256,795	16.24%
Roraima	636,707	125,828	19.76%
Santa Catarina	7,610,361	613,075	8.06%
São Paulo	44,411,238	5,928,587	13.35%
Sergipe	2,210,004	288,151	13.04%
Tocantins	1,511,460	288,482	19.09%
Brazil	203,080,756	34,030,104	16.76%

In the North Region, the surname Silva is very widespread, with significant percentages in all states. In Acre, more than a quarter of the population (27.74%) bears this surname, while in Amazonas and Amapá the percentages are 18.79% and 17.06%, respectively. High values are also recorded in Pará (19.62%), Rondônia (16.24%), Roraima (19.76%), and Tocantins (19.09%), confirming a strong presence of the surname in the northern part of Brazil, where there are more than 3.2 million people named Silva in total.

In the Northeast Region, the surname Silva reaches some of the highest percentages in Brazil. The states with the greatest concentration are Alagoas (35.75%) and Pernambuco (34.23%), followed by Paraíba (28.18%) and Rio Grande do Norte (27.84%). In Maranhão and Piauí, approximately one in every four inhabitants is a Silva (23.34% and 23.59%, respectively), while in Bahia, the most populous state in the region, there are more than 2.4 million people with this surname (17.59%). These figures indicate that the Northeast represents the true historical and cultural epicenter of the Silva surname in Brazil.

In the Central-West Region, the surname maintains a significant presence, though with slightly lower percentages. In Goiás, 17.02% of the population bears the surname Silva, while in Mato Grosso and Mato Grosso do Sul the percentages are 17.80% and 14.51%. In the Federal District, 13.88% of residents are Silva. Altogether, nearly 2.6 million inhabitants of the Central-West share this surname.

In the Southeast Region, the most populous in the country, the surname Silva remains one of the most common, although with more moderate percentages compared to the Northeast. In Minas Gerais, 3.1 million people (15.40%) bear the surname; in São Paulo, Brazil's largest state, the number exceeds 5.9 million (13.35%). In Rio de Janeiro, 2.5 million inhabitants (15.67%) share the surname, while in Espírito Santo the proportion is 11.72%. Altogether, around 12.5 million people named Silva live in the Southeast Region.

In the South Region, the percentages are the lowest, but the surname remains among the most widespread. In Paraná, nearly 1.1 million people (9.93%) are Silva, while in Rio Grande do Sul the percentage reaches 10.48%. In Santa Catarina, however, only 8.06% of the population bears this surname—the lowest proportion in Brazil. Altogether, the South Region has around 2.3 million inhabitants with the surname Silva.

At the national level, the surname Silva is the most common in all of Brazil, with 34,030,104 people, representing 16.76% of the total population. Its distribution across all regions reflects the Portuguese origins of the surname and its deep roots in Brazil's history and demographic formation. In practice, approximately one in every six Brazilians bears the surname Silva, making it a distinctive symbol of national identity.

== Arts ==
=== Actors ===
- Adele Silva (born 1980), British actress
- António Silva (actor) (1886–1971), Portuguese actor
- Deepani Silva, Sri Lankan actress
- Douglas Silva (born 1988), Brazilian actor
- Fernando Ramos da Silva (1967–1987), Brazilian actor
- Frank Silva (1950–1995), American actor and set dresser
- Freddie Silva (1938–2001), Sri Lankan actor, comedian, and playback singer
- Gertrudes Rita da Silva (1825–1888), Portuguese actor
- Henry Silva (1926–2022), American actor
- Howard da Silva (1909–1986), American actor and director
- Sadiris Master (died 1958), Sri Lankan Sinhalese actor and musician
- Hilarion "Larry" Silva (1937–2004), Filipino actor, comedian, and politician
- Leena de Silva (born 1936), Sri Lankan Sinhala actress
- Leslie Silva (born 1968), American actress
- Nicole da Silva (born 1981), Australian actress
- Palitha Silva (born 1967), Sri Lankan actor
- Paulo Rogério da Silva (born 1970), Brazilian actor also known as Gero Camilo
- Rafael L. Silva (born 1994), Brazilian-American actor
- Roy de Silva (1937–2018), Sri Lankan Sinhalese actor and film director
- Sanjit De Silva (born 1976), Sri Lankan American actor and director
- Simone Silva (1928–1957), Egyptian-born French film actress, also briefly in British films

=== Musicians ===
- Da Silva (singer) (born 1976), French singer and songwriter
- Alan Silva (born 1939), American free jazz double bassist
- Amancio D'Silva (1936–1996), Indian jazz guitarist and composer
- Andrew De Silva, Sri Lankan Australian R&B and musician
- Dawn Silva, American funk vocalist
- Deepal Silva (1967–2017), Sri Lankan Sinhalese playback singer and actor
- Desmond de Silva (singer) (1944–2022), Sri Lankan vocalist
- Francisco Manuel da Silva (1795–1865), Brazilian composer and music professor
- Henry Silva (1926–2022), Cape Verdean band leader and singer
- Humberto Rodríguez Silva (1908–1952), Cuban composer and judge
- Horace Silver (1928–2014), American jazz pianist, composer, and bandleader
- Luis Silva (1943–2008), American Tejano songwriter
- Lúcio Silva da Souza, known artistically as Silva (musician), Brazilian singer-songwriter and multi-instrumentalist
- Mac Silva (1947–1989), Aboriginal Australian musician, who appeared in the film Country Outcasts
- Natalia Lafourcade Silva (born 1984), Mexican singer and musician
- Rui da Silva (DJ) (born 1968), Portuguese DJ
- Stuart de Silva, Sri Lankan Australian jazz pianist
- Virajini Lalithya de Silva (born 1973), Sri Lankan Sinhalese vocalist
- Vivienne de Silva Boralessa (1930–2017), Sri Lankan vocalist
- Yohani Diloka de Silva, Sri Lankan singer, songwriter, and music producer

=== Painters and sculptors ===
- António Carvalho de Silva Porto (1850–1893), Portuguese naturalist painter
- Diego Rodríguez de Silva y Velázquez (Diego Velázquez), Spanish painter
- Francis Augustus Silva (1835–1886), American painter
- Manuel Pereira da Silva (1920–2003), Portuguese sculptor
- Marilyn da Silva (born 1952), American metalsmith
- Maria Helena Vieira da Silva (1908–1992), Portuguese painter
- William Posey Silva (1859–1948), American painter

=== Writers ===
First name

- Silva Kaputikyan (1919–2006), Armenian poet, writer, academician, and public activist

Surname

- Alfreda de Silva (1920–2001), Sri Lankan Sinhala poet, journalist, and screenwriter
- António Diniz da Cruz e Silva (1731–1799), Portuguese heroic-comic poet
- António José da Silva (1705–1739), eighteenth-century Brazilian Converso playwright known as "The Jew"
- Arménio Adroaldo Vieira e Silva (Arménio Vieira) (born 1941), Portuguese journalist
- Baltasar Lopes da Silva, Cape Verdean writer
- Daniel Silva (novelist), American author
- John de Silva, Sri Lankan Sinhalese playwright
- José Gabriel Lopes da Silva (Gabriel Mariano), Cape Verdean poet and essayist
- Joseph Silva, a pseudonym of American author Ron Goulart
- Luís Filipe Silva, Portuguese writer
- Nihal De Silva, Sri Lankan Sinhalese novelist
- Sugathapala de Silva, Sri Lankan Sinhalese dramatist, novelist, radio play producer, and translator
- Víctor Domingo Silva, Chilean poet, journalist, playwright, and writer
- W. A. Silva, Sri Lankan Sinhalese novelist
- Wilson da Silva, Australian/Portuguese science writer, editor, and filmmaker

=== Other arts ===
- Ena de Silva, re-established Sri Lanka's batik industry
- Ingrid Silva, Brazilian ballet dancer
- Maria José Marques da Silva, Portuguese architect
- Minnette de Silva, Sri Lankan Sinhalese architect

== Historical figures ==
- Bernardo Peres da Silva, the first and only native Goan governor of Portuguese India
- Lucius Flavius Silva, Roman governor of Judea who crushed Jewish resistance at Masada in 73 AD
- José Joaquim da Silva Xavier (1746–1792), known as Tiradentes, Brazilian independence leader
- Mariana de Silva-Bazán y Sarmiento (1739–1784), Spanish aristocrat, writer, painter, and translator
- Pedro da Silva (post courier), first post courier of Canada (17th–18th century)
- Ruy Gómez de Silva (1516–1573), nobleman and cousin of Philip II of Spain

== Judiciary ==
- Eurico da Silva (1933–2025), Indian judge of the High Court of Bombay
- Janak de Silva, Sri Lankan puisne justice of the Supreme Court (since 2020)

== Media ==
- Chantal Da Silva, Canadian journalist working in the United Kingdom
- Dayananda de Silva, Sri Lankan Sinhalese radio journalist at Radio Ceylon
- João Silva (photographer), South African photographer
- Martin Silva, Portuguese-Canadian politician and radio personality
- Sampath Lakmal de Silva, Sri Lankan Sinhalese journalist specializing in defense issues
- Tatiana Silva Braga Tavares, Belgian model, Miss Belgium 2005
- Tom Silva, general contractor on the PBS show This Old House
- Thotawatte Don Manuel Titus de Silva, known as Titus Thotawatte, Sri Lankan director and editor
- Yohani Diloka de Silva, Sri Lankan singer-songwriter, rapper, record producer, and YouTuber

== Political and military figures ==
- Alexander Edmund de Silva Wijegooneratne Samaraweera Rajapakse (1866–1937), Sri Lankan Sinhala politician
- Amaro Silva, municipal politician in Winnipeg (Manitoba), Canada
- Ana Lúcia Silva de Passos (born 1967), Portuguese politician and biologist
- Aníbal Cavaco Silva, President of Portugal
- A. E. Silva, Sri Lankan Tamil Member of Parliament
- António Maria da Silva, Portuguese politician
- Artur da Costa e Silva, Brazilian military officer and politician
- Asoka de Silva (Admiral), 9th Commander of the Sri Lanka Navy
- Asoka de Silva, 42nd Chief Justice of Sri Lanka
- Benedita da Silva, Brazilian politician
- C. A. Mike N. Silva (1933–2019), Chief of Staff of the Sri Lanka Army
- Charles Percival de Silva, Sri Lankan Sinhalese politician
- Charles de Silva Batuwantudawe (1877–1940), Sri Lankan Sinhala lawyer and politician
- Chitta Ranjan De Silva, Sri Lankan Sinhalese lawyer, Chairman of the Lessons Learnt and Reconciliation Commission, 40th Attorney General of Sri Lanka, 39th Solicitor General of Sri Lanka
- Claude Henry de Silva, Singaporean lawyer
- Colvin Reginald de Silva, Sri Lankan Sinhalese Trotskyist Member of Parliament, Cabinet Minister of Plantation Industries and Constitutional Affairs
- Crishantha de Silva, 21st Commander of the Sri Lanka Army
- Desmond Lorenz de Silva, Sri Lankan Briton lawyer, former United Nations Chief War Crimes Prosecutor in Sierra Leone
- D. G. Albert de Silva, Sri Lankan Sinhalese Member of Parliament
- Duleep de Silva Wickramanayake, Sri Lankan Sinhala army major-general
- Duminda Silva, Sri Lankan politician
- Estanislau da Silva, East Timorese politician and member of the Revolutionary Front for an Independent East Timor
- Eunice Silva, Cape Verdean civil engineer and politician
- Francisco de Paula Vieira da Silva de Tovar, 1st Viscount of Molelos, Portuguese politician
- Frank de Silva (born 1935), Inspector-General of Sri Lanka Police from 1993 to 1995
- Fredrick de Silva, Sri Lankan Sinhalese lawyer and politician
- Gardiye Punchihewage Amaraseela Silva, 34th Chief Justice of Sri Lanka
- George E. de Silva, Sri Lankan Sinhalese lawyer and politician
- G.E.S. de Silva, commanding officer of the Sri Lanka Volunteer Naval Force
- G. H. De Silva, 13th Commander of the Sri Lanka Army
- Golbery do Couto e Silva, Brazilian politician
- G. P. S. de Silva, 40th Chief Justice of Sri Lanka
- George Reginald de Silva, Sri Lankan Sinhalese politician
- Gratian Silva (1933–2015), Sri Lankan Sinhala army major general
- Guto Silva (born 1977), Brazilian politician
- H. A. Silva, 11th Commander of the Sri Lanka Navy
- Hélio José da Silva Lima (born 1960), Brazilian politician known as Hélio José
- Herman Leonard de Silva, Sri Lankan Sinhalese lawyer and diplomat, 12th Permanent Representative of Sri Lanka to the United Nations in New York
- Israel Pinheiro da Silva, Brazilian politician and engineer
- Jaime Silva, former Minister of Agriculture, Rural Development and Fisheries of Portugal
- Jayatilleke De Silva (1938–2019), Sri Lankan Sinhala Communist guerrilla
- Jim Silva, American politician
- José Albino Silva Peneda, Portuguese politician
- José Bonifácio de Andrada e Silva, Brazilian activist
- K. L. A. Ranasinghe Silva, 41st Surveyor General of Sri Lanka
- Leopold James de Silva Seneviratne, Sri Lankan Sinhala civil servant
- Lucien Macull Dominic de Silva (1893–1962), Sri Lankan Sinhala member of the Privy Council
- Luís Alves de Lima e Silva, Duke of Caxias, Brazilian military commander
- Luís da Silva Mouzinho de Albuquerque, Portuguese politician
- Luis Roberto da Sliva (born 1977), East Timorese politician
- Luiz Inácio Lula da Silva, current President of Brazil
- Lydia Méndez Silva, Puerto Rican politician affiliated with the Popular Democratic Party
- Makalandage Johnny Terrence De Silva Gunawardena, 8th Commander of the Sri Lanka Air Force
- Manikku Wadumestri Hendrick de Silva, 26th Attorney General of Sri Lanka
- Manuel António Vassalo e Silva, Portuguese politician
- Manuel Carvalho da Silva, coordinator of the Portuguese Labour union federation
- Marina Silva, Brazilian environmentalist and politician
- Mario Silva, Canadian politician
- Mónica Esther Silva, Argentine politician
- Nelson Silva (born 1985), Portuguese politician
- Osmund de Silva, 13th Inspector General of the Sri Lanka Police
- Pandikoralalage Sunil Chandra De Silva, 35th Attorney General of Sri Lanka
- Patrick de Silva Kularatna, Sri Lankan Sinhalese politician and educationist
- Pete Silva, American politician
- Pettagan Dedreck Weerasingha de Silva, Sri Lankan Sinhalese Member of Parliament
- Mervin Rex de Silva, Sri Lankan Sinhalese fighter pilot who served in the Royal Air Force during World War II
- Mervyn Silva, Sri Lankan Sinhalese politician
- Mohan Priyadarshana De Silva, Sri Lankan Sinhalese Member of Parliament for Galle Electoral District
- Nilenthi Nimal Siripala de Silva, Sri Lankan Sinhalese politician, Sri Lankan Minister of Transport
- Peduru Hewage William de Silva, Sri Lankan Sinhalese Trotskyist politician, Cabinet Minister of Industries and Fisheries 1956–1959
- Piyal De Silva, Commander of the Sri Lanka Navy
- Piyal Nishantha de Silva (born 1970), Sri Lankan Sinhala Cabinet Minister
- Ranjith de Silva, Sri Lanka Light Infantry major-general
- Rupika De Silva, Sri Lankan Sinhala women's rights and peace activist
- Sampathawaduge Stephen Anthony Silva, Sri Lankan Sinhalese Member of Parliament
- Sarah Silva, American politician from New Mexico
- Sarath N. Silva, 41st Chief Justice of Sri Lanka
- Shan Wijayalal De Silva, 5th Chief Minister of Southern Province, Sri Lanka
- Sharon Quirk-Silva (born 1962), American politician
- Shavendra Silva, Sri Lankan Sinhalese general and diplomat
- Sonia Silva, American politician
- Stephen de Silva Jayasinghe (1911–1977), Sri Lankan Sinhala politician
- Thakur Artha Niranjan Joseph De Silva Deva Aditya (born 1948), Sri Lankan Briton politician
- Vicente Paulo da Silva (born 1956), Brazilian politician
- T. N. De Silva, former Commandant of the Sri Lanka Army Volunteer Force
- Vincent Stuart de Silva Wikramanayake (1876–1953), Sri Lankan Sinhala lawyer and politician
- Wilmot Arthur de Silva, Sri Lankan Sinhalese politician, veterinary surgeon, and philanthropist, Minister of Health in the second State Council of Ceylon
- Walwin Arnold de Silva, Sri Lankan Sinhalese civil servant

== Religion ==
- Saint Beatrice of Silva, Portuguese Dominican nun
- Clarence Richard Silva, United States Catholic bishop
- Hezekiah da Silva, Jewish author born in Livorno, Italy, and teacher in Jerusalem
- Blessed João Mendes de Silva (Amadeus of Portugal), Portuguese Hieronymite and later Franciscan
- Kanishka de Silva Raffel (born 1964), Sri Lankan Australian Anglican priest, 12th Dean of St Andrew's Cathedral, Sydney
- Lynn de Silva, Sri Lankan Methodist theologian
- Maxwell Silva, Sri Lankan Sinhala Catholic priest, Auxiliary Bishop of the Archdiocese of Colombo
- Raúl Silva Henríquez, Chilean cardinal of the Roman Catholic Church
- Robert D'Silva, Pakistani Catholic priest

== Scholars ==
- Agostinho da Silva (1906–1994), Portuguese philosopher
- Arjuna Priyadarsin de Silva, Sri Lankan Sinhalese gastroenterologist
- Chandra Richard de Silva, Sri Lankan Sinhalese academic, historian, and author
- Clarence de Silva, Canadian engineer
- Dudley Kenneth George de Silva, Sri Lankan Sinhalese educationist
- Harendra de Silva, Sri Lankan Sinhalese pediatrician
- H. Janaka de Silva, Sri Lankan Sinhalese physician
- Jayathi De Silva, Sri Lankan scientist and model
- Jorge Nuno Silva (born 1956), Portuguese mathematician
- José Sebastião e Silva, Portuguese mathematician
- Kingsley De Silva, Sri Lankan obstetrician and gynaecologist
- Kingsley Muthumuni de Silva, Sri Lankan Sinhalese academic, historian, and author
- Kongahage Anslem Lawrence de Silva (born 1940), Sri Lankan Sinhala biologist and herpetologist
- Maria Nazareth F. da Silva, Brazilian zoologist
- Maurício Rocha e Silva (1910–1983), Brazilian physician
- Mohan De Silva (physician), Sri Lankan Sinhalese surgeon
- Moisés Silva, Cuban-born American professor of biblical studies
- Nalin de Silva, Sri Lankan Scholar
- Primus Thilakaratne de Silva, Sri Lankan Sinhalese senior consultant physician
- Ranjith Premalal De Silva, Sri Lankan Sinhalese professor of agricultural engineering
- Sammu Raghu De Silva Chandrakeerthy, Sri Lankan Sinhalese engineering professor
- Sembukuttiarachilage Ravi Pradip Silva (born 1969), Sri Lankan-British professor
- Shanaka L de Silva, Sri Lankan British-American geologist
- Vajiranath Lakshman De Silva, Sri Lankan Sinhalese doctor, founder of the Saukyadana Movement
- Alcino J. Silva, Portugal-born American neuroscientist

== Sports ==
Many people on this list are not generally known as Silva.

=== Auto racing ===
- Ayrton Senna da Silva, also known as Ayrton Senna or Senna, Brazilian Formula One triple world champion
- Hermano da Silva Ramos (1925–2026), French-Brazilian racing driver
- Ollie Silva, American automobile racer

=== Basketball ===
- Chris Silva (Chris Silva Obame Correia; born 1996), Gabonese player in the Israeli Basketball Premier League
- Filipe da Silva, Portuguese player
- Maria Paula Silva, Brazilian player
- Oscar da Silva (born 1998), German basketball player
- Paulo César da Silva or Giant Silva (born 1962), Brazilian national player, later wrestler and mixed martial artist
- Tristan da Silva (born 2001), Brazilian-German basketball player

=== Beach volleyball ===
- Jackie Silva, Brazilian beach volleyball player
- Paulo Emilio Silva, Brazilian beach volleyball player

=== Cricket ===
- Ajit de Silva, Sri Lankan Sinhalese cricketer
- Alankara Asanka Silva, Sri Lankan Sinhalese cricketer
- Amal Silva, Sri Lankan Sinhalese cricketer
- Aravinda De Silva, Sri Lankan international cricketer
- Aruna de Silva, Sri Lankan Sinhalese first-class cricketer
- Ashen Silva, Sri Lankan Sinhalese first-class cricketer
- Ashley de Silva, Sri Lankan international cricketer
- Asoka de Silva (cricketer), Sri Lankan international cricketer
- Bertie de Silva, Sri Lankan Sinhalese cricketer who played for the University of Oxford
- Chalana de Silva, Sri Lankan Sinhalese cricketer
- Chamara Silva, Sri Lankan international cricketer
- Chaturanga de Silva, Sri Lankan Sinhalese cricketer
- Chirantha de Silva, Sri Lankan Sinhalese cricketer
- Damitha Silva, Sri Lankan Sinhalese cricketer
- Dedunu Silva, Sri Lankan Sinhalese cricketer
- Dhananjaya de Silva, Sri Lankan Sinhalese cricketer
- Gamini Silva, Sri Lankan Sinhalese cricketer
- Ganga de Silva, Sri Lankan Sinhalese woman cricketer
- Gayan Silva, Sri Lankan Sinhalese cricketer
- Gayan de Silva (Bahraini cricketer), Sri Lankan Sinhalese Bahraini cricketer
- Gayan de Silva (Sri Lankan cricketer, born 1988), Sri Lankan Sinhalese cricketer
- Granville de Silva, Sri Lankan Sinhalese cricketer
- Gayashan Munasinghe, Sri Lankan Italian cricketer
- Gihan De Silva, Sri Lankan Sinhalese cricketer
- Hasitha Lakmal de Silva, Sri Lankan Sinhalese cricketer
- Janith Silva, Sri Lankan Sinhalese cricketer
- Jayantha Silva, Sri Lankan Sinhalese cricketer
- Joshua Da Silva, Trinidadian cricketer
- Kasun de Silva, Sri Lankan Sinhalese cricketer
- Kaushal Silva, Sri Lankan Sinhalese test cricketer
- Lakshitha de Silva, Sri Lankan Sinhalese cricketer
- Lanka de Silva, Sri Lankan Sinhalese cricketer
- Liyana de Silva, Sri Lankan Sinhalese cricketer
- Mahela de Silva Jayawardena, Sri Lankan Sinhalese cricketer
- Malinga de Silva, Sri Lankan Sinhalese cricketer
- Manelker De Silva, Sri Lankan Sinhalese cricketer
- Martin de Silva, Sri Lankan Sinhalese cricketer
- Milroy Silva, Sri Lankan Sinhalese cricketer
- Nadhula de Silva, Sri Lankan Sinhalese cricketer
- Nilakshi de Silva, Sri Lankan Sinhalese cricketer
- Nilan De Silva, Sri Lankan Sinhalese cricketer
- Pradeep de Silva (cricketer, born 1989), Sri Lankan Sinhalese cricketer
- Pradeep de Silva (Nomads Sports Club cricketer), Sri Lankan Sinhalese cricketer
- Premachandra de Silva, Sri Lankan Sinhalese cricketer
- Ramindu de Silva, Sri Lankan Sinhalese cricketer
- Ranjan Silva, Sri Lankan Sinhalese cricketer
- Rashmi Silva (born 2000), Sri Lankan Sinhala cricketer
- Roshen Silva, Sri Lankan Sinhalese test cricketer
- Roy Silva, Sri Lankan Sinhalese cricketer
- Rumesh Silva, Sri Lankan Sinhalese cricketer
- Sajeewa de Silva, Sri Lankan Sinhalese cricketer
- Sanath de Silva, Sri Lankan Sinhalese cricketer
- Sanjeewa Silva, Sri Lankan Sinhalese cricketer
- Senal de Silva, Sri Lankan Sinhalese cricketer
- Shadeep Silva, Sri Lankan Sinhalese cricketer
- Shaluka Silva, Sri Lankan Sinhalese cricketer
- Somachandra de Silva (1942–2025), Sri Lankan Sinhalese international cricketer
- Sripal Silva, Sri Lankan Sinhalese cricketer
- Stanley de Silva, Sri Lankan Sinhalese ODI cricketer
- T. Silva, Sri Lankan Sinhalese cricketer
- Thikshila de Silva, Sri Lankan Sinhalese cricketer
- Wanindu Hasaranga De Silva, Sri Lankan Sinhalese cricketer
- Weddikkara Ruwan Sujeewa de Silva, Sri Lankan Sinhalese test cricketer
- Woshantha Silva, Sri Lankan Sinhalese cricketer
- Yohan de Silva, Sri Lankan Sinhalese first-class cricketer

=== Football ===
==== Brazil ====
Male international players

- Afonso Guimarães da Silva, Afonsinho
- Alexandre da Silva Mariano
- Alexandre Rodrigues da Silva, Alexandre Pato
- Cleonésio Carlos da Silva
- Dani Alves, Daniel Alves da Silva
- Danilo Luiz da Silva, Danilo
- Gabriel Teodoro Martinelli Silva
- Geovani Silva
- Gilberto Silva
- Gilberto da Silva Melo
- Giovanni Silva de Oliveira
- Heurelho da Silva Gomes, Heurelho Gomes
- Jackson Coelho Silva
- João Alves de Assis Silva, Jô
- Jorge Luís Andrade da Silva
- José Roberto da Silva Júnior, Zé Roberto
- Leônidas da Silva
- Lucimar Ferreira da Silva, Lúcio
- Lucas Rodrigues Moura da Silva, Lucas Moura
- Luiz Alberto da Silva Oliveira
- Marcelo Vieira da Silva Junior, Marcelo
- Mauro Silva, Mauro da Silva Gomes
- Nélson de Jesus Silva, Dida (footballer born 1973)
- Neymar, Neymar da Silva Santos Júnior
- Nilmar Honorato da Silva, Nilmar
- Oscarino Costa Silva
- Roberto Carlos da Silva Rocha, Roberto Carlos
- Rodrygo Silva de Goes
- Sean de Silva
- Thiago Emiliano da Silva, Thiago Silva
- Willian, Willian Borges da Silva

Female international players

- Cristiane Rozeira de Souza Silva
- Kátia, Kátia Cilene Teixeira da Silva
- Marta (footballer), Marta Vieira da Silva
- Thaís Helena da Silva

Others

- Adaílton da Silva Santos
- Adriano Pereira da Silva
- Aílton Gonçalves da Silva
- Airton Ferreira da Silva (Airton Pavilhão)
- Alan Osório da Costa Silva
- Ana Paula Pereira da Silva Villela
- André Luiz Silva do Nascimento
- Antônio da Silva (footballer)
- David da Silva
- Deivson Rogério da Silva (Bobô (footballer, born 1985))
- Diego da Silva Costa
- Elisérgio da Silva (Serginho Baiano)
- Elpídio Silva
- Fábio da Silva Alves
- Fábio do Nascimento Silva
- Fábio Ferreira da Silva
- Fábio Pereira da Silva
- Hugo Veloso Oliveira Silva
- Jefferson Teixeira Silva (Jefferson Luis)
- Johnathan Aparecido da Silva
- José Fábio da Silva
- Josualdo Alves da Silva Oliveira
- Lauro Antonio Ferreira da Silva
- Lucenilde Pereira da Silva
- Luciano José Pereira da Silva
- Luís Cláudio Carvalho da Silva
- Manoel de Oliveira da Silva Júnior
- Marcos Roberto da Silva Barbosa
- Marcus Lima Silva
- Michael Anderson Pereira da Silva
- Otacilio Jales da Silva
- Paulo Sérgio Oliveira da Silva
- Rafael Pereira da Silva, footballer, born 1980
- Rafael Pereira da Silva, footballer, born 1990
- Renan Teixeira da Silva
- Sérgio Severino da Silva
- Tiago Silva dos Santos
- Ueslei Raimundo Pereira da Silva
- Vitor Silva Assis de Oliveira Júnior (Vitor Júnior)
- Wender Coelho da Silva (Teco (footballer))
- Wéverton Pereira da Silva
- William da Silva Barbosa

==== Colombia ====
- Jaime Silva
- Nelson Silva Pacheco

==== Croatia ====
- Eduardo da Silva

==== England ====
- Jay Dasilva

==== Equatorial Guinea ====
- Emmanuel Danilo Clementino Silva (Danilo Clementino)

==== France ====
- Damien Da Silva, French footballer

==== Paraguay ====
- Anthony Domingo Silva
- Paulo da Silva

==== Portugal ====
- Adrien Silva
- André Miguel Valente da Silva (André Silva, born 1995)
- André Filipe Teixeira da Silva (André Silva (2000–2025))
- Anthony da Silva
- António Conceição da Silva Oliveira
- Bernardo Silva, Bernardo Mota Veiga de Carvalho e Silva
- Carlos da Silva
- Diogo José Teixeira da Silva (Diogo Jota)
- Jose Bosingwa Da Silva
- Daniel da Silva Soares
- David Mendes da Silva
- Edson Rolando Silva Sousa
- Eusébio da Silva Ferreira
- José Carlos da Silva José
- José Manuel da Silva Fernandes (Zé Manel (footballer))
- João Nuno da Silva Cardoso Lucas (João Lucas)
- João Paulo da Silva Gouveia Morais
- José Paulo Sousa da Silva
- João Pedro da Silva Pereira (João Pereira (Portuguese footballer))
- Lourenço da Silva (Luís Lourenço)
- Marco Silva, Marco Alexandre Saraiva da Silva
- Mário Silva (footballer)
- Paulo da Silva (Paulo César da Silva Barrios)
- Paulo Monteiro (Paulo Armando da Silva Monteiro)
- Ricardo Emídio Ramalho Silva

==== Spain ====
- Alfonso Silva
- David Silva, David Josué Jiménez Silva
- Donato Gama da Silva
- Fernando Macedo da Silva

==== Sri Lanka ====
- Anton Silva
- Dillon De Silva (born 2002), Sinhala footballer

==== Uruguay ====
- Bruno Silva (footballer, born 1980)
- Darío Silva
- Martín Silva
- Néstor Silva
- Pablo Silva
- Santiago Silva (footballer, born 1980)

=== Managers and referees ===
- Carlos Silva Valente, Portuguese football referee
- Fred Silva, United States American football official
- Telê Santana da Silva, Brazilian football manager
- Vanderlei Luxemburgo da Silva, Brazilian football coach

=== Martial arts ===
- Anderson Silva, Brazilian mixed martial artist
- Antônio Silva (fighter), Brazilian mixed martial artist
- Assuério Silva, Brazilian mixed martial artist
- Edinanci Silva, Brazilian judoka
- Erick Silva, Brazilian mixed martial artist
- Giant Silva (Paulo César da Silva), Brazilian mixed martial artist
- Jay Silva, Angolan-born American mixed martial artist
- Jussier da Silva, Brazilian mixed martial artist
- Natália Falavigna da Silva, Brazilian taekwondo athlete
- Nauana Silva, Brazilian judoka
- Thiago Silva (fighter), Brazilian mixed martial artist
- Wanderlei Silva, Brazilian mixed martial artist

=== Track and field ===
- Adhemar da Silva, Brazilian athlete
- Álvaro Silva (athlete) (1965–2025), Portuguese sprinter
- Anísio Silva, Brazilian triple jumper
- Carlos Silva (hurdler) (born 1974), Portuguese hurdler
- Fábio Gomes da Silva, pole vaulter
- Fátima Silva, Portuguese long-distance runner
- Germán Silva, Mexican long-distance runner
- Jani Chathurangani Chandra Silva Hondamuni, Sri Lankan Sinhalese sprinter
- Joaquim Silva (athlete), Portuguese long-distance runner
- Joseildo da Silva, Brazilian long-distance runner
- Osmiro Silva, Brazilian long-distance runner
- Pedro da Silva (decathlete), Brazilian decathlete
- Robson da Silva, Brazilian sprinter
- Rui Silva (athlete), Portuguese Olympic athlete
- Vânia Silva, Portuguese hammer thrower

=== Other sports ===
- Carlos Silva (baseball), Venezuelan baseball player
- Chandrika de Silva, Sri Lankan badminton player
- Cherantha de Silva, Sri Lankan Sinhalese swimmer
- Daniel Silva (golfer), Portuguese golfer
- Eden Silva, Sri Lankan Briton tennis player
- Emanuel Silva, Portuguese flatwater canoeist
- Eurico Rosa da Silva, Brazilian-born Canadian jockey
- Fabiola da Silva, Brazilian inline skater
- Frederico Ferreira Silva, Portuguese tennis player
- Gaël Da Silva, French gymnast
- Garth da Silva, New Zealand boxer
- Jamie Silva, American football safety
- Jason Silva, American rock climber
- John da Silva, New Zealand wrestler and boxer
- Luis Cardoso da Silva, Brazilian paracanoeist
- Luís Mena e Silva, Portuguese horse rider
- Neuza Silva, Portuguese tennis player
- Raquel Silva, Brazilian volleyball player
- Roberto Silva Nazzari, Uruguayan chess master
- Rogério Dutra Silva, Brazilian tennis player

== Other professions ==
- A. E. de Silva, Sri Lankan businessman
- Eugenia Silva, Spanish model
- Sir Ernest de Silva, Sri Lankan Sinhalese business magnate, banker, and barrister
- George David Silva, Sri Lankan Sinhalese Australian mass murderer
- João Marques Silva, Portuguese researcher
- José da Silva Pais, Portuguese soldier
- Kamaj Silva (born 1983), Sri Lankan Sinhala entrepreneur
- Moises Teixeira da Silva, Brazilian robber
- Palmira Silva, British murder victim
- Riccardo Silva (born 1970), Italian businessman
- Stella de Silva (1918–2012), paediatrician from Sri Lanka
- Steven Silva, American chef
- Nalin de Silva, Sri Lankan Sinhalese promoter of pseudoscience
- Jean Charles da Silva e de Menezes, known as Jean Charles de Menezes, Brazilian man killed by British police in 2005

== Fictional characters ==
- Silva (Shaman King), a character in Shaman King
- Silva, a mystical speaking necklace in GARO
- Goodness and Lucky Silva, characters in Marvel Comics
- Kristen De Silva, protagonist in Child's Play 3, played by Perrey Reeves
- Noelle Silva, a character in Black Clover
- Octavio Silva, a playable character known as Octane in Apex Legends
- Raoul Silva, the antagonist of the James Bond film Skyfall
- Rose da Silva, Christopher da Silva and Sharon da Silva, fictional characters in the film Silent Hill

== See also ==
Name disambiguation pages

- Alexandre da Silva (disambiguation)
- Daniel Silva (disambiguation)
- Fábio Silva (disambiguation)
- Tomás Silva (disambiguation)
- Washington Silva (disambiguation)

More specific surname disambiguation pages

- Alves da Silva
- Pereira da Silva
- Silva Oliveira and Oliveira Silva

== Bibliography ==
- BOUZA ZERRANO, José. Da Descendência de Don Francisco Prieto Gayoso. Edição do Autor, 1ª Edição, Lisboa, 1980.
- COROMINES, Joan. Onomasticon Cataloniæ (vol. I-VIII). Barcelona: 1994.
- SOUSA, Manuel de. As origens dos apelidos das famílias portuguesas. Sporpress, 2001.
- TÁVORA, D. Luis de Lancastre e. Dicionário das Famílias Portuguesas. Quetzal Editores, 2ª Edição, Lisboa, pág. 324.
