= Lakshitha =

Lakshitha is both a given name and a surname. Notable people with the name include:

- Lakshitha Madushan (born 1992), Sri Lankan cricketer
- Lakshitha Manasinghe (born 1999), Sri Lankan cricketer
- Lakshitha de Silva (born 1990), Sri Lankan cricketer
- Tharanga Lakshitha (born 1982), Sri Lankan cricketer
