= Silva Oliveira =

Silva Oliveira is a Portuguese surname, it may be inherited from both father and mother:

== Silva Oliveira ==
- Giovanni Silva de Oliveira (born 1972) Brazilian footballer
- Kiko — Josualdo Alves da Silva Oliveira (born 1978) Brazilian footballer
- Luiz Alberto da Silva Oliveira (born 1977) Brazilian footballer
- Toni — António Conceição da Silva Oliveira, (born 1961) Portuguese football coach
- Adniellyson da Silva Oliveira, (born 1995), Brazilian footballer
- Genalvo da Silva Oliveira,(born 1982), Brazilian footballer

== Oliveira Silva ==
- David França Oliveira e Silva (born 1982) Brazilian footballer
- Hugo Veloso Oliveira Silva (born 1984) Brazilian footballer
- Júnior — Manoel de Oliveira da Silva Júnior (born 1976) Brazilian footballer
- Serginho— Paulo Sérgio Oliveira da Silva (1974-2004) Brazilian footballer

.
