= Articulation (architecture) =

Stylization of the joints of a building

In architecture, articulation is a method of styling the joints in the formal elements of architectural design. Through degrees of articulation, each part is united with the whole work by means of a joint in such a way that the joined parts are put together in styles ranging from exceptionally distinct jointing to the opposite of high articulation—fluidity and continuity of joining. In highly articulated works, each part is defined precisely and stands out clearly. The articulation of a building reveals how the parts fit into the whole by emphasizing each part separately.

== Continuity and fusion ==
The opposite of distinct articulation is continuity and fusion which reduces the separateness of the parts. Distinct articulation emphasizes the "strategic break" while the articulation of continuity concentrates on smooth transitions. Continuity (or fusion) reduces the independence of the elements and focuses on the largest element of the whole, while reducing focus on the other independent elements.

== Articulation and space ==
Architecture is said to be the art of the articulation of spaces. And geometry is the architect's basic tool, but it is not the architect's system of communication. That system is the defining of object in the surrounding space. Articulation is the geometry of form and space.

== Examples ==
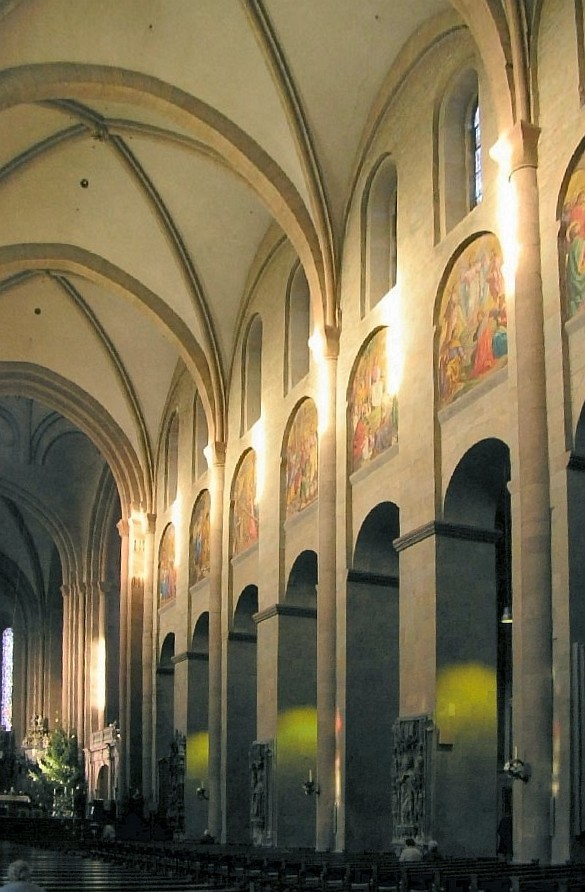
Mainz Cathedral - three internal wall elevations

=== Romanesque architecture ===
Vertical wall articulation set Romanesque churches apart from their predecessors. Dividing the church height into bays using pilasters gave the interior space a new vertical unity. It also added a new three-dimensional vision by using the horizontal line of the arcade and clerestory. The use of the compound pier allowed the wall columns to rise together with other shafts supporting walls such those supporting arches and aisle vaults into three or more levels.

=== Sydney Opera House ===
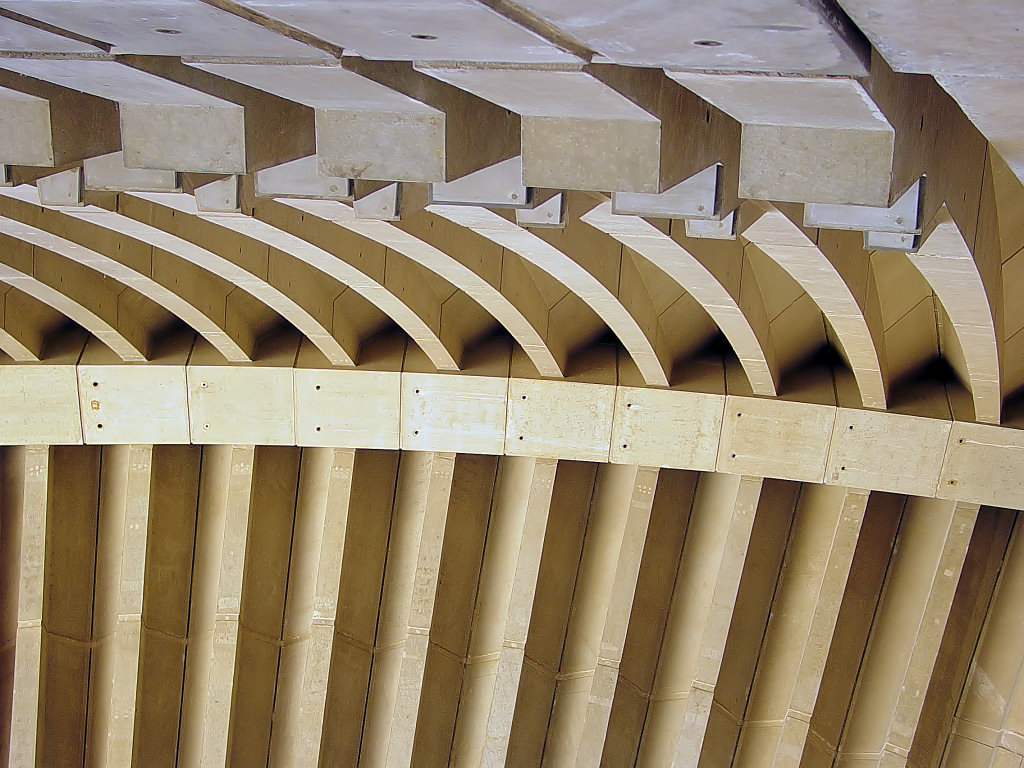
Ribs under the "wings" of Sydney Opera House

This structure is a combination of both articulation and fusion styles. Although the "wings" of the opera house stand articulated from the whole, within the wings the ribs of the structure have been fused, or made continuous, by covering the structure with a smooth surface. The smooth covering creates in the process other, larger symbolic forms in rhythmic succession on the roof. (See photo of completed structure in the gallery below.)

The result here is sensuous, related to both earth and sky, as the fused forms are more natural in form than are sharp angles with strong definition. The sharper forms, the result of the smooth surface fusion, intrude with sharp articulation into the sky.

=== Casa da Música ===
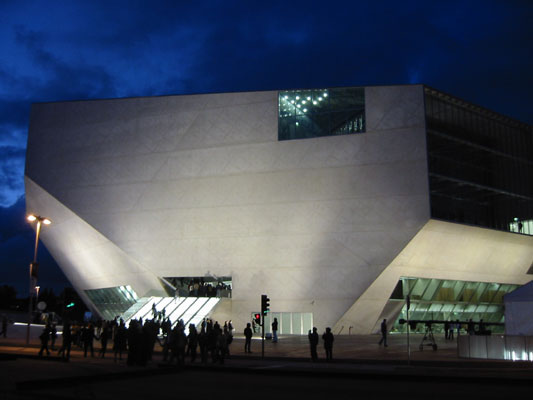
Continuity in design for exuberance - Casa da Música

The design of Casa da Música in Portugal produced a building in which the formal intellectual underpinning is equalled by the continuity, the fusion of forms, in its attempt to achieve sensual beauty. Its emotionality comes through in its exuberant external design where articulation in structure has been overwhelmed by continuity and fusion.

=== Guggenheim Museum Bilbao ===
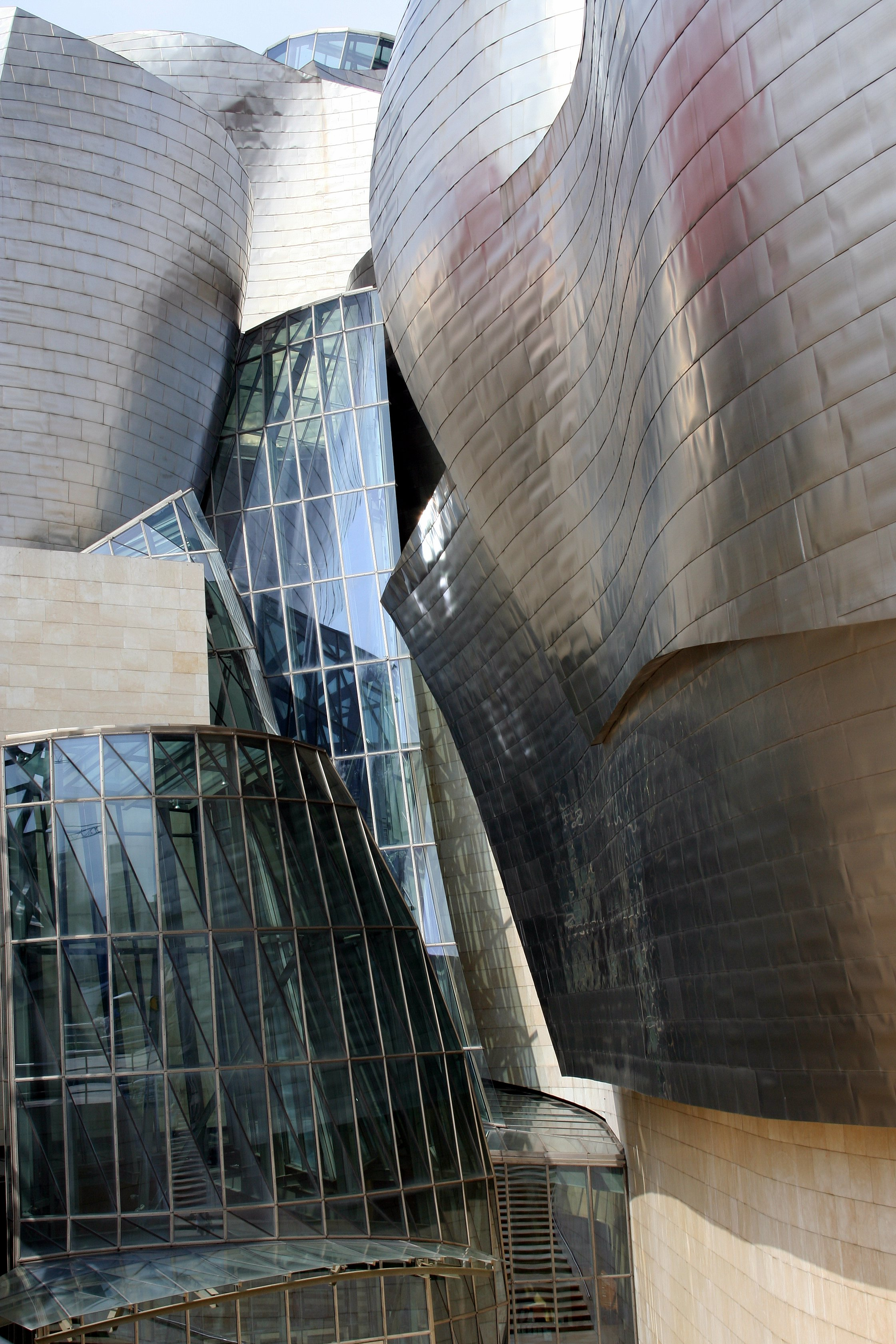
Guggenheim Museum Bilbao

In this structure, fusion and continuity dominate over articulation. The organically shaped curves on the building have been designed to appear random. According to the architect, "the randomness of the curves are designed to catch the light". Thus there is an interaction between space (environment) and form.

=== Articulation vs. continuity ===
The articulated form emphasizes the building's distinct parts. Articulation accentuates the visible aspect of the different parts of a building. Sometimes the effect completely obscures the sense of the whole, breaking it down into too many pieces, but in most cases the articulation expresses a balance between the two.

The result is often a potential sensuality, as the fused forms are closer to the form of the human body than are sharp angles with strong definition. A highly articulated art form expresses its culture's sense of it place in the world. In architecture spatial organization or articulation shows the following uses:

== Uses of articulation ==
1. Movement and circulation
2. Uses and accessibility
3. Sequence and succession
4. Symbolism and meaning
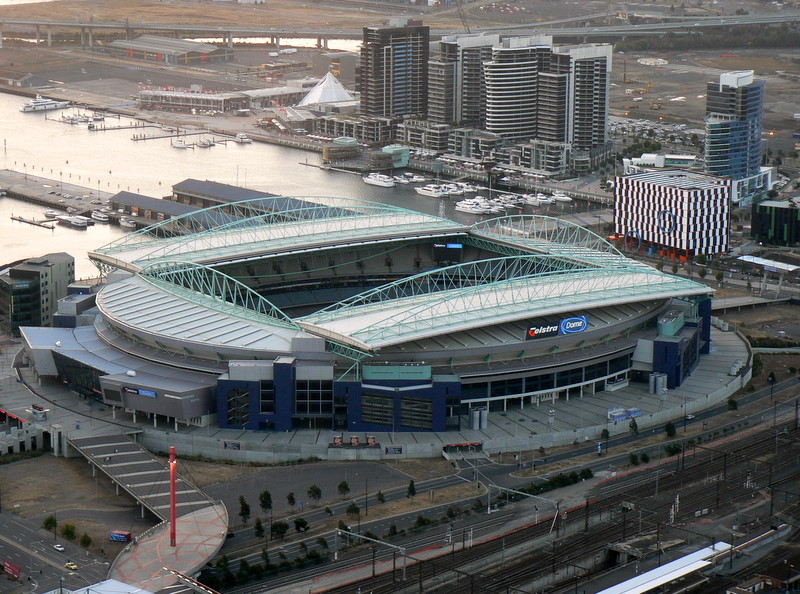
Articulation of movement and circulation - Telstra Dome

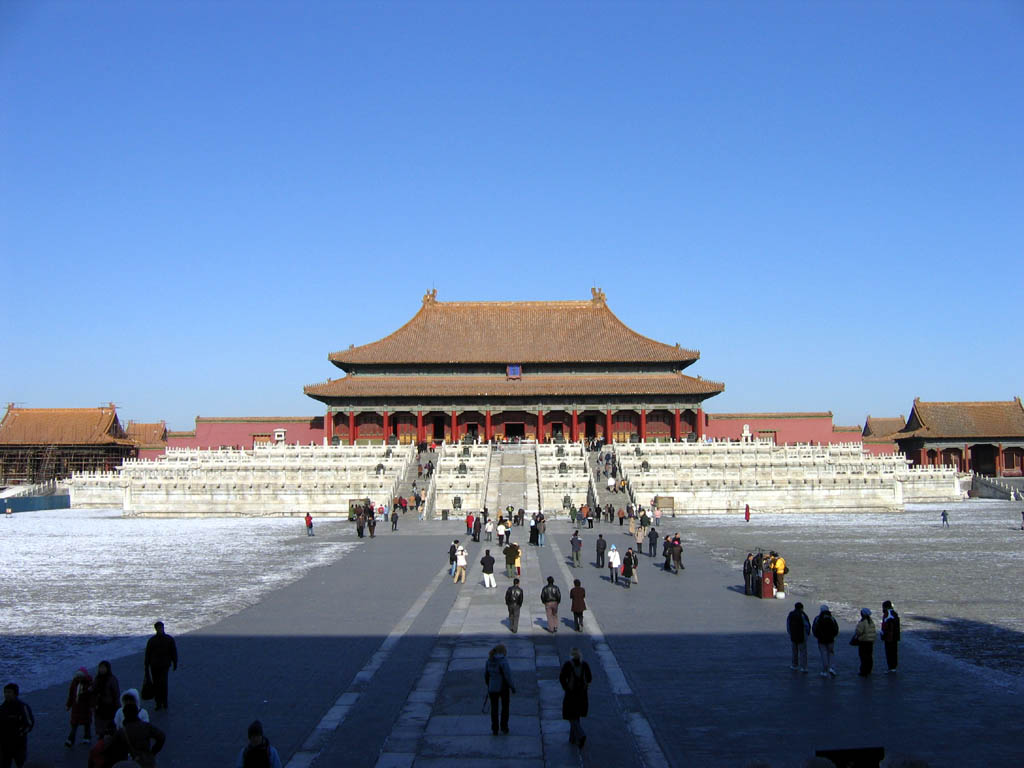
Articulation of uses and accessibility - Forbidden Palace

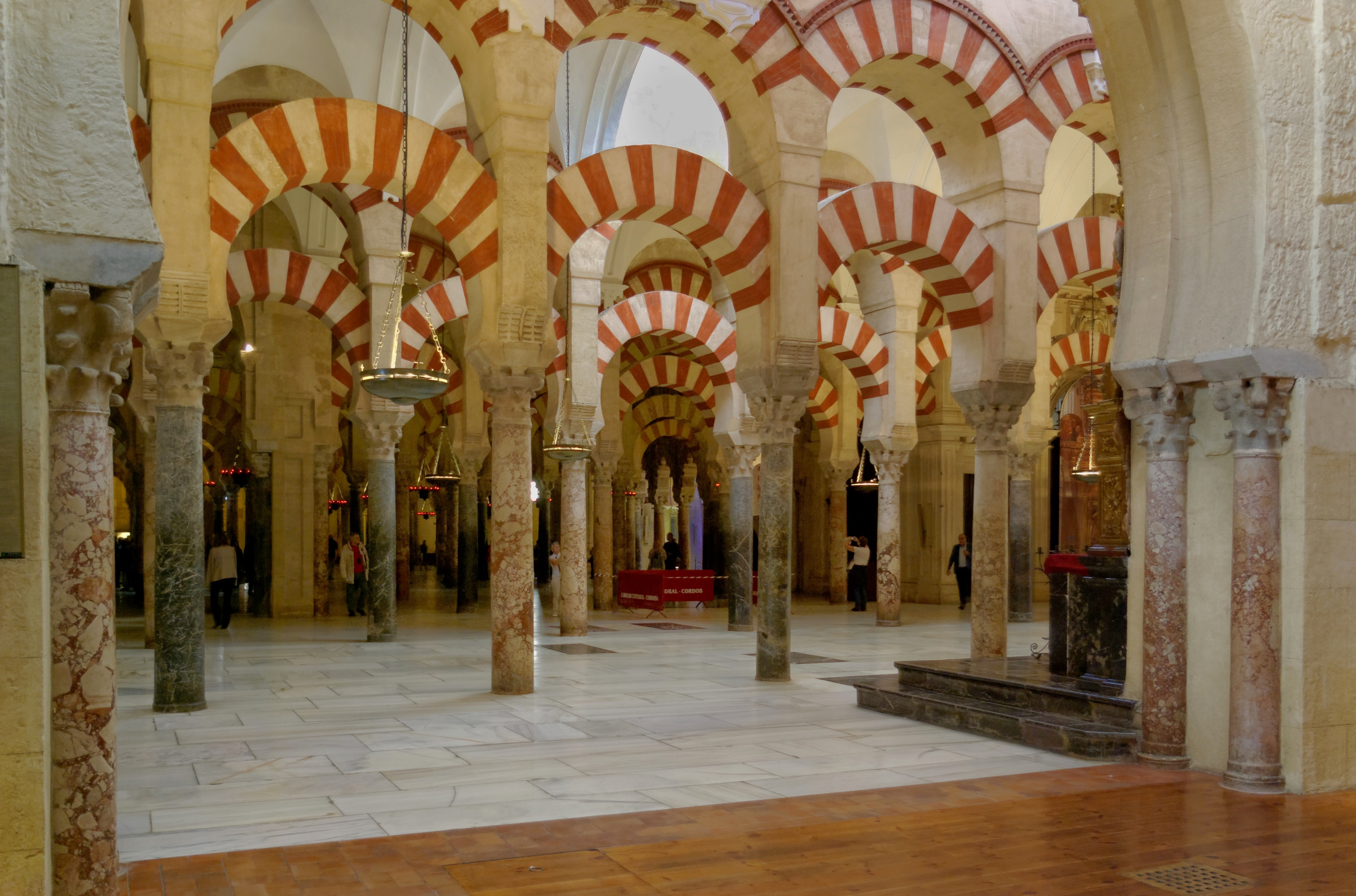
Articulation of sequence and succession - Moorish architecture - Mezquita

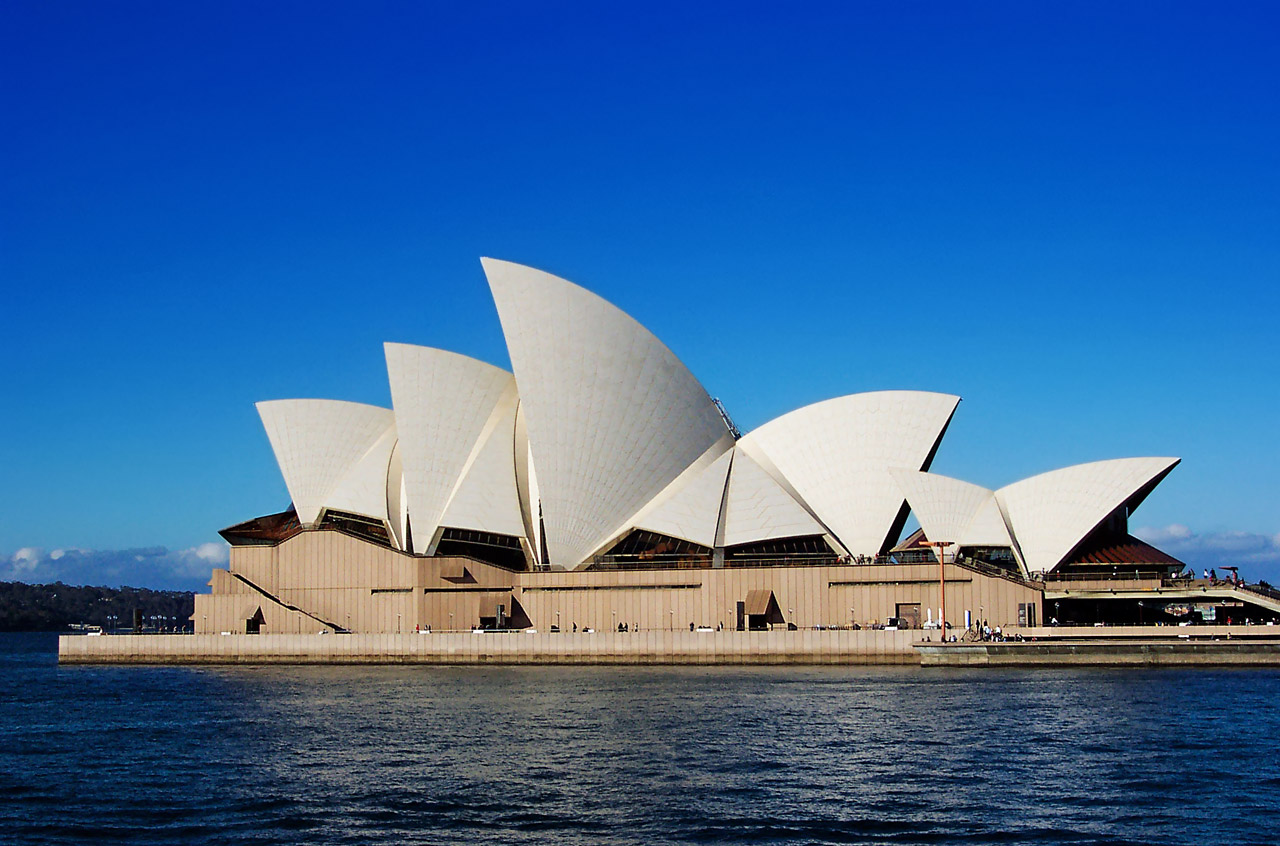
Articulation of symbolism and meaning - Sydney Opera House

== Highly articulated buildings ==
- Seagram Building
- Centre Georges Pompidou

The Fuji Television building, Tokyo (architectural style- Structural Expressionism) which was designed by architect Kenzo Tange is more of an articulated structure. The distinct elements synchronise to form a rigid-looking structure.
