= Médaille du Cercle National des Armées de Terre, Air et Mer =

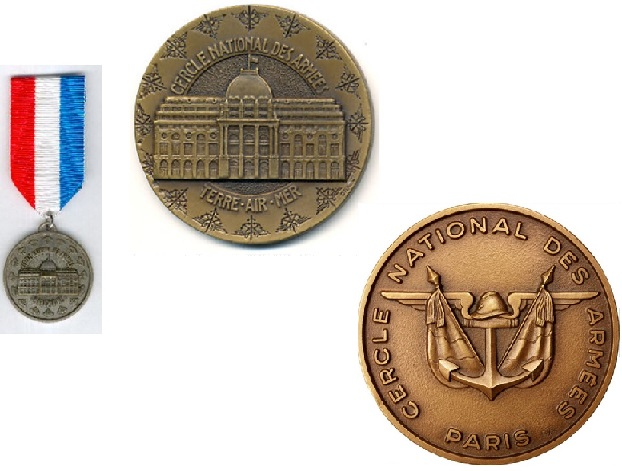
Médaille du Cercle National des Armées de Terre, Air et Mer

The Médaille du Cercle National des Armées de Terre, Air et Mer (Medal of the National Circle of the Armies of Land Air and Sea) is a military decoration of the French Republic.

== Description ==
Ribbon for Medaille Cercle National des Armées de Terre, Air et Mer

The medal is circular, silvered metal with an eyelet for suspending it from a ribbon. The face of the medal is a view in relief of the Circle’s building on the Place Saint-Augustin in Paris. The medal's face is inscribed ‘CERCLE NATIONAL DES ARMEES’ above and ‘TERRE AIR MER’ below. The inscription is contained within a border of devices with an upright sword, crossed anchors and outstretched wings for the three armed services. The reverse of the medal contains the logo of the Circle.

The medal is suspended on a recent ribbon in the French national colors of red, white and blue.

The Cercle Nationale is the French military's select professional association. Foreigners who have contributed to improved relations between their countries and France's military are also eligible for membership. It has its origins in the Order in Council of February 5, 1887, in which President Jules Grévy and the government of France's Third Republuc sought to create a professional officer corps that was not tied to the monarchist Second French Empire. The French law of April 16, 1924 authorized the Cercle Nationale's establishment on the site of the former La Pépinière Barracks, a new building designed by Charles Lemaresquier.
