= Pradeep de Silva =

Pradeep de Silva may refer to:

- Pradeep de Silva (cricketer, born 1989), Sri Lankan cricketer for Singha Sports Club
- Pradeep de Silva (Nomads Sports Club cricketer) (fl. 1989), Sri Lankan cricketer for Nomads Sports Club
