= GRASP (SAT solver) =

GRASP is a well known SAT instance solver. It was developed by João Marques Silva, a Portuguese computer science researcher. It stands for Generic seaRch Algorithm for the Satisfiability Problem.
