= Chirantha de Silva =

Sri Lankan cricketer (born 1988)

Koggala Marakkalage Pradeep Chirantha de Silva (born 1 April 1988) is a Sri Lankan cricketer. He is a left-handed batsman and wicket-keeper who played for Seeduwa Raddoluwa. He was born in Colombo.

De Silva made his cricketing debut in the 2008 Under-23 Tournament, playing seven matches in the competition in total.

De Silva's debut first-class appearance came during the 2008–09 season, against Singha Sports Club. He played eight matches during the competition, making a top score of 32 runs against Burgher Recreation Club.

De Silva played eight matches during the 2008-09 Premier Limited Overs Tournament, scoring 117 runs, including one of only two half-centuries achieved by the team in that season's competition.
