= Ranjan Silva =

Sri Lankan cricketer (born 1988)

Ranjan Silva (born Patiharamada Juwan Hewage Sanath Ranjan Silva on 18 November 1988) is a Sri Lankan cricketer. He is a right-handed batsman and a right-arm off-break bowler who plays for Singha Sports Club. He was born in Kalutara.

Silva made his first-class debut in November 2008 against Seeduwa Raddoluwa. In both innings where he batted, he scored a duck. From two overs of bowling, he took figures of 1–13.
