= David Moreira da Silva =

Portuguese architect (1909-2002)

- Born: 28 January 1909; Moreira da Maia
- Died: 2002 (aged 92–93); Porto
- Education: Porto School of Architecture
- Occupation: Architect
- Years active: 1943-2002
- Spouse: Maria José Marques da Silva (1943-2002)

David Moreira da Silva (born in Maia, Moreira, 28 january 1909, died in Porto, 2002) was a Portuguese architect of the Porto School of Fine Arts, where he completed the Special Course in Civic Architecture in 1929. He trained in Paris, at the Laloux-Lemaresquier atelier, and later received a scholarship from the National Board of Education and the Institute for High Culture.

== Biography ==
He passed the entrance exam for the Ecole des Beaux-Arts in Paris and also enrolled at the Institute of Urbanism, University of Paris. In 1939, he completed the courses of Architecture and Urbanism in those institutions, having obtained the Diploma of Special Studies in Urbanism and the French Government's Architecture Diploma (ADGF). His thesis, written in French, was entitled 'Les villes qui meurent sans se dépeupler' [Cities that die without being depopulated].

He was a student of, among others, Charles Lemaresquier, Jacques Gréber (author of the plans for the Casa de Serralves Gardens in Porto), Louis Bonnier and Picard. At the Porto School of Fine Arts he was professor of the 16th chair from 1946 to 1957, and interim professor of Group 20 at the same School, having participated in 1962 in the public competition for the provision of a teaching post for Group 20 (Urbanology), then obtaining the title of Professor Aggregate.

In 1943, he married the architect Maria José Marques da Silva, daughter of the renowned Porto architect, José Marques da Silva. They left for Angola and worked there with the French urbanist Étienne de Gröer on the preparation of the first urbanisation plan for the city of Luanda, following an identical and prior collaboration on the urbanisation plan for Coimbra.

Like Faria da Costa of Lisbon, he was one of the first Portuguese students to receive a degree in Urbanism. His first urban plans were developed with Étienne de Gröer, and he later worked individually on plans for Moledo do Minho, Águeda, Paredes, Matosinhos, Aveiro, Barcelos, Elvas, Valongo, Guimarães and Chaves.

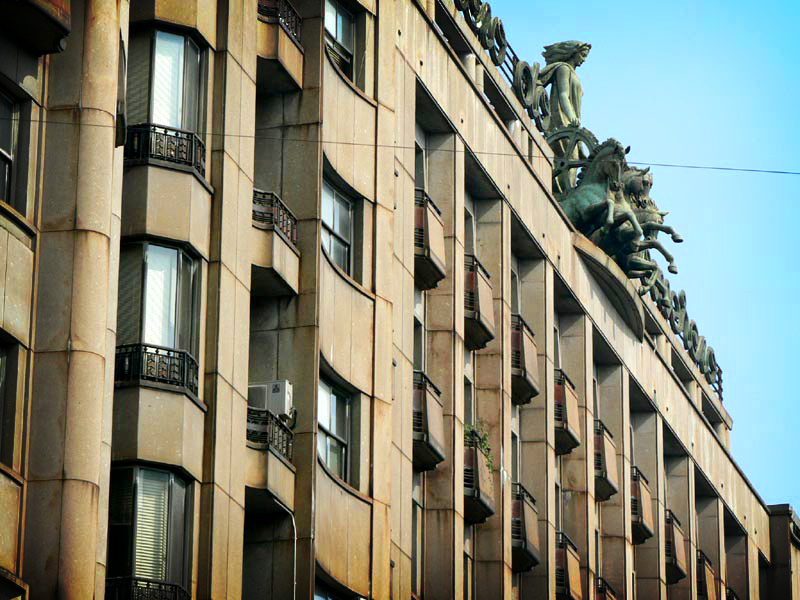
Palácio do Comércio, Porto, designed by David Moreira da Silva and Maria José Marques da Silva

Some of his architectural works were realised in partnership with his wife, the architect Maria José Marques da Silva, including important works of architecture, some highlights in Porto being the design and direction of works for the Palácio do Comércio (a large block between the streets of Sá da Bandeira and Fernandes Tomás), the Trabalho e Reforma building (in the Rua Nossa Senhora de Fátima), the residential tower block of the Stonemasons' Cooperative and the Torre Miradouro (in the Rua da Alegria), and the churchyard and pinnacle of the Church of Nossa Senhora da Conceição (in the Praça Marquês de Pombal).

He also worked with his wife to complete a number of unfinished Marques da Silva projects, for example a new building for the Sociedade Martins Sarmento, the municipal market, the Penha Sanctuary and São Torcato Church, all in Guimarães, and a building in Rua Barjona de Freitas, Barcelos. Of particular importance in Porto was the Monument to the Heroes of the Peninsular War, popularly known as the Boavista Monument, designed by Marques da Silva in 1909, delayed by two World Wars, completed in 1951 and finally unveiled in 1952.

On 26 October 1984, he was awarded the Commander of the Order of the Infante D. Henrique.
