= Rotunda da Boavista =

Roundabout in Porto, Portugal

Coordinates: 41.158132°N 8.629149°W

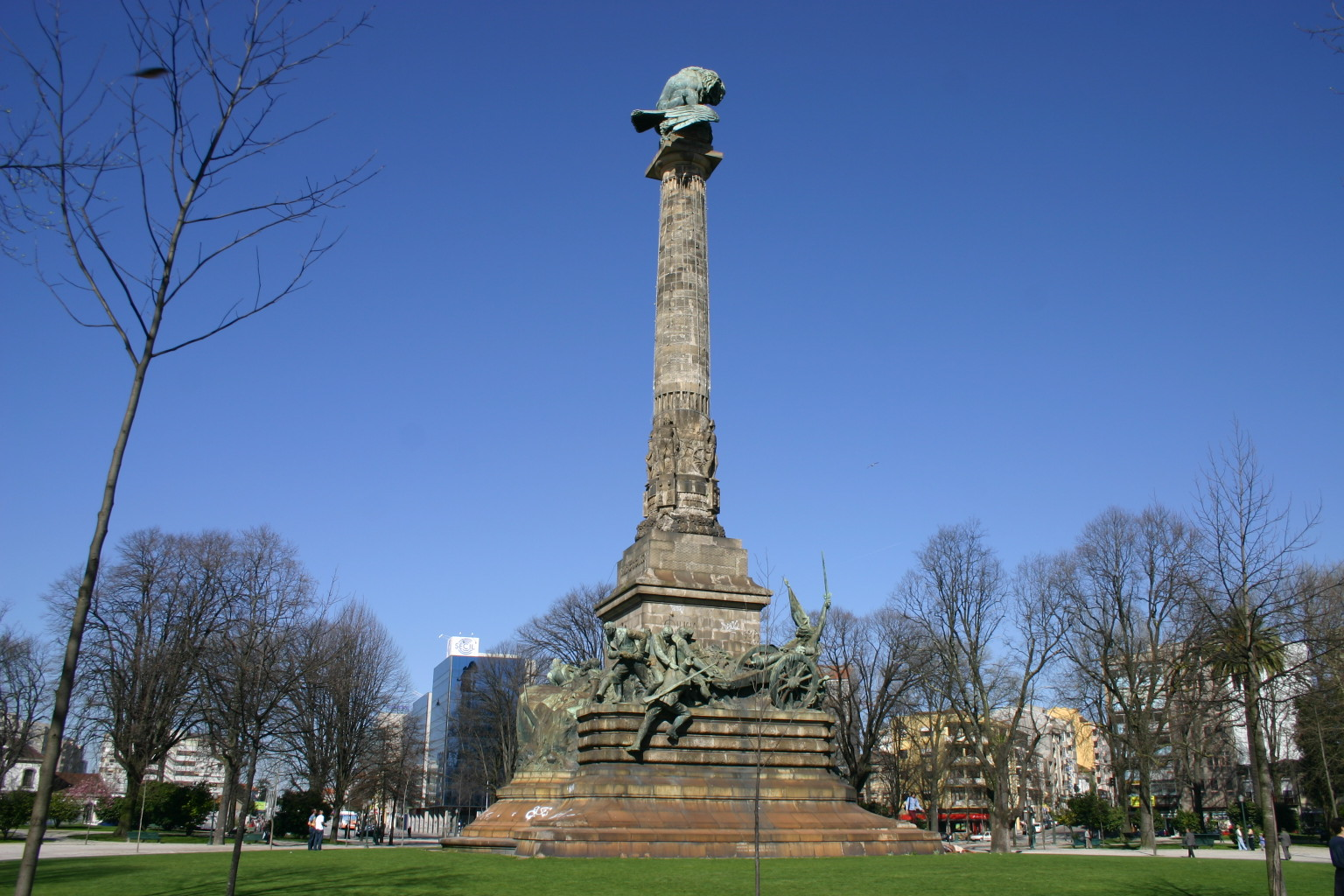
Rotunda da Boavista and its commemorative column

Rotunda da Boavista, is a large roundabout with public gardens at its centre in the Boavista neighbourhood in Porto, Portugal. Always popularly known as "A Rotunda" (roundabout) it was named Praça de Boavista on its construction in the late 1700s and was renamed in 1903 as the Praça de Mouzinho de Alberquerque, honouring the Portuguese soldier who fought in Africa during the 19th century. The gardens of the Rotunda de Boavista are notable for the very large, early twentieth century column commemorating the Peninsular Wars.

== History and symbolism ==
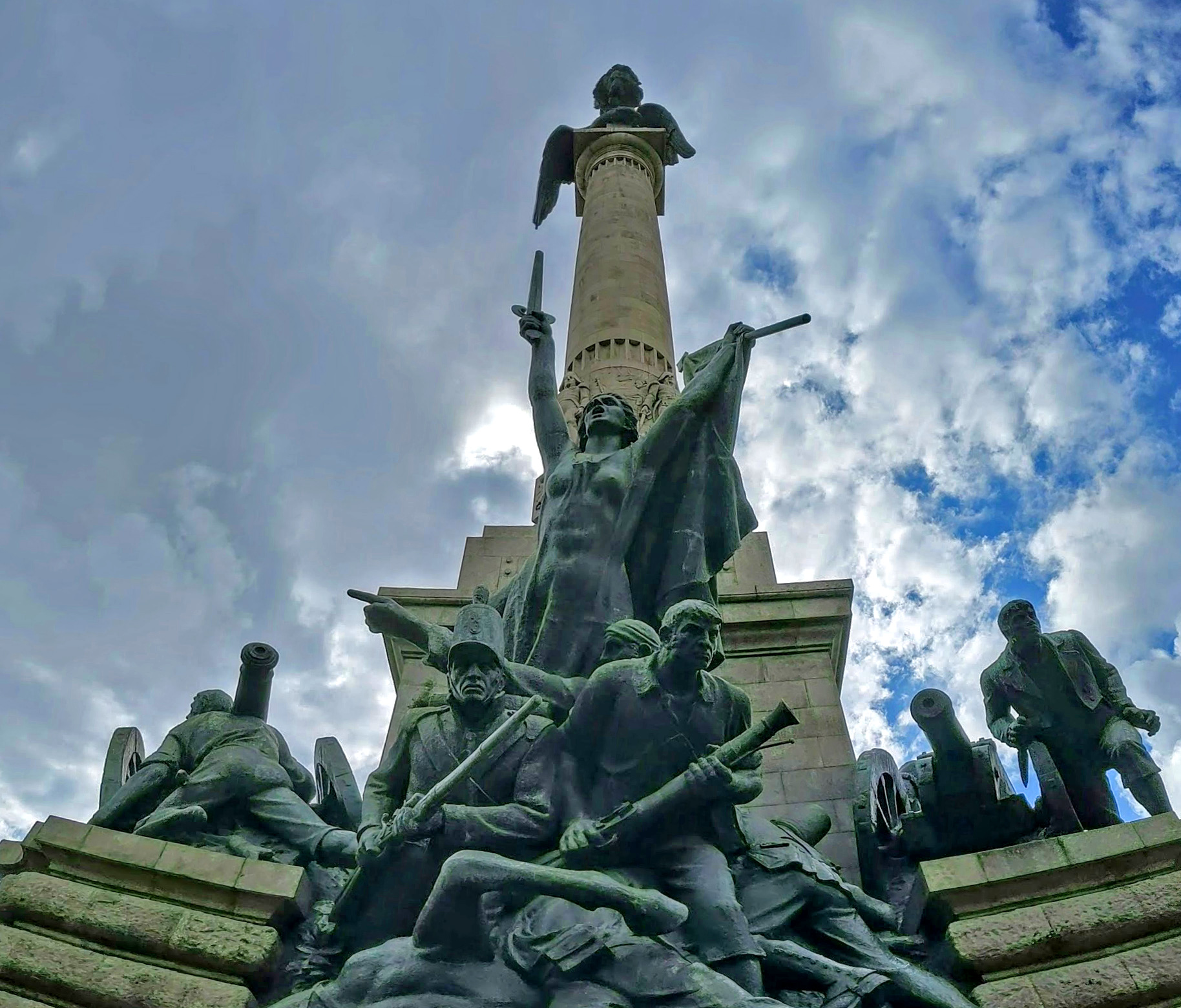
Monumento aos Heróis da Guerra Peninsular

A 45 m (148 ft) column in the middle of the rotunda (Monumento aos Heróis da Guerra Peninsular) commemorates the victory of the Portuguese and the British against the French troops that invaded Portugal during the Peninsular War (1807–1814). The column, slowly built between 1909 and 1951, is a project by the celebrated Porto architect José Marques da Silva and the sculptor Alves de Sousa. The column is topped by a lion, the symbol of the joint Portuguese and British victory, which is bringing down the French imperial eagle. Around the base are sculptures of soldiers and civilians, the latter representing the 4000 people of Porto who died in the Porto Boat Bridge disaster of 29 March 1809 when the Ponte das Barcas pontoon bridge they were crossing to flee from Napoleon's troops collapsed.

Completion of the column was delayed by two World Wars, and the monument was finally unveiled in 1952, some years after the deaths of both the sculptor and the architect, thanks to the dedicated work of Marques da Silva's daughter and son-in-law, Maria José Marques da Silva and David Moreira da Silva, themselves also architects.

== Location ==
The Casa da Música, Porto's modern music venue, is located in the Rotunda da Boavista.

The Rotunda da Boavista has 31416 m^{2} of area and there are eight streets reaching this roundabout:

- Avenida da Boavista (twice)
- Rua de Caldas Xavier
- Rua da Meditação
- Rua de Júlio Dinis
- Rua de Nossa Senhora de Fátima
- Avenida de França
- Rua de Cinco de Outubro
