= Lakshitha de Silva =

Sri Lankan cricketer (born 1990)

Lakshitha de Silva (born Muthumuni Raween Lakshitha de Silva on 30 April 1990) is a Sri Lankan cricketer. He is a right-handed batsman and right-arm medium-fast bowler who plays for Seeduwa Raddoluwa Sports Club. He was born in Chilaw. Lakshitha de Silva studied at Royal College, Colombo.

De Silva, who played for the Under-23s team during the 2009 season, made his List A debut in 2009–10, against Sri Lanka Navy Sports Club. In the first innings in which he batted, he scored 26 runs.
