= Francis Augustus Silva =

American painter

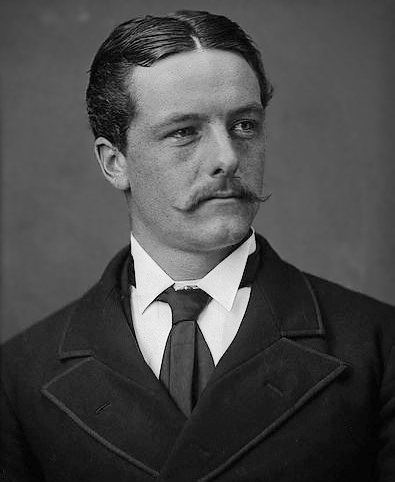
- Born: October 4, 1835; New York City, U.S.
- Died: March 31, 1886 (aged 50); New York City, U.S.
- Movement: American Luminism

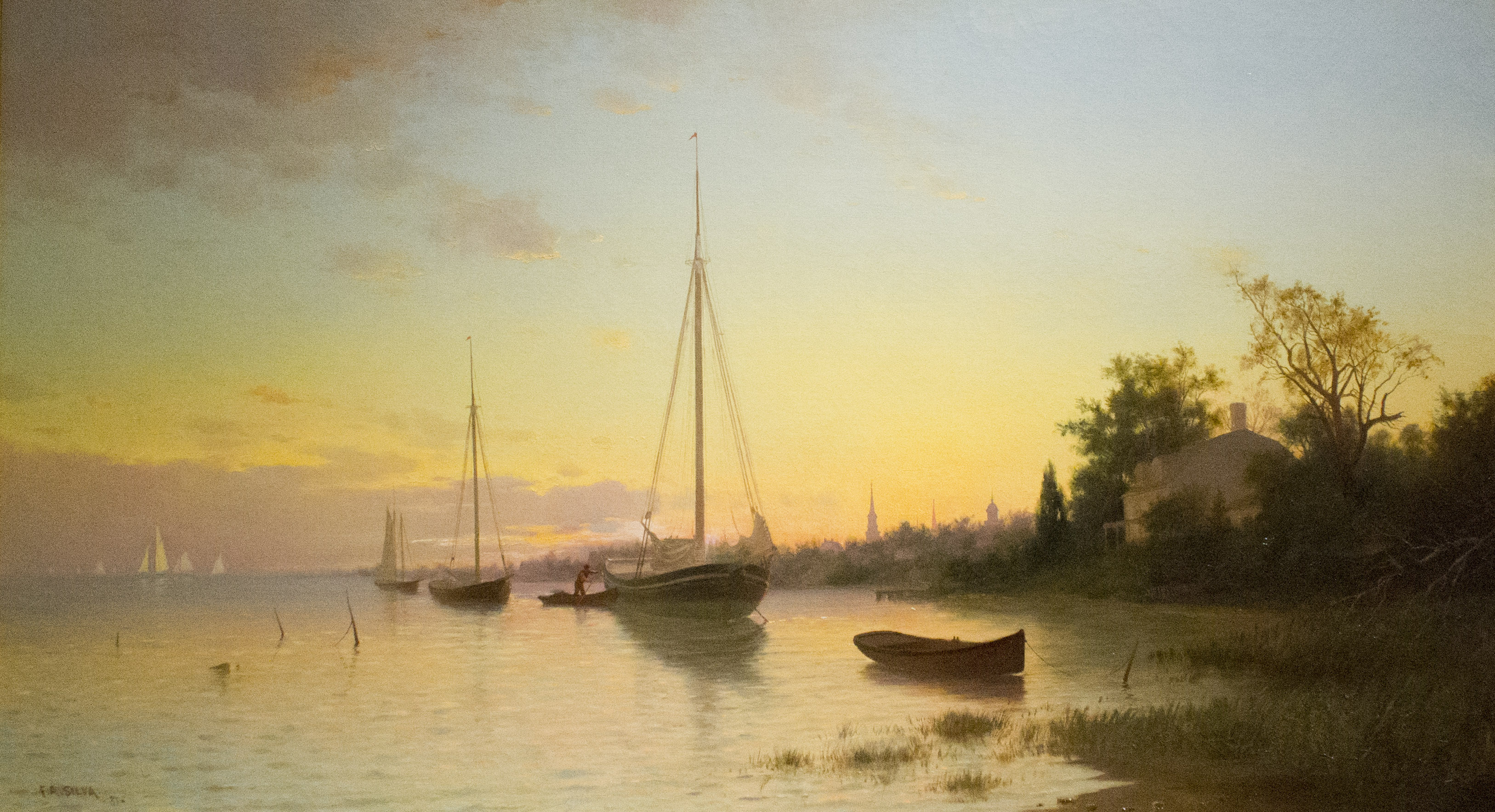
Evening (1881), New Britain Museum of American Art, New Britain (Connecticut)

Francis Augustus Silva (October 4, 1835 – March 31, 1886) was an American Luminist painter of the Hudson River School. His specialty was marine scenes, particularly of the Atlantic coast, a genre in which he masterfully captured the subtle gradations of light in the coastal atmosphere. He focused on romantic scenes, avoiding depictions of seaside recreation, even when painting scenes at Coney Island, which was then already a popular recreational area.

== Biography ==
Born in New York City, he started out as a sign painter in his home city, also painting landscape and historical scenes on the wooden paneling of stagecoaches.^{:316} In 1861 he joined the New York State Militia's Seventh Infantry Regiment and fought in the Civil War, reaching the rank of captain. Due to a bout of illness, he was mistakenly dishonorably discharged for desertion, but this was reversed three years later, allowing him to re-enlist and serve as a military hospital steward.^{:316}

In 1867 he married Margaret Watts and opened a painting workshop in New York. During the following years he participated in several exhibitions of the National Academy of Design. In 1872 he joined the American Society of Watercolorists. In 1876 he traveled to Venice, his only known trip abroad. He died of pneumonia in 1886. Although he did not achieve great fame during his lifetime, his paintings have since received greater recognition,^{:316} with one of his paintings selling for over half a million dollars.

He painted landscape paintings in the states of New York, New Jersey, Rhode Island, and Massachusetts. On occasion he would travel along the Hudson River to find material for his paintings.
