= Liyana de Silva =

Sri Lankan cricketer (born 1985)

Liyana de Silva (born 2 October 1985) was a Sri Lankan cricketer. He was a left-handed batsman and right-arm medium-fast bowler who played for Colts Cricket Club. He was born in Colombo.

De Silva made a single first-class appearance for the side, during the 2005–06 season, against Tamil Union Cricket and Athletic Club. From the lower order, he scored 12 runs in the only innings in which he batted.
