= João Marques Silva =

Portuguese mathematician and researcher

João Paulo Marques Silva is a Portuguese researcher working on the satisfiability problem (SAT) and automated reasoning. He is an ICREA Research Professor at the University of Lleida.

Between 2005 and 2009, Marques-Silva was Senior Lecturer and later Professor at the school of Electronics and Computer Science of the University of Southampton. In 2009, he moved to University College Dublin, Ireland. From 2020 to March 2024, he was a CNRS research director at IRIT in Toulouse, before moving to ICREA.

In the field of SAT he is seen as one of the most important researchers. His works ranges from SAT techniques and implementation to its applicability in model checking and biology. He has published over 50 papers. He developed the SAT solver GRASP during his PhD.
