= Guto Silva =

Brazilian politician (born 1977)

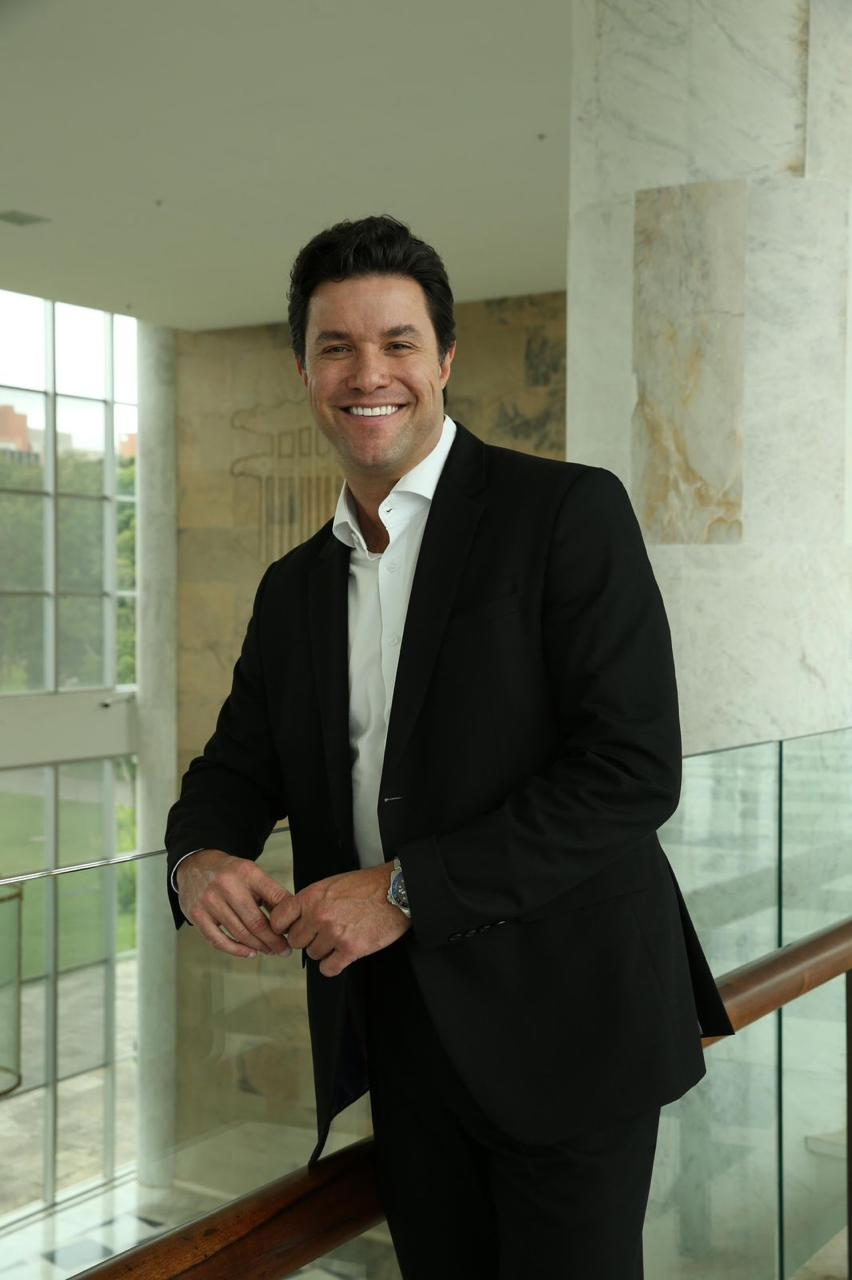
- Silva in 2025

Member of the Legislative Assembly of Paraná
- In office 1 February 2015 – 31 January 2023

Personal details
- Born: 11 February 1977 (age 49)
- Party: Social Democratic Party

Luiz Augusto Silva (born 11 February 1977), better known as Guto Silva, is a Brazilian politician serving as secretary of urban affairs of Paraná since 2025. From 2023 to 2025, he served as secretary of planning. From 2019 to 2022, he served as chief of staff to the governor of Paraná. From 2015 to 2023, he was a member of the Legislative Assembly of Paraná.
