= Maria José Marques da Silva =

Portuguese architect (1914–1996)

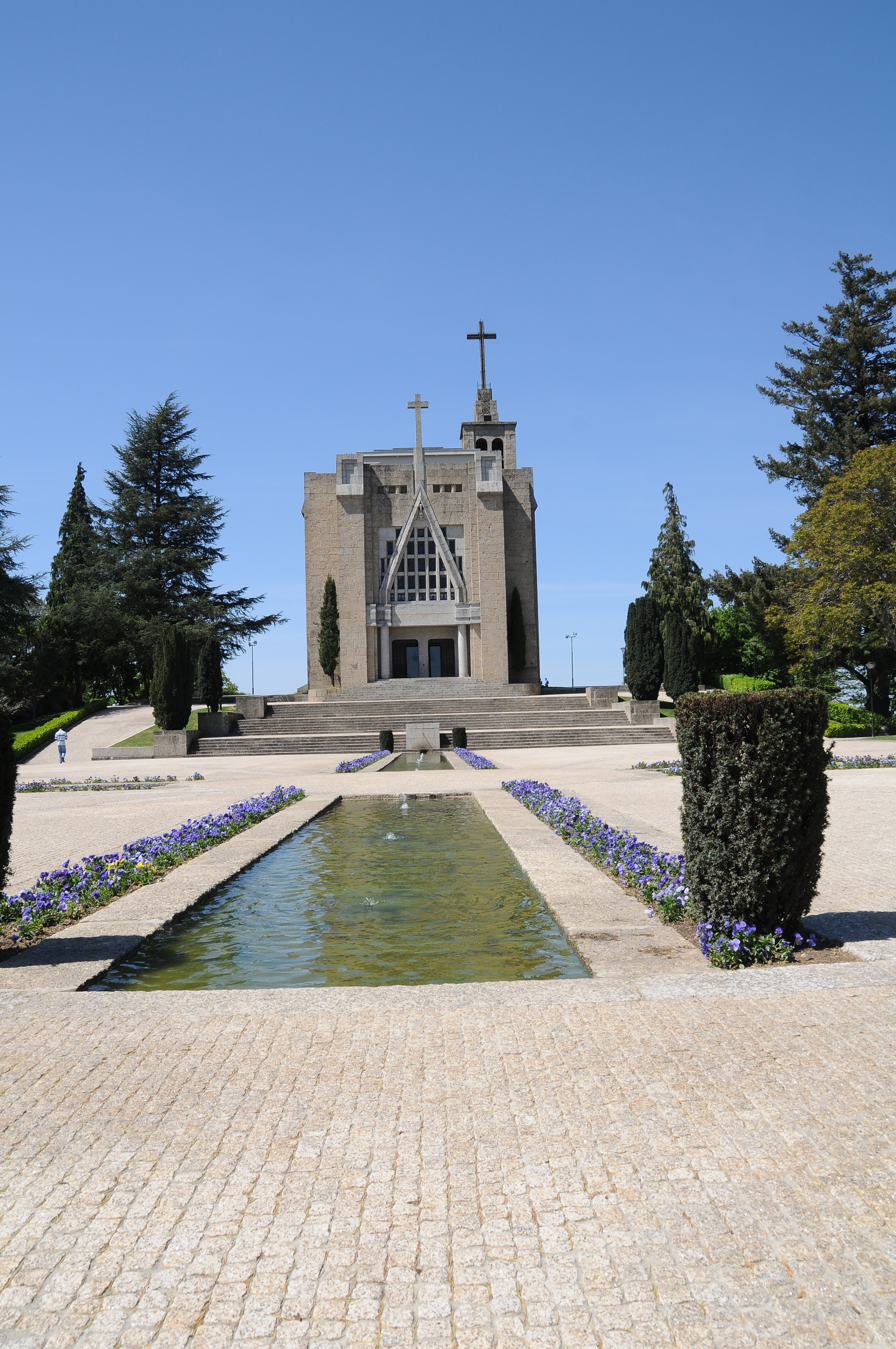
The Penha Sanctuary, Guimarães

Maria José Marques da Silva (1914–1996) was a Portuguese architect who, like her celebrated father, designed buildings in her native city of Porto. In 1943, she became the first woman to graduate as an architect from the Porto School of Fine Arts.

== Biography ==
Maria José first worked in the office of her father, José Marques da Silva, a highly successful architect in Porto. In 1943, she married the architect David Moreira da Silva. Together they opened their own business, designing a number of buildings and participating in the urban planning of the city while completing works initiated by Marques de Silva. Their principal designs include the Palácio do Comércio (1946), the Trabalho e Reforma (1953) and the Torre Miradouro (1969) buildings in Porto. They also carried out several church building assignments.

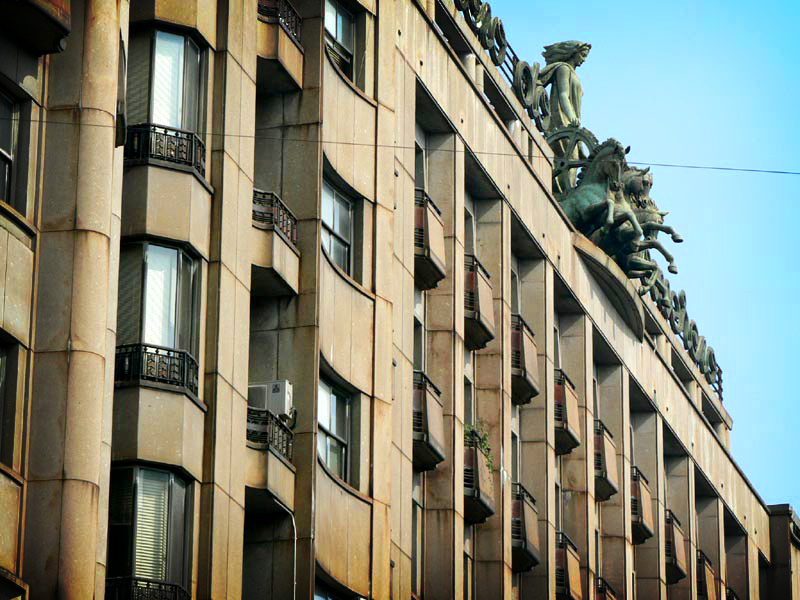
Palácio do Comércio building, Porto, designed by Maria José Marques da Silva and David Moreira da Silva

After the couple turned to farming in Barcelos in the 1970s, Maria José Marques da Silva continued to participate in the management of the Association of Portuguese Architects, organising their 40th Congress in 1986. Later in life, she also did much to support her father's legacy. One notable example of this was the Monument to the Heroes of the Peninsular War, also known as the Boavista Monument, in Porto, designed by her father in 1909, delayed by two World Wars, completed in 1951 and finally unveiled in 1952. Other Marques da Silva projects which Maria José and her husband helped to complete were a new building for the Sociedade Martins Sarmento, the municipal market, the Penha Sanctuary and São Torcato Church, all in Guimarães, and a building in Rua Barjona de Freitas, Barcelos.

In her will, she provided funding for the University of Porto to establish the José Marques da Silva Institute. She died in Porto, her home town, on 13 May 1994.

== Legacy ==
In 1996, the University founded the Architect José Marques da Silva Institute, and in July 2009 the decision was made to transform the institute into a private foundation, the Architect José Marques da Silva Foundation Institute (FIMS), whose mission is to promote the scientific, cultural, pedagogical and artistic heritage of José Marques da Silva, in the context of his time and in relation to the modern culture of which he was a precursor. The Foundation, based in the architect's own Residence-Atelier and next to the Lopes Martins family mansion, also occupying a pavilion in the large garden, houses the literary, artistic, architectural and town planning collection of the architects Maria José Marques da Silva and David Moreira da Silva. FIMS coordinates the conservation, evaluation and handling of the information with its research and dissemination, and is open to receiving or incorporating other heritage-related items of historical, scientific, artistic or documentary value, preferably referring to architecture and urban planning in Porto and Portugal. The collections and archives of many other architects have been donated to FIMS over recent years.
