= Casa da Música =

Concert hall in Porto, Portugal

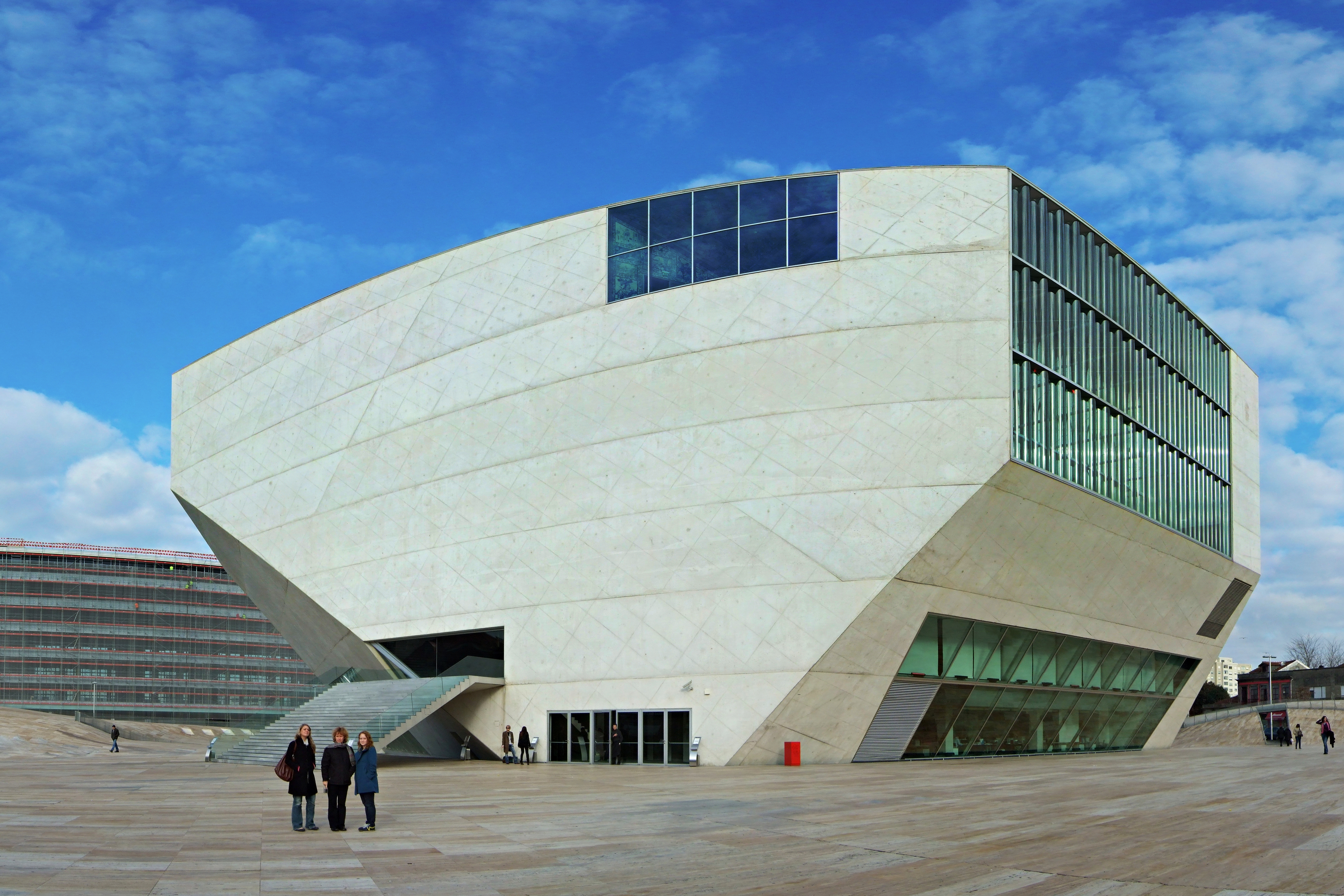
- The distinct polygon of the Casa da Música concert hall
- Interactive map of the Casa da Música area

General information
- Type: Theater
- Location: Cedofeita, Santo Ildefonso, Sé, Miragaia, São Nicolau e Vitória, Portugal
- Coordinates: 41°9′31″N 8°37′51″W
- Owner: Câmara Municipal do Porto

Technical details
- Material: Jordian marble

Design and construction
- Architect: Rem Koolhaas

Website
- www.casadamusica.com

The Casa da Música is a concert hall in Porto, Portugal. It was designed by architect Rem Koolhaas and opened in 2005.

Designed to mark the festive year of 2001 in which the city of Porto was designated European Capital of Culture, it was the first building in Portugal aimed from its conception to be exclusively dedicated to music, either in public performances or in the field of artistic training and creation.

Casa da Música's project was set in motion in 1999 as a result of an international architecture tender won by the project presented by Rem Koolhaas – Office for Metropolitan Architecture. Ground was broken in 1999 at the old tram terminus station in Boavista roundabout (Rotunda da Boavista), and Casa da Musica was inaugurated on 15 April 2005.

== History ==
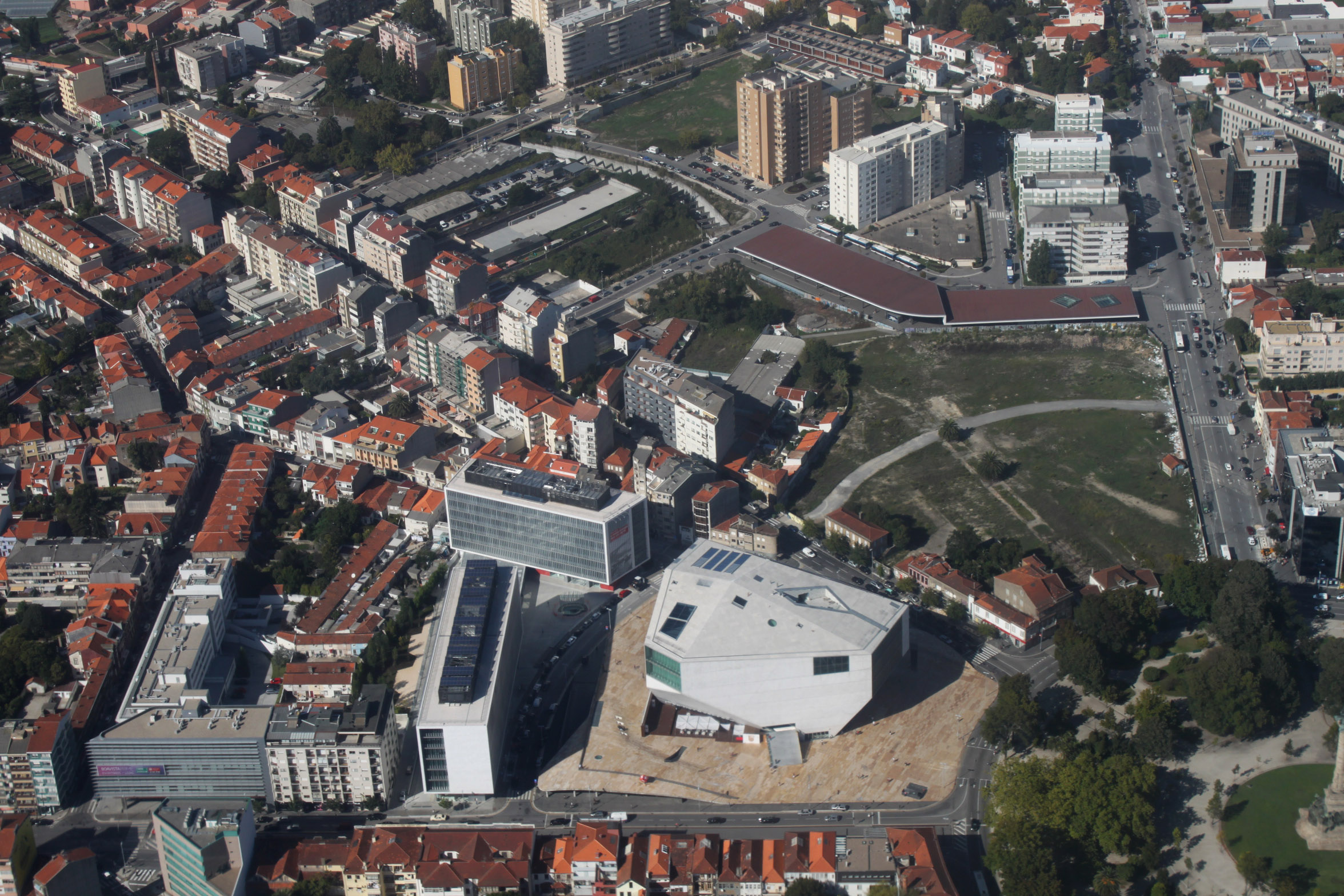
A view of the location along the Avenida da Boavista and neighbourhood of the same name

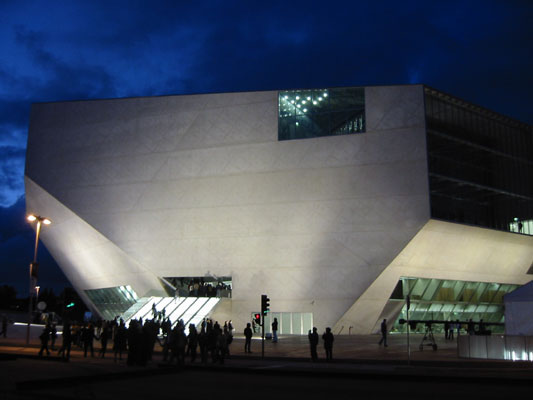
Casa da Música on opening day (14 April 2005)

On 1 September 1998, the Ministro da Cultura (Ministry of Culture) announced the construction of Casa da Música, during the ambit of Porto's 2001 tenure as the European Capital of Culture.

The building engineers were AFA Arup Group Limited (London), together with Afassociados (Porto). It was designed by Dutch architect Rem Koolhaas, in association with the Porto Office of Metropolitan Architecture, the scene agency Ducks scéno, the acoustician Renz Van Luxemburg and AFA, while the interiors were designed by Inside Outside (Petra Blaisse). These included the 13 large surfaces, ranging from 22 by 15 metres (72 ft × 49 ft) to 65 by 8 metres (213 ft × 26 ft), with a gold leaf woodgrain pattern in the large auditorium.

Its location was decided on 8 March 1999, on a municipal tract of Boavista. The site was once a staging area for trams. Construction occurred in the next four years over schedule, and cost 100 million euros. The project challenged engineers because of the building's unusual configuration.

It was open to the public on 14 April 2005, with performances by Clã and Lou Reed, while the official inauguration occurred the next day in the presence of the Portuguese president, prime minister, other notable politicians and members of Portuguese society, with a concert by the Orquestra Nacional do Porto (Porto National Orchestra). It immediately became a city icon. Featuring a 1300-seat auditorium suffused with daylight, it is the only concert hall in the world with two walls made entirely of glass.

On 5 November 2005, an administrative process was begun to classify the building as Imóvel de Interesse Público (Property of Public Interest).

The building's design was acclaimed worldwide. Nicolai Ouroussoff, architecture critic from The New York Times, called it the "most attractive project the architect Rem Koolhaas has ever built" and indicated that it is "a building whose intellectual ardor is matched by its sensual beauty". He also compared it to the "exuberant design" in Frank Gehry's Guggenheim Museum in Bilbao, Spain. "Only looking into the original aspect of the building, this is one of the most important concert halls built in the last 100 years". He compares it to the Walt Disney Concert Hall, in Los Angeles, and the Berliner Philharmonie.

A foundation, the Fundação Casa da Música, was instituted on 26 January 2006 under decree 16/2006. But, in reference to its classification, the process was archived on 15 March 2011.

In September 2008, the Casa da Música hosted the Orquestra Nacional do Porto, which took part in exploratory public presentations in which music was captured alongside the musicians' and conductor's expressive gestures. Various sensor networks sourced and translated musical expressions into computer-driven visual interpretations (which included lighting, projected images, and real-time improvisations). Scientific articles were also published on special-needs performances and workshops in the Casa da Música in 2007 and 2008.

== Resident Ensembles ==
The Casa da Música Foundation maintains permanent ensembles that ensure a regular program covering various periods of music history.

- Orquestra Sinfónica do Porto Casa da Música: The institution's main symphonic ensemble, dedicated to performing the great orchestral repertoire, from classicism to 21st-century compositions.
- Remix Ensemble Casa da Música: A contemporary music ensemble focused on current creation. It is internationally recognized for its regular premieres of works by contemporary composers.
- Orquestra Barroca Casa da Música: Specializes in the performance of early music (Baroque and Classicism). Its distinguishing feature lies in the use of period instruments and the practice of historically informed performance.
- Coro Casa da Música: A professional vocal ensemble that presents an eclectic repertoire, ranging from Renaissance polyphony to contemporary vocal languages.
- Coro Infantil Casa da Música: An artistic and educational group focused on training young voices, integrating the teaching and performance aspects of the institution.

== Technological Innovation: Digitópia ==
Created in 2007, Digitópia is the platform and hub for research, exploration, and digital technological production at Casa da Música. It operates at the intersection of technology, artistic creation, and education. In addition to developing open-source software and digital instruments (such as the Orelhudo! digital educational platform and the DigiBall), Digitópia regularly collaborates with resident groups in the performance of works that require real-time electronics and audiovisual components. The hub also organizes initiatives such as PEMS (Porto Electronic Music Symposium) and explores Artificial Intelligence in participatory musical creation.

== Educational Service and Social Inclusion ==
Casa da Música stands out for its strong commitment to democratizing access to culture through its Educational Service, involving thousands of participants annually. The institution develops strongly inclusive and community-oriented projects, notably Som da Rua (started in 2009, involving vulnerable and homeless citizens), Mundi (focused on the intercultural integration of immigrant communities), and the A Casa Vai a Casa program, which brings music to hospitals, day centers, and social solidarity institutions for populations with reduced mobility. The Foundation also annually promotes the Ao Alcance de Todos festival, primarily dedicated to people with special needs.

== Architecture ==
The building is shaped as a nine-floor-high asymmetrical polyhedron covered in plaques of white cement, cut by large undulated or plane glass windows. It is accessible through a front stairway and stands at the center of a vast open plaza of marble, yellow with hint of brown. Its isolated architectural form, deeply set back from adjacent streets, including the main Avenida da Boavista, and from the city's prime ceremonial public space, the Praça Mouzinho de Albuquerque, is evocative of the hull of a ship beached at low tide. It deliberately challenges the neoclassical order of converging avenues and the vast oval of continuous blocks centered on a tall monument, Heroes of the Peninsular War, that has defined the Praça.

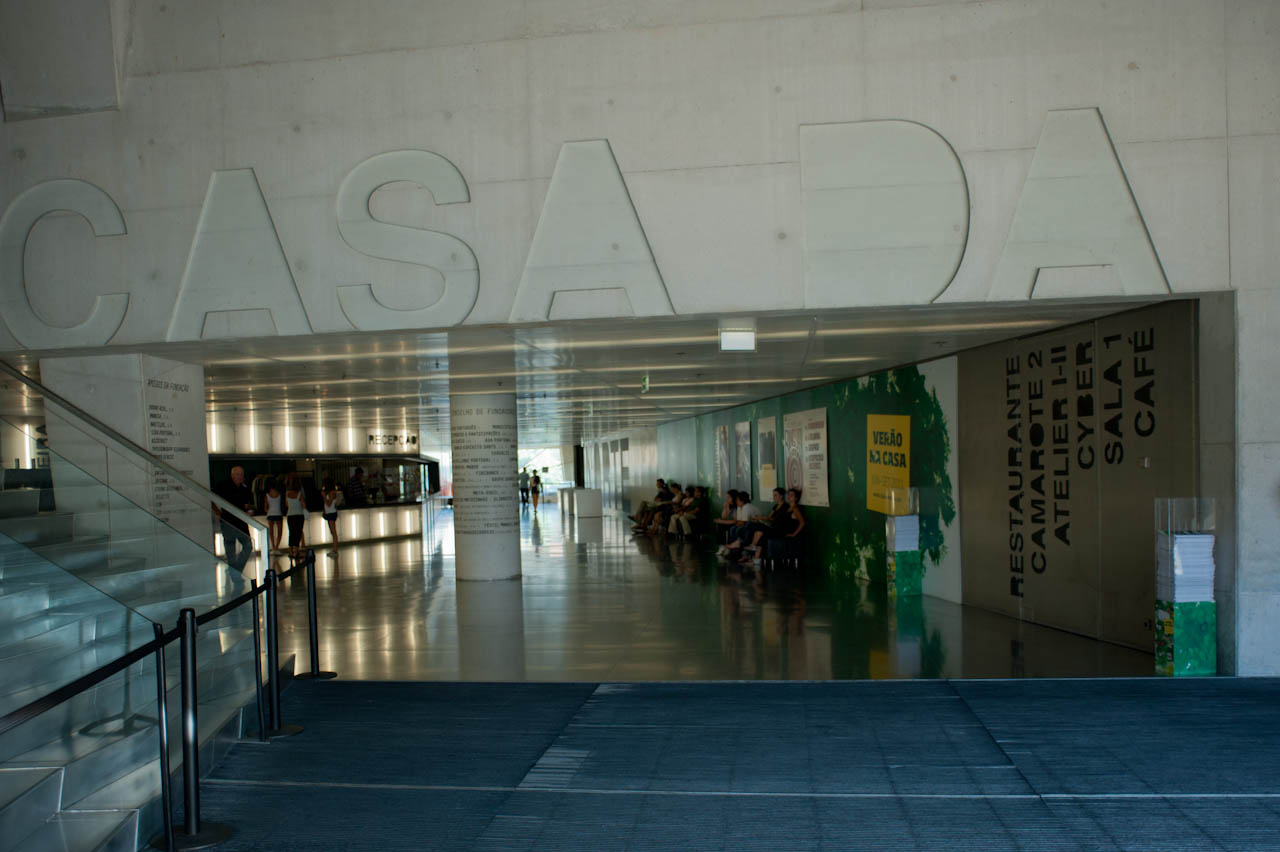
The reception hall

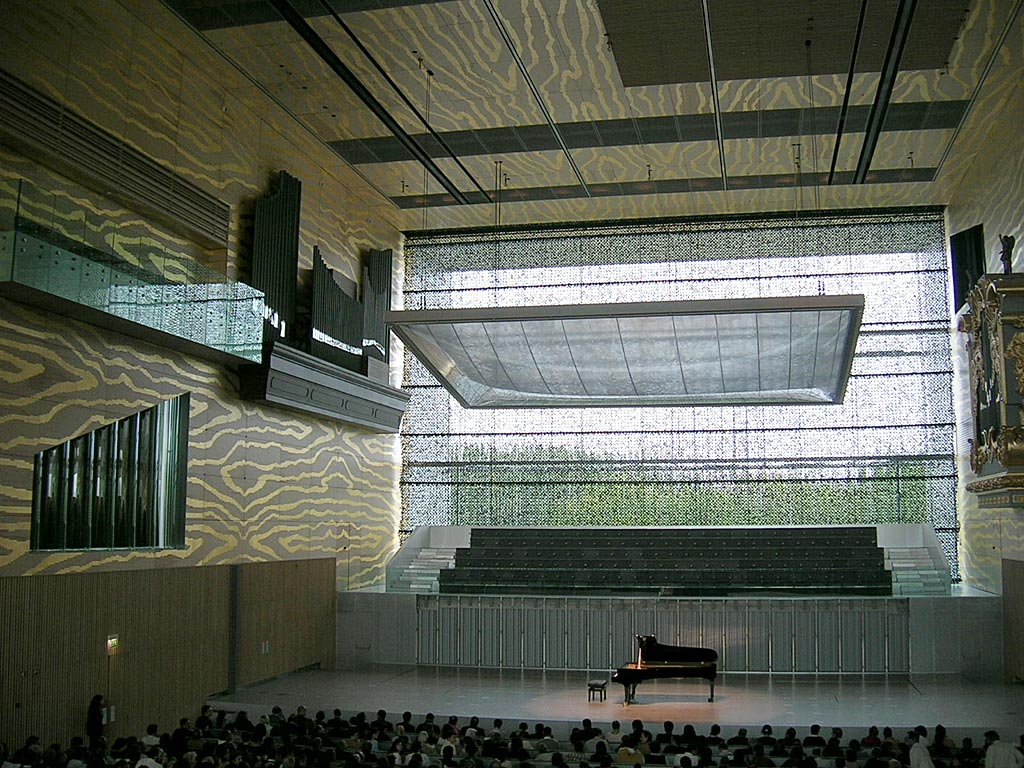
One of the distinct interior views of the main auditorium

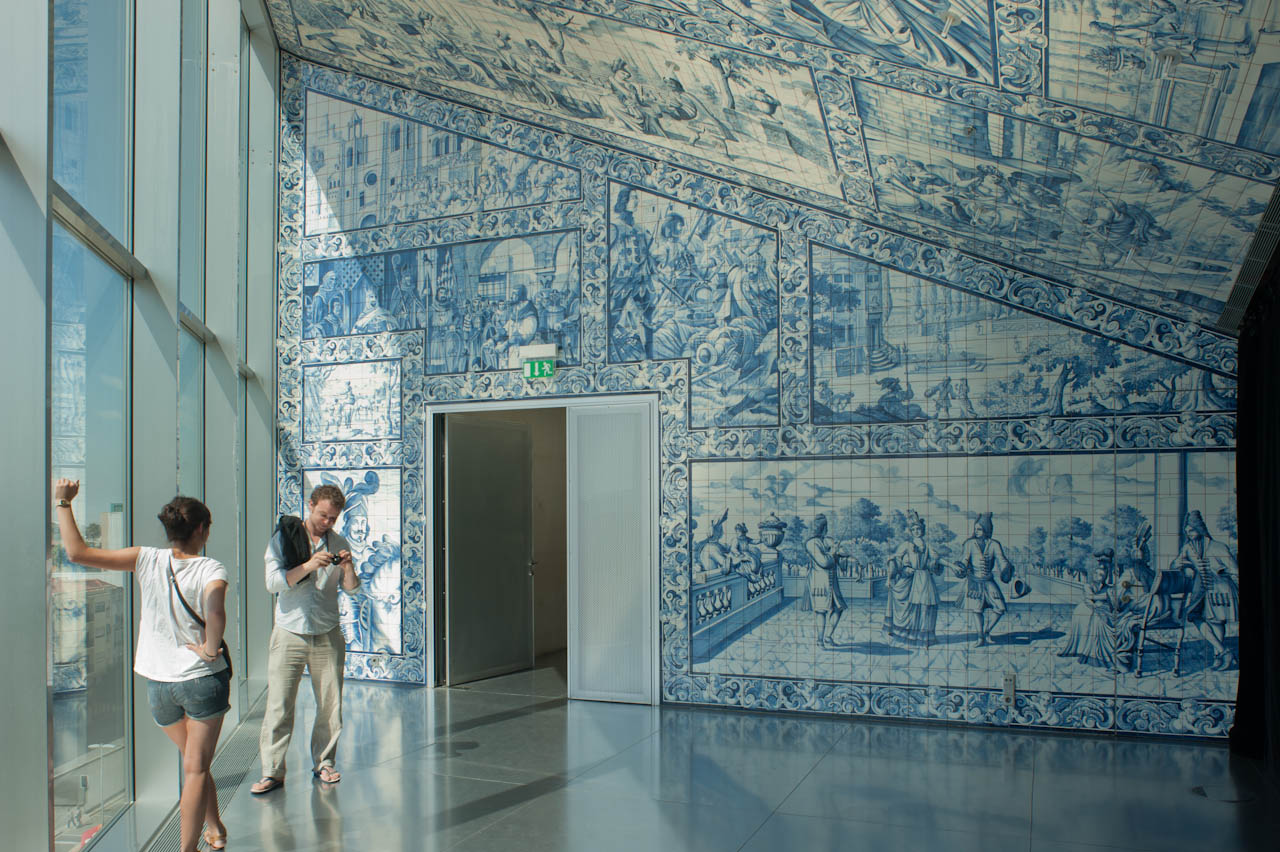
The azulejo walls on the VIP hall

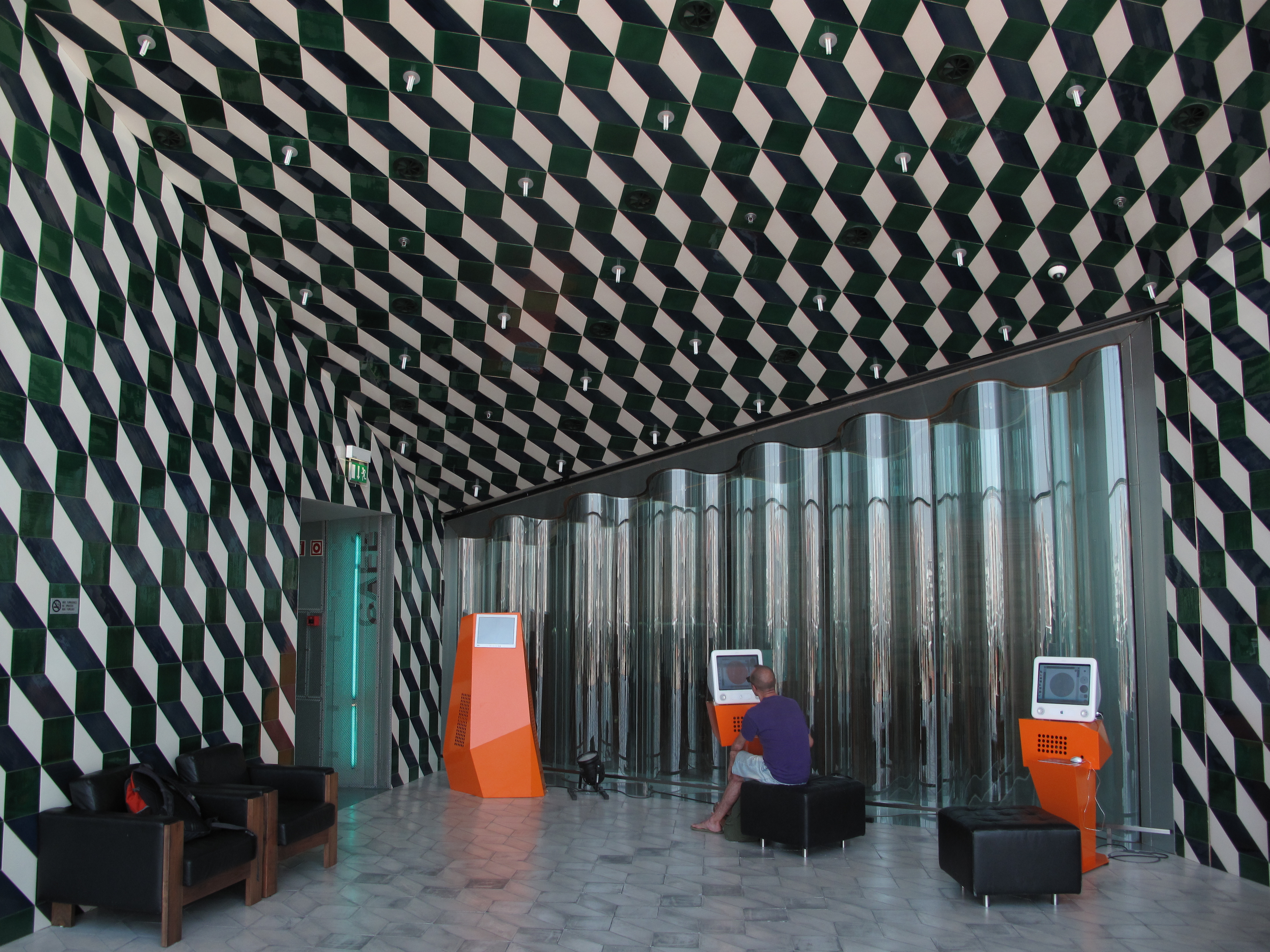
The interactive computer room in Casa da Música

== Sala Suggia - Suggia Hall ==
The Suggia Hall is the main auditorium and most emblematic hall of the Casa da Música. Its name is a tribute to the celebrated Porto-born cellist Guilhermina Suggia. Honoring the legacy of this artist, the institution regularly promotes the "Cello Marathon" and hosts the prestigious "Suggia International Prize," focused on distinguishing and supporting young European talents of this instrument.

Designed as a world-class venue, it stands out for its remarkable versatility. The auditorium is equipped with flexible devices that allow for effective adaptation of its acoustics, ensuring an optimized response for both purely acoustic concerts and unamplified instruments (such as symphony orchestra performances), as well as for accommodating the most sophisticated amplified sound designs. In terms of size, the hall is usually referred to as having a capacity of 1,238 seats.

As the resident venue of the Porto Casa da Música Symphony Orchestra, the hall hosts a huge diversity of program formats. In addition to large symphonic concerts, choral performances, and recitals from the Piano Cycle, the venue regularly hosts world music shows, jazz festivals, and contemporary urban genres such as pop and rock. A notable example of its eclecticism is its use for events like the iconic "Clubbing," in which the hall transforms to accommodate performances by alternative bands, DJ sets, and dance music.

== Sala 2 - Room 2 ==
Room 2 is the second largest auditorium in the Casa da Música. It stands out for its complete cladding in perforated plywood dipped in red paint and its gilded chairs, in a clear aesthetic inspiration from Italian Baroque opera houses. It is an extremely versatile room: it has a flat floor without fixed chairs, which allows it to vary its capacity (from about 270 seated people to 650 standing) and to host everything from chamber music recitals to pop/rock shows or shows for babies.

== See also ==
- World Architecture Survey
