= Tomás Silva =

Tomás Silva may refer to:

- Tomás Xavier de Lima Teles da Silva, 1st Marquis of Ponte de Lima (1727-1800), Portuguese nobleman and statesman
- Tomás Silva (footballer, born 1966), Uruguayan football midfielder
- Tomás Silva (footballer, born 1999), Portuguese football winger
- Tomás Silva (footballer, born 2003), Argentine football defender

== See also ==
- Guillermo Thomas Silva, Uruguayan cyclist
- Thomas Silva, American engineer
