= Sammu Raghu De Silva Chandrakeerthy =

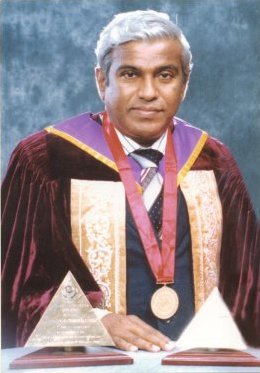
- Born: 19 December 1945; Galle, Ceylon
- Education: Richmond College, Galle; University of Ceylon; University of Sheffield, England
- Occupations: Engineer, Professor
- Spouse: Nirmali Chandrakeerthy
- Children: Chirani, Thushari

Prof. Sammu Raghu De Silva Chandrakeerthy (born in 1945) is an engineering academic, researcher and practitioner who has contributed to the development of education and research in the fields of civil and structural engineering both in Sri Lanka and internationally. He is a former Vice-President of the Society of Structural Engineers, Sri Lanka (1992-1994). He has taught Structural Engineering Design, Building Construction, Construction Engineering, and Building Materials subjects with emphasis to Sri Lankan environmental conditions and local construction practices.

== Early life and education ==
Chandrakeerthy was born in 1945 and completed his schooling at Richmond College, Galle. He entered the Faculty of Engineering of the University of Ceylon at Peradeniya in 1963 and graduated in 1967 with an Honours Degree in civil engineering. He obtained his PhD degree specializing in structural engineering in 1973, from the University of Sheffield, England.

== Career ==
Chandrakeerthy initially worked as a lecturer at the Ceylon College of Technology from 1968 to 1972. After completing of his postgraduate studies at the University of Sheffield, England, he became a lecturer at the University of Sri Lanka, Katubedda Campus in 1973. He was promoted to the grade of Senior Lecturer in 1979 and to the post of Associate Professor in 1985. He became a Professor of Civil Engineering in 1995. He was the first person from the University of Moratuwa to obtain merit promotions to the grades of Associate Professor and Professor.

Chandrakeerthy was also a Senior Designs Engineer (visiting) at T. Harley Haddow and Partners, Edinburgh from 1980 to 1981. He was a member of the Editorial Board of the Journal “Engineer” of the Institution of Engineers, Sri Lanka from 1985 to 1987. He also worked as a British ODA Fellow, Loughborough University of Technology in 1988, and was a Fulbright Fellow and Adjunct Professor, Drexel University, Philadelphia, USA from 1989 to 1990. In 1992, he worked as an ILO Fellow, Loughborough University of Technology, United Kingdom and acted as a Research Associate, Department of Civil & Geotechnical Engineering, University of Manitoba from 1999 to 2000. He was a structural Design Consultant, Manitoba Hydro, Winnipeg, Canada from 2000 to 2001 and was a Visiting Academic, at Monash University, Melbourne and a Visiting Professor at RMIT University, Melbourne in 2009.

== Research and publications ==
He has conducted extensive research on areas of structural engineering with special reference to local application issues that have arisen in Sri Lanka. He has contributed extensively to the development of Sri Lankan national standards and codes of practice for control of materials, specifications and designing and drawing of structures.

He has published papers:

- As the sole author in international journals such as Journal of Structural Engineering, ACSE, Masonry International, and Indian Concrete Journal
- As an author leading team of student researchers in international journals such as Masonry International
- As the sole author of award-winning papers in local peer review publications (Transactions of IESL / E. O. E. Pereira Award and Engineer Journal / CDE Award)
- As an author leading a team of student researchers in an award-winning paper in local peer reviewed publications (Transactions of IESL / E.O.E. Pereira Award).
- He was successful in the publication of 12 papers in international refereed journals, and 51 papers in Sri Lankan refereed publications with many other publications in conferences and workshops.

== Awards and achievements ==
In 2013, Chandrakeerthy was awarded the degree of Doctor of Science (Honoris Causa) by the University of Moratuwa.
