= Charles Lemaresquier =

French architect

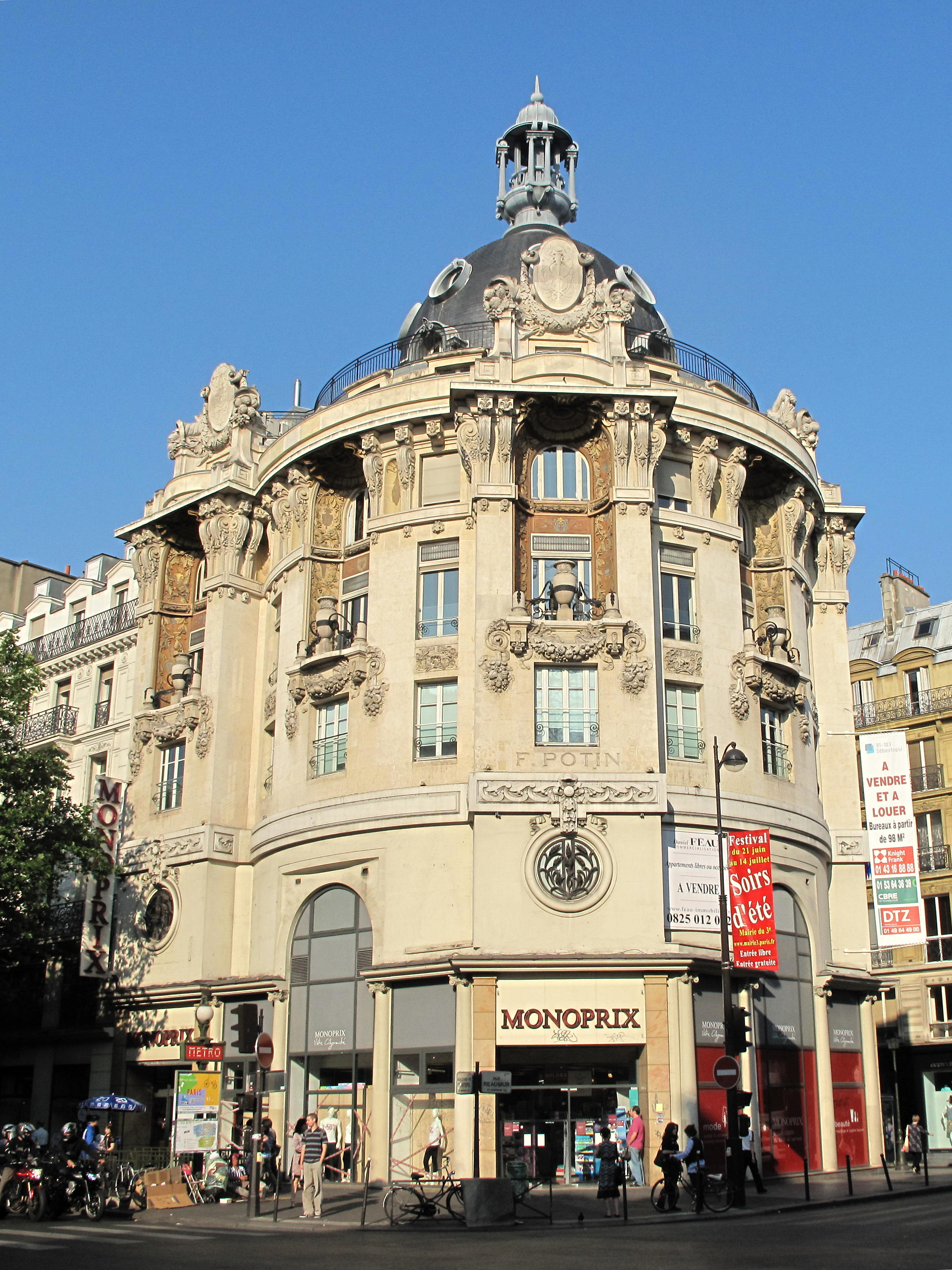
Félix Potin building, Paris, 1910

Charles Henri-Camille Lemaresquier (16 October 1870 in Sète - 6 January 1972 in Paris) was a French architect and teacher.

Lemaresquier was born in Sète, in southern France, into a family of artists, and apprenticed to a Parisian architect at the age of 16. He was accepted into the École nationale supérieure des beaux-arts de Paris in 1888, and by 1890 was in the atelier of Victor Laloux, who had taken over from his mentor Louis-Jules André after André's death.

In the summer and fall of 1927, Lemaresquier represented France on the jury of nine European architects judging the high-profile Palace of Nations competition, assessing the 375 entries alongside fellow judges such as Hendrik Petrus Berlage, Victor Horta, and Josef Hoffman.

Among his students were Max Ingrand and David Moreira da Silva. The architect held seat #6 of the Architecture section of the Académie des Beaux-Arts from 1938 until his death in 1972.

In 1900 Lemaresquier married Germaine Ribaucourt (1874–1951), and their union produced four children. His son Noël Le Maresquier (1903–1982) trained in his father's atelier, modified the family surname, and became an architect with a similar career with similar honors. Lemaresquier was also the father-in-law of French Prime Minister Michel Debré, who married the architect's daughter Anne-Marie.

== Work ==
Lemaresquier's work includes:

- headquarters for grocery retailer Félix Potin, No. 51 rue Réaumur, 1910
- apartment building, 2 rue Coustou, Paris, 1926
- National Circle of Armies, 8 Place Saint Augustin, on the former site of the Pépinière Barracks, Paris, with architectural sculpture by François-Léon Sicard, Paul Landowski, Jean Antoine Injalbert and Jean Boucher, 1927
- Juncasse veterinary school, 23 avenue Henri-Guillaumet, Toulouse, 1931
- Palais Berlitz, built as the Palais du Hanovre, 26-34 Rue Louis Legrand, Paris, 1932
- work at the Notre-Dame-de-l'Assomption, Paris, 1961
