= Kiko (footballer, born 1978) =

Brazilian footballer

Personal information
- Full name: Josualdo Alves da Silva Oliveira
- Date of birth: 24 August 1978 (age 48)
- Place of birth: Pernambuco, Brazil
- Height: 1.83 m (6 ft 0 in)
- Position: Centre-back

Senior career*
Years	Team	Apps	(Gls)
1998–2000	Cabense		
2001	Confiança		
2002–2003	Sergipe		
2003–2004	Botafogo-PB		
2005	Sergipe		
2005	Treze		
2006	Campinense		
2007	Coruripe		
2007–2010	Paços Ferreira	21	(0)
2009–2010	→ Gil Vicente (loan)	25	(2)
2010–2012	Arouca	53	(13)
2012–2013	União Madeira	32	(2)
2014	Alecrim	13	(1)
2014	Serrano-PB		
- * Club domestic league appearances and goals

Josualdo Alves da Silva Oliveira (born 24 August 1978), commonly known as Kiko, is a Brazilian former professional footballer as a centre-back.

== Career ==
Prior to a 2007 arrival in Portugal, Kiko played majorly for modest clubs in native country. Other than a brief stint with Botafogo da Paraíba, he represented Associação Desportiva Cabense, Confancia FC, Unibol-PE, Sergipe FC, Campina Grande FC, Campinense Clube and Associação Atlética Coruripe.
