= Hugo Veloso =

Brazilian footballer (born 1984)

Personal information
- Full name: Hugo Veloso Oliveira Silva
- Date of birth: May 25, 1984 (age 42)
- Place of birth: Poços de Caldas, Brazil
- Height: 1.70 m (5 ft 7 in)
- Position: Midfielder

Team information
- Current team: Uberlândia

Youth career
- 2003: Cruzeiro

Senior career*
Years	Team	Apps	(Gls)
2004–2009	Cruzeiro		
2005–2006	→ Cabofriense (Loan)		
2006	→ América-MG (Loan)		
2007–2008	→ Ipatinga (Loan)	2	(0)
2008	→ CSA (Loan)		
2009	→ Democrata (Loan)		
2009	Uberaba		
2010	Toledo-PR		
2011–	Uberlândia		
- * Club domestic league appearances and goals

Hugo Veloso Oliveira Silva (born May 25, 1984), is a Brazilian midfielder. He currently plays for Uberlândia Esporte Clube.

== Honours ==
- Minas Gerais State League: 2004

== Contract ==
- Ipatinga (Loan) 21 August 2007 to 20 August 2008
- Cruzeiro 2 January 2007 to 30 May 2009
