= Pradeep de Silva (cricketer, born 1989) =

Sri Lankan cricketer (born 1989)

Pradeep de Silva (born Warshamannada Pradeep de Silva on 30 September 1989) is a Sri Lankan cricketer. He is a right-handed batsman and right-arm medium-fast bowler who played for Singha Sports Club. He was born in Galle.

De Silva made his cricketing debut during the 2009–10 season, against Lankan Cricket Club. He scored six runs from the opening order.
