= Seeduwa Raddoluwa Cricket Club =

Sri Lankan cricket club

Seeduwa Raddoluwa
- One Day name: Seeduwa Raddoluwa Sports Club

Personnel
- Captain: (Sri Lanka) Ranil Dhammika
- Coach: (Sri Lanka)

History
- Premier Trophy wins: none
- Premier Limited Overs Tournament wins: none
- Inter-Provincial Twenty20#Twenty20 Tournament wins: none

Seeduwa Raddoluwa was a first-class cricket club based in Seeduwa, Sri Lanka. In 2011, the team was renamed Sri Lanka Ports Authority Cricket Club.

== History ==
Seeduwa Raddoluwa joined the revamped Sri Lankan first-class competition in the 2008–09 season, becoming the 32nd team to take part in the competition. They played in the 2008–09, 2009–10 and 2010–11 seasons, with their 27 matches ending in 11 wins, 6 losses and 10 draws.

== Team records ==
- Highest team total - 391 vs Police Sports Club, 2009–10
- Best innings bowling figures - TMUS Karunaratne 7/146 vs Singha, 2009–10
- Highest individual score - WWP Taraka 127 vs Police Sports Club, 2008–09
- Partnership records -
- 1st - 81 SD Jayathilake & TMUS Karunaratne vs PSC, Colombo (PPS), 2009–10
- 2nd - 68* TMUS Karunaratne & WKG Dilruk vs SLAF, Colombo (AF), 2009–10
- 3rd - 170 HG Kumara & KM Fernando vs Navy, Colombo, 2009–10
- 4th - 102 WBH Samarawickrame & TMUS Karunaratne vs Navy, Welisara, 2009–10
- 5th - 132 TMUS Karunaratne & KM Fernando vs PSC, Colombo (PPS), 2009–10
- 6th - 151 WBH Samarawickrame & DGR Dhammika vs BRC, Colombo, 2008–09
- 7th - 104 HG Kumara & AVS Nikethana vs BRC, Colombo, 2009–10
- 8th - 72 DGR Dhammika & WKG Dilruk vs Saracens, Colombo (RSC), 2008–09
- 8th - 72 WKG Dilruk & HG Kumara vs SLAF, Colombo, 2008–09
- 9th - 61 JDM de Silva & KMP Kumara vs LCC, Colombo, 2009–10
- 10th - 55 WBH Samarawickrame & WKG Dilruk vs Seb, Katunayake-FTZ, 2008/09
