= The Lovers' Quarrel =

Annual cricket match in Sri Lanka

Richmond-Mahinda Cricket Encounter
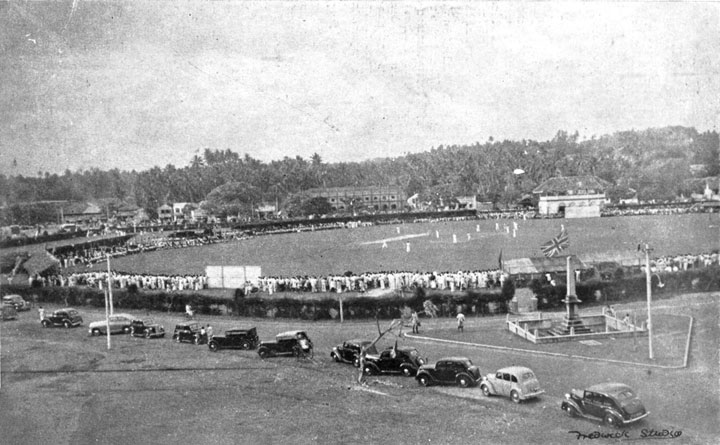
- Richmond-Mahinda big match during the British rule in Sri Lanka.
- Other names: Lovers' Quarrel
- Sport: Cricket
- Teams: Richmond College; Mahinda College
- First meeting: 1905
- Latest meeting: 2026
- Next meeting: 2027
- Stadiums: Galle International Stadium

Statistics
- Most wins: Richmond 24 - Mahinda 23

The Richmond–Mahinda Cricket Encounter, popularly referred to as the Lovers' Quarrel, is an annual cricket big match played between the first XI cricket teams of Richmond College and Mahinda College in Galle, Sri Lanka. It is one of the longest cricket match series in Sri Lanka, having been played for over 120 years. It is played at the Galle International Stadium. Lovers' Quarrel began in 1905, under the two principals Rev. James Horne Darrel of Richmond College and Sir. Frank Lee Woodward of Mahinda College. Over the years the game was played as a two day encounter but beginning from 2025 it is played as a three day game.

== Match history & Series summary ==
Richmond - Mahinda cricket big match was played for the first time in 1905 at Galle esplanade, with the two principals, Rev. J. H. Darrell of Richmond and Mr. F. L. Woodward of Mahinda, officiating as umpires. Richmond College won the inaugural match and went on to win the next two matches in 1906 and 1907. Mahinda College's first victory was registered in 1908 and their last victory in a big match was recorded in 2008, while Richmond College's last win was recorded in 2019. Having broken a 30-year-long deadlock of draws, Mahindians registered an emphatic 10 wicket win over Richmondites in the 2008 encounter. After a 45-year-long winless streak, Richmondites also registered a win by an innings over Mahindians in the 2014 encounter and continued to a second consecutive win by an innings in 2015.

In 1953, Mahindian Somasiri Ambawatte captured all ten Richmond’s wickets in an innings to claim the bowling record of the series and in the same match he scored a century to record the finest all round feat in the history of the big match. (Note: In 1957 five brothers Sisira (Captain), Raya, Stanley, Percy (Wicket-Keeper), and Tissa from Amendra family played together against Richmond is a world record, which is recognized by the Guinness Book of World Records.) In 1972, Prasad Kariyawasam of Richmond College erased a 33-year-old big match record of 155 runs held by Mahindian Sirisena Hettige, with an unbeaten 156 runs. On the very next day of the same match Mahindians piled up the highest score by a team, when they totaled 359 with their top order batsman P. H. K. H. Ranasinghe scoring 162. It is the current record for the highest individual score by a batsman in the big match series. Jayantha Dias of Richmond College holds the record for most centuries in the big match, scoring consecutive centuries in 1968 & 1969.

== Past results ==
Result (Note: Results of the matches played up to 1976 were obtained from the records kept by Rev. W. J. T. Small of Richmond College, Galle.)	Total	Year(s)
Richmond College (won)	24	1905, 1906, 1907, 1913, 1914, 1915, 1917, 1921, 1922, 1926 (w/o), 1929, 1935, 1940, 1941, 1946, 1947, 1950, 1951, 1958, 1960, 1969, 2014, 2015, 2019
Mahinda College (won)	23	1908, 1909, 1916 (w/o), 1918, 1919, 1920, 1923, 1924, 1925, 1927, 1928, 1932, 1933, 1938, 1939, 1943, 1944, 1949, 1962, 1966, 1976, 1978, 2008
Match drawn	69	1930, 1931, 1934, 1936, 1937, 1945, 1948, 1952, 1953, 1954, 1955, 1956, 1957, 1959, 1961, 1963, 1964, 1965, 1967, 1968, 1970, 1971, 1972, 1973, 1974, 1975, 1977, 1979, 1980, 1981, 1982, 1983, 1984, 1985, 1986, 1987, 1988, 1989, 1990, 1991, 1992, 1993, 1994, 1995, 1996, 1997, 1998, 1999, 2000, 2001, 2002, 2003, 2004, 2005, 2006, 2007, 2009, 2010, 2011, 2012, 2013, 2016, 2017, 2018, 2022, 2023, 2024, 2025, 2026
No match	6	1910, 1911, 1912, 1942, 2020, 2021

- (w/o) - Walkover

== Past records ==
=== Notable performances ===
Name	School	Performance	Record / Remarks	Year
P. S. Thuduwewatta	Richmond	6 for 19 & 5 for 23	First 10-wicket match haul of the series	1917
Sirisena Hettige	Mahinda	155 runs	First century of the series	1939
R. M. M. de Silva	Richmond	8 for 19 & 7 for 6	Best bowling performance of a match	1922
S. Ambawatte	Mahinda	10 for 44	Best bowling performance in an innings	1953
S. Ambawatte	Mahinda	103* runs, 10 for 44 & 5 for 61	Best all-round performance of the series	1953
R. M. M. de Silva	Richmond	97 runs, 8 for 19 & 7 for 6	Best all-round performance of the series	1922
Basil Gunasekara	Mahinda	99* runs	First player to stranded on 99	1944
Jayantha Dias	Richmond	111 runs & 117 runs	First and only player to score consecutive centuries	1968 & 1969
Gajaba Pitigala	Mahinda	3 five wicket hauls in consecutive years	Most consecutive five wicket hauls	1978, 1979 & 1980
P. H. K. H. Ranasinghe	Mahinda	162 runs	Highest individual score in an innings	1972
Prasad Kariyawasam	Richmond	316 runs (156* in 1972)	Highest aggregate of runs in the series	1969-1972
S. Ambawatte	Mahinda	30 + wickets	Highest aggregate of wickets in the series	1949-1953
Malsha Tharupathi	Richmond	100 off Just 70 balls	Fastest Century in the History of Lover’s Quarrel	2024

- * - Remained not out

=== Centuries ===
Name	School	Score	Year
Sirisena Hettige	Mahinda	155 runs	1939
Somasiri Ambawatte	Mahinda	103* runs	1953
Jayantha Dias	Richmond	111 runs	1968
Jayantha Dias	Richmond	117 runs	1969
Prasad Kariyawasam	Richmond	156* runs	1972
P. H. K. H. Ranasinghe	Mahinda	162 runs	1972
Ruwan Korala	Richmond	102 runs	1981
C. Hewamanna	Richmond	102 runs	1987
Chandima Mendis	Richmond	129 runs	1988
Dhammika Sudarshana	Richmond	100* runs	1995
Thushara Rupasinghe	Mahinda	109 runs	1998
Mohammed Faizer	Richmond	115 runs	2002
A. K. Tyronne	Richmond	137 runs	2014
Charith Asalanka	Richmond	100 runs	2015
Dhananjaya Lakshan	Richmond	102* runs	2017
Dhanuja Induwara	Mahinda	101 runs	2023
Chehan Subasinghe	Richmond	100 runs	2024
Malsha Tharupathi	Richmond	111 runs	2024
Dinura Kalupahana	Mahinda	124 runs	2024
Dineth Gunawardhana	Mahinda	124 runs	2026

== See also ==
- Cricket in Sri Lanka
- Big Match
