= Mahinda Samarasinghe =

Sri Lankan politician and diplomat

Hon. Mahinda Samarasinghe Ambassador
- මහින්ද සමරසිංහ மகிந்த சமரசிங்க

Ambassador of Sri Lanka to the United States and Mexico
- Incumbent
- Assumed office 6 Dec 2021
- President: Gotabaya Rajapaksa; Ranil Wickremesinghe; Anura Kumara Dissanayake
- Prime Minister: Mahinda Rajapaksa; Ranil Wickremesinghe; Dinesh Gunawardena; Harini Amarasuriya
- Preceded by: Ravinatha P. Aryasinha

Minister of Ports and Shipping (Sri Lanka)
- In office 2017–2019
- President: Maithripala Sirisena
- Prime Minister: Ranil Wickremesinghe

Minister of Skills Development and Vocational Training
- In office 2015–2017
- President: Maithripala Sirisena
- Prime Minister: Ranil Wickremesinghe

Member of Parliament for Kalutara District
- In office 1994–2021
- Succeeded by: Lalith Varna Kumara

Personal details
- Born: 30 January 1956 (age 70)
- Party: Sri Lanka Freedom Party (2006–2021); United National Party (1988–2006)
- Other political affiliations: Sri Lanka People's Freedom Alliance (2019–present); United People's Freedom Alliance (2006–2019); United National Front (2001–2006)
- Spouse: Rosemary Samarasinghe
- Children: Sean Samarasinghe; Jackie Samarasinghe
- Education: La Trobe University
- Occupation: Ambassador
- Profession: Diplomat

His Excellency Mahinda Buddhadasa Samarasinghe (Sinhala: මහින්ද බුද්ධදාස සමරසිංහ; born 30 January 1956) is a former MP and the current Ambassador of Sri Lanka to the United States and Mexico and High Commissioner to Trinidad and Tobago. Prior to his diplomatic appointment, he had a long career in Sri Lankan politics.

He was formerly a member of Parliament from the Kalutara Electoral District as a member of the Sri Lanka Podujana Peramuna, and the SLPP chief organiser for the Panadura Electorate in Kalutara. However, he is no longer affiliated with the Sri Lanka Podujana Peramuna.

== Education ==
Mahinda Samarasinghe completed a Bachelor of Economics (Honours) degree at La Trobe University, Melbourne, Australia.

== Diplomatic career ==
Having joined the Sri Lanka Overseas Service, he served as the First Secretary to the Sri Lanka High Commission in Australia and as Counselor for the Sri Lankan Permanent Mission to the United Nations in Geneva during the 1980s. He has represented Sri Lanka at the International Labour Organization, World Health Organization, International Telecommunication Union and the World Meteorological Organisation. While working at the Sri Lanka Mission in Geneva, he represented Sri Lanka at almost all of the Governing Body meetings of the International Labour Organization in 1986 and 1987, as well as the International Labour Conference from 1985 to 1987. At the end of the 1987 ILC, he successfully presented a draft resolution on ‘Workers Housing,' which was adopted at the conference.

In late 2021, Samarasinghe was appointed as Sri Lanka's Ambassador to the United States, Mexico and Trinidad and Tobago.

== Human rights ==
As co-chair of the Permanent Standing Committee on Human Rights in Sri Lanka, Samarasinghe works in close cooperation with several UN Organisations including the United Nations Human Rights Commission (UNHRC), United Nations Development Programme, United Nations Children's Fund (UNICEF) and International Labour Organization, as well as other international organizations such as the International Organization for Migration to continue Sri Lanka's endeavors to rehabilitate and reintegrate citizens from the country's formerly war-torn areas. He also acted as a member of the Advisory Committee to the Human rights task force of Sri Lanka while being the Executive member of the parliamentary group for the protection and promotion of human rights.

From 2002-2004, Samarasinghe was the Chair of the Parliamentary Select Committee to review the mandate and functioning of the Human Rights Commission of Sri Lanka. He also chaired national coordination mechanisms on human rights and humanitarian assistance during the armed conflict, from 2006 - 2009. In 2006, Mahinda Samarasinghe was offered a position to handle the Disaster Management & Human Rights portfolio by the then Sri Lankan president, Mahinda Rajapaksa.

As the leader of the Sri Lankan Delegation to the UN Human Rights Council (Special and Regular Sessions) up to 2014, Samarasinghe was also responsible for formulating national reports for the Universal Periodic Review of Sri Lanka in both 2008 and 2012.

== Political career ==
Samarasinghe entered active politics in 1988 and was elected to the Provincial Council of the Western Province, where he served as the Leader of the House of the Provincial Council and the Provincial Minister of Health and Economic Infrastructure. During his tenure, he took the initiative to establish the Road Passenger Transport Authority and the Provincial Road Development Authority.

In 1994 he was elected to parliament from the Kalutara District, and was re-elected in subsequent elections held in 2000, 2001, 2004, 2010, 2015 and 2020.

From 2001 to 2004, Samarasinghe served as the Cabinet Minister of Employment and Labour and the Chief Government Whip. From 2004 to 2006, he then served as the Chief Opposition Whip.

Samarasinghe joined the Sri Lanka Freedom Party in 2006 and became the Sri Lanka Freedom Party chief organiser for the Agalawatta Electorate in Kalutara District. He also served as Cabinet Minister of Disaster Management and Human Rights from 2006 to 2010 and Minister of Plantation Industries from 2010 to 2015. He was a member of the Parliamentary Consultative Committees of the Ministries of Trade, Commerce, Industries, Finance and Foreign Affairs. In 2015, under the government of then-incumbent president Maithripala Sirisena, Samarasinghe was appointed as the State Minister for Finance.

In 2016, Samarasinghe was selected to be the Chair of the Parliamentary Sub-Committee on Fundamental Rights, Language and Citizenship Rights, Steering Committee on Constitutional Reform. He was then appointed as the Ports and Shipping Minister in 2017.

Samarasinghe resigned from his seat in parliament in late November 2021 to assume office as the Ambassador of Sri Lanka to the United States, Mexico and Trinidad and Tobago. He was replaced by Lalith Varna Kumara.

National Executive
Position	Period
Minister of Employment & Labour	2001-2004
Minister of Disaster Management & Human rights	2006-2010
Minister of Plantation Industries	2010-2015
Minister of State for Finance	2015
Minister of Skills Development & Vocational Training	2015-2017
Minister of Ports & Shipping	2017-2019
Minister of State for Public Administration and Home Affairs	2019-2020

== Personal life ==
Samarasinghe’s mother is Yvonne Senevirathne. He is married and has four children.

== Non-Aligned Movement Summit (2016) ==
In September 2016, Mahinda Samarasinghe, serving as the Minister of Skills Development and Vocational Training, led the Sri Lankan delegation to the 17th Summit of the Non-Aligned Movement (NAM) held in Margarita Island, Venezuela. He attended the Ministerial segment of the Summit from 15–16 September 2016 as the Special Envoy of President Maithripala Sirisena.

The Summit focused on issues such as UN reform, terrorism, sustainable development, climate change, and global peace and security. Sri Lanka, a founding member of NAM, was represented by Minister Samarasinghe along with senior officials from the Ministry of Foreign Affairs.

== Parliamentary work ==
During his time in Parliament, Samarasinghe held several key positions and chaired multiple committees:

- Chair, Parliamentary Sub-Committee on Fundamental Rights, Language and Citizenship Rights, Steering Committee on Constitutional Reform (2016)
- Chair, Parliamentary Select Committee on Man-Made Disasters (2006–2009)
- Chair, Parliamentary Select Committee on Natural Disasters (2005)
- Chair, Parliamentary Select Committee to Investigate the Functioning of the Human Rights Commission of Sri Lanka (2002–2004)
- Chair, Consultative Committees of Parliament for Ministries under his purview during his tenure as Cabinet Minister
- Chief Government Whip, Parliament of Sri Lanka (2001–2004)
- Chief Opposition Whip (2004–2006)
- Member, Parliamentary Consultative Committees of the Ministries of Trade and Commerce; Finance; Foreign Affairs; and Industries

== See also ==
- Sri Lankan Non Career Diplomats
- Cabinet of Sri Lanka

== Sources ==
- Address by Hon. Mahinda Samarasinghe at the First Session of the Human Rights Council – Geneva - 19 June 2006
- Sri Lanka: New rulers have bloody past
- Panos South Asia at the International Conference on Disaster research & Ethics in Colombo, Sri Lanka
- Lanka to raise UN HR Commissioner’s partiality - Minister Mahinda Samarasinghe
- Ambassador Appointed of Sri Lanka to the United States, Mahinda Samarasinghe assumes duties
