= Lalith Varna Kumara =

Sri Lankan politician

Hon. Lalith Varna Kumara MP MPC

Member of Parliament for Kalutara District
- In office 30 November 2021 – 24 September 2024
- Preceded by: Mahinda Samarasinghe

Member of the Western Provincial Council
- In office 2009–2014

Personal details
- Born: 7 October 1974 (age 51)
- Citizenship: Sri Lankan
- Party: Sri Lanka Podujana Peramuna

Lalith Varna Kumara is a Sri Lankan politician and former member of the Sri Lankan parliament from the Kalutara Electoral District as a member of the Sri Lanka Podujana Peramuna.

He was appointed as a member of the parliament on 30 November 2021 after Kalutara MP Mahinda Samarasinghe resigned from his seat to take up the office of Ambassador of Sri Lanka to the United States and Mexico.
