= Namini Wijedasa =

Sri Lankan investigative journalist

- Namini Wijedasa attending the IWOC Ceremony 2025
- Occupation: Investigative journalist
- Years active: 1994 — present
- Awards: International Women of Courage Award (2025)

Namini Wijedasa is a Sri Lankan investigative journalist. She is the deputy editor of The Sunday Times in Sri Lanka. Since the beginning of her career, she has worked for Daily Mirror, The Island, Lakbima News, Associated Press, The Economist, and NHK Japan. Wijedasa's work focuses on the politics of Sri Lanka, including its civil war and governmental corruption.

== Early life ==
Wijedasa was born to a Sri Lankan Tamil family. She spent a portion of her childhood in Bahrain among the South Asian community there, where she remarked there was little animosity towards people of a different Sri Lankan ethnicity, despite the Sri Lankan civil war occurring in their home country. She returned to Sri Lanka at the age of 14.

== Career ==
Wijedasa started working as a journalist in 1994, covering Sri Lanka's civil war for The Island. In 2005, she won two Lorenzo Natali Prizes for her work on covering the recruitment of child soldiers. She is the only journalist to receive the D.R. Wijewardene Award for 'Earning the Appreciation of Peers and the Public' twice, once in 2006 and 2016. She is the Sri Lankan correspondent for the British newspaper The Economist.

Wijedasa joined The Sunday Times in 2012, where she works to this day. In 2013, she spoke at the 5th Sri Lanka Unites Future Leaders’ Conference in Galle. In 2021, Wijedasa was inducted to the International Consortium of Investigative Journalists as a distinguished member, marking her as the second Sri Lankan person to receive this honor.

Wijedasa was awarded the International Women of Courage Award (IWOC) by the United States Secretary of State in 2025 for her commitment to exposing corruption in Sri Lanka. While in the United States, she visited the Sri Lankan embassy and met with Ambassador Samarasinghe.

At the ceremony, Wijedasa said "The impact I want to have is not to change governments. I want systems to change. I want laws to be put in place. I want institutions to be strengthened so that people are not able to abuse them, and that is what we have, as investigative journalists, always fought for, and that's what I will keep fighting for."

After winning the IWOC award, Wijedasa was honored in her home country by multiple groups. First, she was invited to speak by the Tamil-Speaking Women Journalists Association at the Rainbow Institute in Colombo, Sri Lanka. During the event, she said that "It's not easy being a journalist in Sri Lanka — and it's especially hard when you're asking questions that make people uncomfortable." She was also honored by the South Asian Women in Media group, where she discussed being a role model for the next generation of Sri Lankan women.

== Awards ==
- Lorenzo Natali Grand Prize (2005)
- Lorenzo Natali Prize for the Asia-Pacific region (2005)
- D.R. Wijewardene Award for 'Earning the Appreciation of Peers and the Public' (2006)
- D.R. Wijewardene Award for 'Earning the Appreciation of Peers and the Public' (2016)
- International Women of Courage Award (IWOC) (2025)
