= Merenna Francis de Silva Jayaratne =

Sri Lankan civil servant and diplomat

Merenna Francis de Silva Jayaratne, CCS (born 12 July 1904) was a Sri Lankan civil servant and diplomat. He was the Ceylonese Ambassador to the United States, Ceylonese Permanent Representative to the United Nations and Permanent Secretary of the Ministry of Transport and Works.

Having gained BA degree from the University of London, Jayaratne joined the Ceylon Civil Service in 1927. He served as a cadet in the Colombo Kachcheri and served as office assistant to the Assistant Government Agent, Matale. He then served as a Police Magistrate of Jaffna; office assistant Badulla Kachcheri; Assistant Government Agent, Mullaittivu; Secretary to the Minister of Agriculture and Lands; Assistant Government Agent, Matara; Assistant Government Agent, Nuwara Eliya; Deputy Controller of Textiles; Director of Commerce and Acting Director of Educatation. He was appointed Permanent Secretary to the Ministry of Commerce and Trade in 1951 and Permanent Secretary Ministry of Transport and Works in 1953. He succeeded William Gopallawa as Ceylon's Ambassador to the United States from 1963 to 1965 and thereafter its Permanent Representative to the United Nations from 1965 to 1967.

== See also ==
- Sri Lankan Non Career Diplomats
