= Stephen Jones (cricketer) =

South African cricketer (born 1955)

Personal information
- Born: 14 April 1955 (age 71); Cape Town, South Africa
- Source: Cricinfo, 1 December 2020

Stephen Jones (born 14 April 1955) is a former South African cricket player and coach. He played in 81 first-class and 35 List A matches for Boland and Western Province from 1974/75 to 1987/88.

== Coaching career ==
Jones ended his playing career as a player-coach with Boland B. He later coached in Namibia before returning to South Africa where he coached Border. He was head coach of South Africa A for a tour of Zimbabwe in 1994, and also coached the national under-19 team on tours of England and India in the mid-1990s.

In 2003, Jones was appointed head cricket coach at Harrow School in England. In February 2004 he was also appointed head coach of the South Africa women's national cricket team. On a 2004 school tour of Sri Lanka, he and his students were caught up in the Boxing Day Tsunami while playing against a local school at Galle International Stadium. The players and spectators had to shelter on the roof of the stadium for several hours, with the stepfather of Spencer Crawley – one of the Harrow students – being killed.

Jones coached South Africa to the 2005 Women's Cricket World Cup, which South Africa hosted. The team won only a single match and failed to secure automatic qualification for the next World Cup, leading Jones to publicly criticise Cricket South Africa for its lack of assistance for women's cricket.
