= Kalidas Nag =

Indian historian, author and parliamentarian

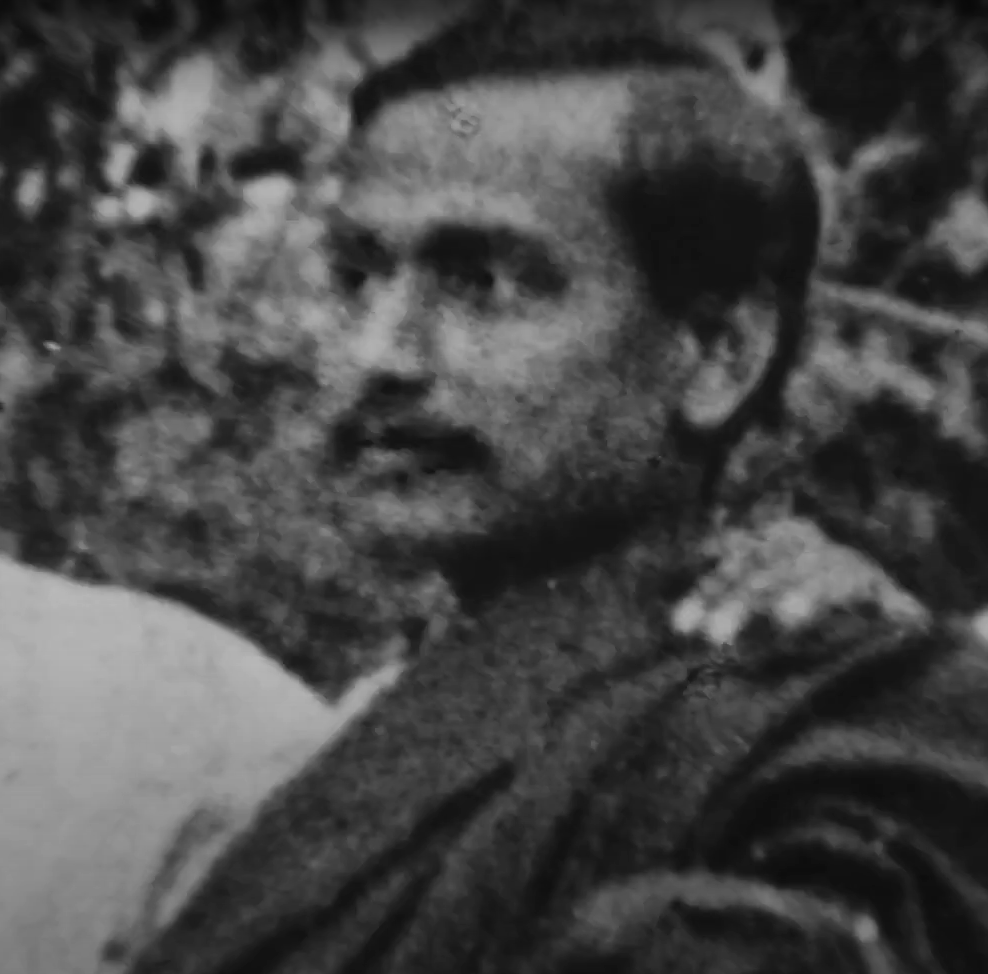

Member of Parliament, Rajya Sabha
- In office 1952–1954

Personal details
- Education: University of Calcutta; University of Paris

Kalidas Nag (Bengali: Kalidas Nag; 16 January 1892 – 9 November 1966) was an Indian historian, writer and parliamentarian. He was nominated to the Rajya Sabha in 1952 and served till 1954.

== Early years ==
Kalidas Nag was born to Babu Matilal Nag in Calcutta. He married Shrimati Santa Devi, daughter of Ramananda Chatterjee. Together they had three daughters.

== Education and career ==
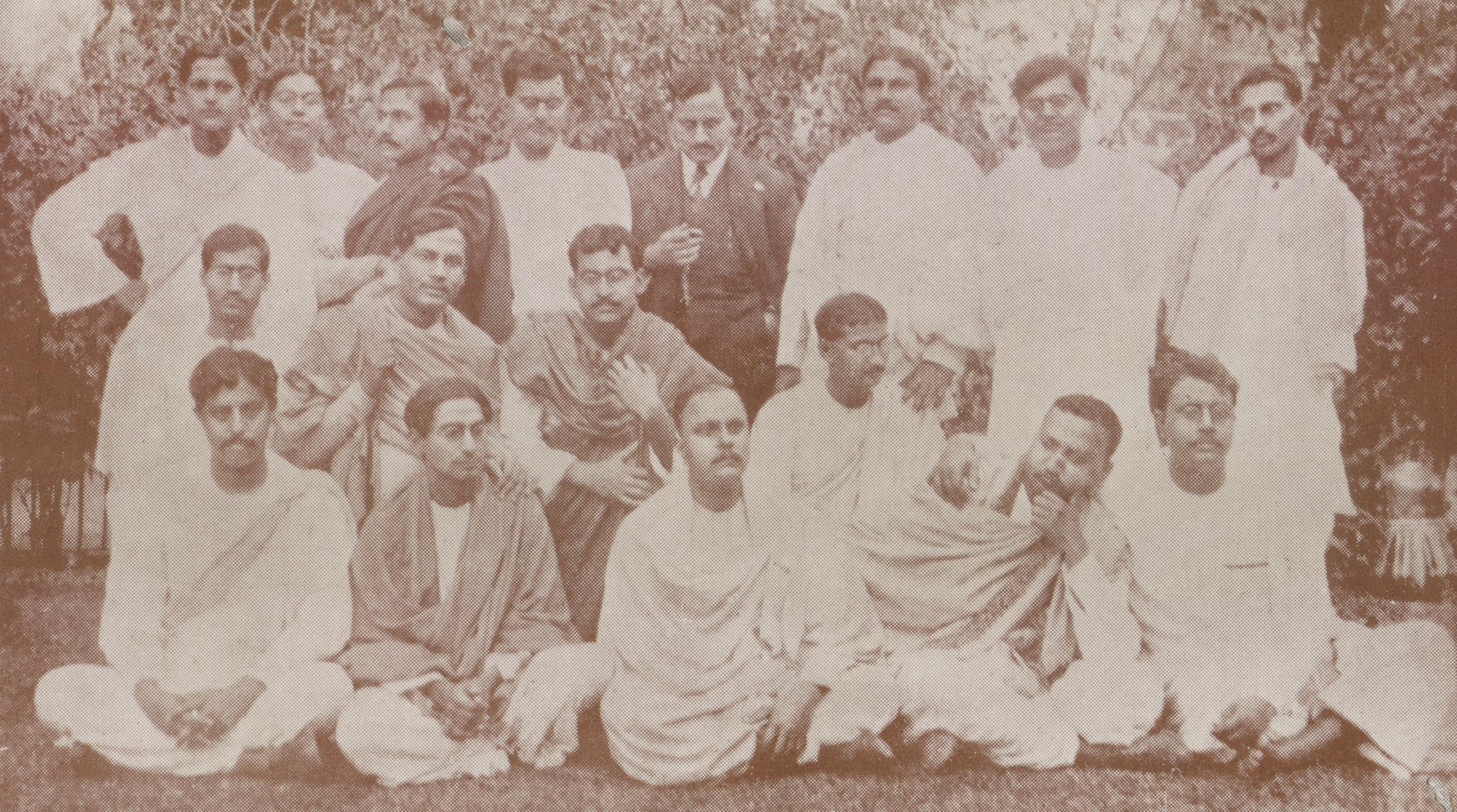
Kalidas Nag in a group photo of Monday Club founded by Sukumar Roy First row sitting from left: Subinoy Ray, Prasanta Chandra Mahalanobis, Atul Prasad Sen, Shishir Kumar Datta, Sukumar Ray Middle row from left: Jatindranath Mukhopadhyay, Amal Home, Suniti Kumar Chattopadhyay, Jibanmoy Roy Standing from left: Hiran Sanyal, Ajitkumar Chakrabarty, Kalidas Nag, Pravat Chandra Gangoadhyay, Dr. Dwijendranath Maitra, Satish Chandra Chattopadhyay, Shrish Chandra Sen, Girija Shankar Roy Choudhury

After graduating in history from the Scottish Church College, he earned a postgraduate degree from the University of Calcutta, and a doctorate from the University of Paris. A prolific author, he taught history at the Scottish Church College and University of Calcutta, and was nominated as an Officer d’ Academic by the Government of France. He served as the principal of Mahinda College in Galle, Ceylon from 1919 to 1920.

Following studies in Paris, Nag co-founded the Calcutta-based Greater India Society and became one of its main driving forces in the late 1920s and 1930s. In the 1920s he was a supporter of the French contribution to Tagore's university project at Santiniketan (north of Calcutta). He later edited several books on Indian culture. In 1930, Nag was a visiting professor at the Carnegie Institute in New York. After travels across Australia, New Zealand, the Philippines and Hawaii, Nag developed an interest in the transoceanic connections that linked Polynesia and Vedic India, and he became a pioneer in Indo-Pacific studies

== International exchanges ==
Nag had major correspondence and intellectual relationships with two formidable European intellectuals, Romain Rolland and Hermann Hesse. Nag had famously narrated the story of the life of the Buddha to Hesse at a conference, which became the basis for Hesse's novel Siddhartha.

== Bibliography ==
Kalidas Nag, Art and Archaeology Abroad. A Report Intended Primarily for Indian Students Desiring to Specialize in Those Subjects in the Research Centres of Europe and America. Calcutta, 1937.

Kalidas Nag (1957). Discovery of Asia, The Institute of Asian African Relations, Calcutta.

Kalidas Nag, Memoirs, 2 vols. Writers Workshop, 1991.

Yorim Spoelder, Visions of Greater India: Transimperial Knowledge and Anti-Colonial Nationalism, c. 1800-1960. Cambridge: Cambridge University Press, 2024

== Sources ==
- Brief biodata at Rajya Sabha
