= Galle International Stadium =

Cricket stadium in Sri Lanka

- The Esplanade
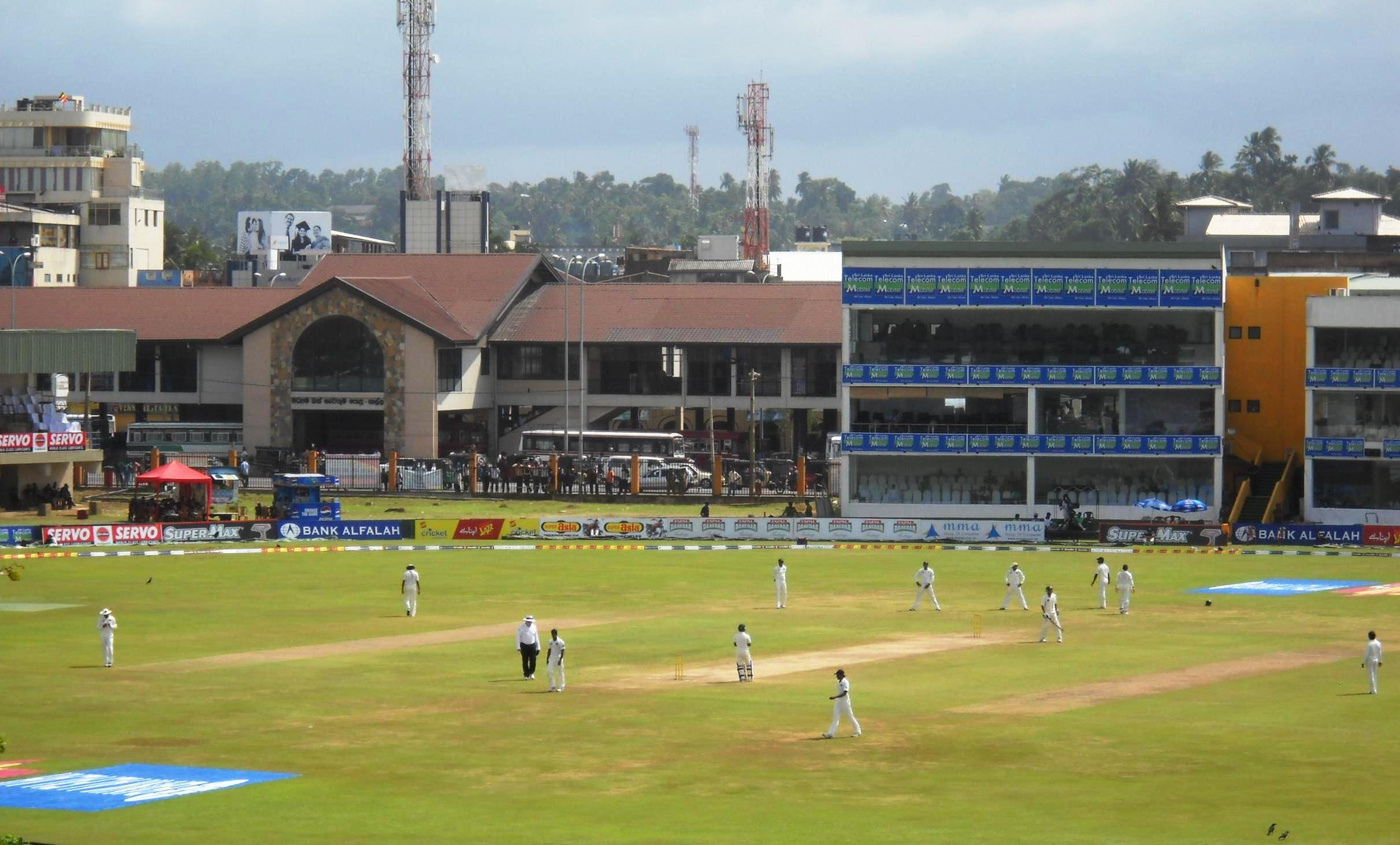
- Interactive map of Galle International Stadium

Ground information
- Location: Galle, Sri Lanka
- Country: Sri Lanka
- Coordinates: 6°01′54″N 80°12′58″E
- Establishment: 1876; 150 years ago
- Capacity: 35,000
- Owner: Galle Cricket Club
- Tenants: Sri Lanka Cricket; Galle Cricket Club
- End names
- City End; Fort End

International information
- First men's Test: 3–7 June 1998: Sri Lanka v New Zealand
- Last men's Test: 15–19 August 2026: Sri Lanka v India
- First men's ODI: 22 August 1999: Sri Lanka v Australia
- Last men's ODI: 2 July 2017: Sri Lanka v Zimbabwe
- First women's ODI: 11 September 2018: Sri Lanka v India
- Last women's ODI: 3 July 2023: Sri Lanka v New Zealand
- First women's T20I: 26 September 2012: Sri Lanka v South Africa
- Last women's T20I: 1 October 2012: Australia v England

Team information
| Galle Cricket Club | (1876–present) |
- As of 21 June 2025; Source: Cricinfo

Galle International Stadium (Sinhala: ගාල්ල ජාත්‍යන්තර ක්‍රිකට් ක්‍රීඩාංගණය, Tamil: காலி பன்னாட்டு அரங்கம்) is a cricket stadium in Galle, Sri Lanka, situated near Galle Fort and fringed on two sides by the Indian Ocean. It is considered to be one of the most picturesque cricket grounds in the world. Before being brought up to international cricket standards, it was known as 'The Esplanade', and is the home ground of the Galle Cricket Club. This stadium is identified as one of the luckiest venues for the Sri Lankan national cricket team.

== History ==
The ground was built in 1876 as a race course. There was no permanent pavilion until 1892, when a 'grand stand' was built according to a suggestion of P. A. Templer, the then Secretary of the Galle Municipal Council. Eventually the racing ceased and the ground was used for cricket matches more than races.

The first school cricket match played at this venue, then known as the 'Galle Esplanade' dates back to May 1888, was between Richmond College, Galle and All Saints' College, Galle. The Richmond-Mahinda Annual Cricket Encounter was begun in 1905 at this venue and it is one of the longest cricket match series in Sri Lanka, having been played for over 100 years. In 1927, the ground was officially declared as a cricket stadium.

The ground hosted its first first-class match on 29 February 1984. A turf wicket was introduced to the stadium in 1945 under the guidance of Dhanapala Lorensu Hewa, who was then Secretary of the Galle Cricket Ground. The assistance of the Colombo Cricket Club was also taken for this.

The ground was later upgraded to international cricket standards, and became the seventh international cricket stadium in Sri Lanka able to host Test matches. The first test match was played on the ground on 3 June 1998. It was played between Sri Lanka and New Zealand, resulting in a win for Sri Lanka by an innings and 16 runs. The first ODI match was scheduled to be held on 25 June 1998 between India and Sri Lanka, but was abandoned due to the ground being waterlogged from overnight rain and heavy raining in the morning.

On 26 December 2004, the ground was devastated by the tsunami resulting from the Indian Ocean earthquake, with flood waters up to 30 metres deep. The tsunami occurred during a school cricket match between St. Aloysius' College and visiting English team Harrow School (coached by Stephen Jones), with players and spectators forced to shelter on the roof of the stadium for several hours. Most of the buildings in the stadium were destroyed, and the ground was damaged substantially. In the weeks that followed the flooding, the stadium became a temporary shelter for hundreds of people displaced by the tsunami. A temporary refugee camp and a helipad were constructed there in order to assist the survivors.

Renovation of the Galle International Stadium began on 8 May 2006. The ambitious renovation involved numerous new buildings, including a new pavilion and a media centre. The seating capacity for spectators was also increased. The re-constructed stadium was opened by President Mahinda Rajapakse on 17 December 2007. On the same day as the re-opening of the stadium started the first Test match between Sri Lanka and England, which ended in a draw.

The Galle Stadium is also noted for the fact that in 2010 it was the stadium that hosted the last match of arguably one of the finest cricketers produced by Sri Lanka, Muttiah Muralitharan. Muralitharan needed eight wickets to reach the 800 Test wickets mark. His first wicket of the match and 793rd casualty overall was Sachin Tendulkar. He then took a further four wickets in the first innings of that Test match. In the second innings, he took two wickets quickly, but had to bowl a long spell to finally get his 800th wicket, which was that of Pragyan Ojha, who was caught by Mahela Jayawardene at first slip.

On 11 March 2017, the stadium witnessed another milestone for one of the greatest ever left-arm spinners. Rangana Herath became the most successful left-arm spinner in Test cricket history by surpassing 362 wickets by Daniel Vettori after he dismissed Bangladeshi Litton Das.

In June 2017, Sri Lanka Cricket announced that Galle will host its first One-Day International after 20 years, when Zimbabwe tour Sri Lanka. The first two ODIs were held on 30 June and 2 July. In the first ODI, Zimbabwe won the match posting the highest ODI chase ever on Sri Lankan soil. The first ODI century at the venue was scored by Zimbabwean opener Solomon Mire in that match.

== Ground information ==
The ground conditions generally favours spin bowling, and as such is considered favourable to the Sri Lankan side which has several good spin bowlers and also a batting line up that is good at playing against spin bowling. This idea is supported by the fact that Sri Lanka has won 12 of the 23 Test matches that have been held at the stadium. The ground is adjacent to a Dutch built fort and is bordered by the sea on two sides.

The ground covers an area of 4.216 hectares, the distance from the wicket to the boundary being 75 yards and blue grass is used on the turf. The stadium includes three indoor practice nets and four outdoor nets. The average first innings score in the Galle international stadium is 340. Harsha Munasinghe is the current ground manager. The former ground manager was Jayananda Warnaweera.

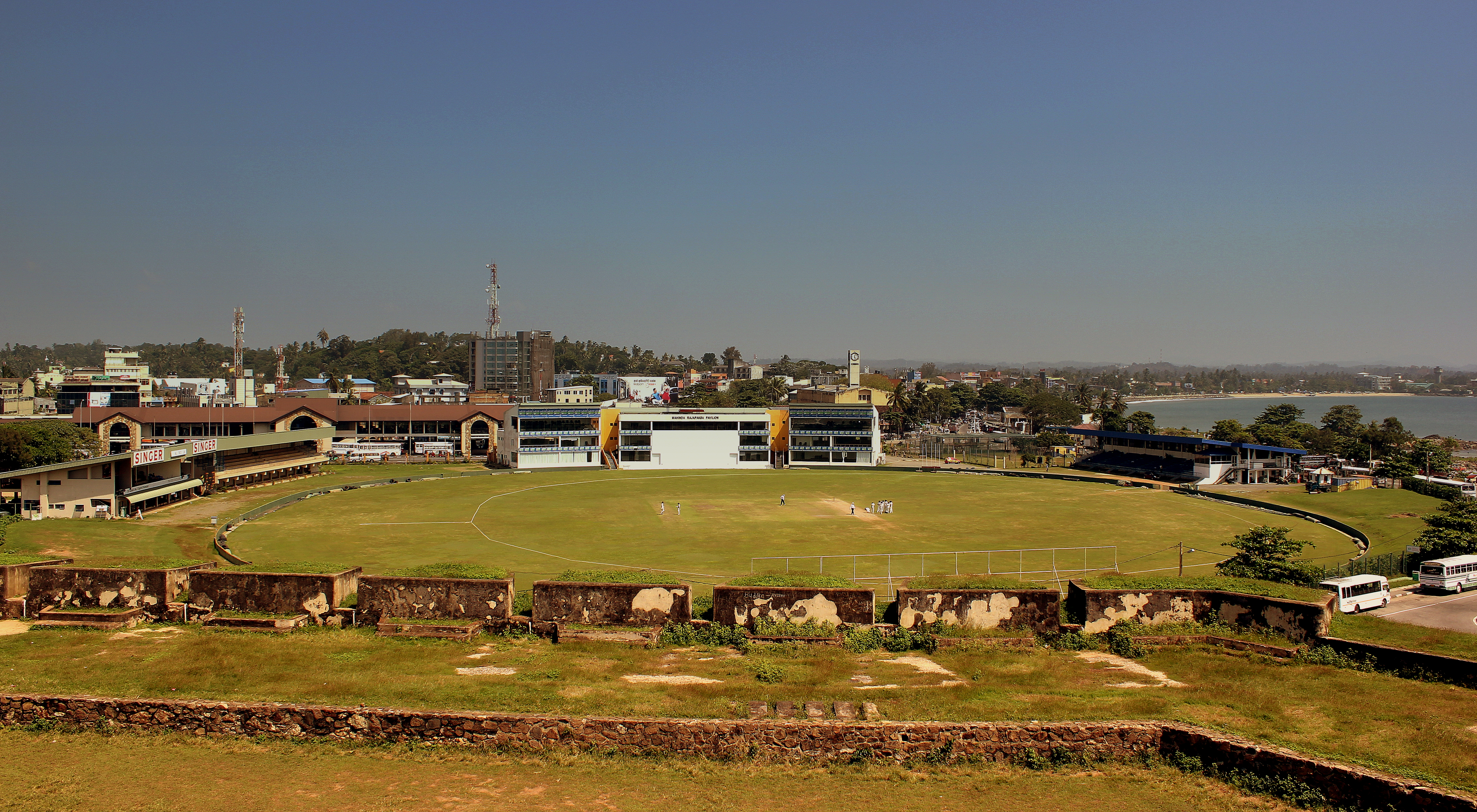
View of the stadium from the old Dutch Fort, 2013

=== Mahinda Rajapaksa pavilion ===
This pavilion was a new addition to the stadium during the post-tsunami renovations. It is named after the Sri Lankan president Mahinda Rajapaksa who gave the clearance for the reconstruction to begin at a stage when the future of the stadium had been uncertain. This pavilion can provide seating for up to 500 VIP guests. It also contains a media centre that can hold 150 media personnel, and is equipped with two TV control rooms and a radio commentators' room. The dressing rooms of the two teams are also in this pavilion.

=== Galle Cricket Club pavilion ===
The Galle Cricket Club pavilion was formerly the main pavilion of the stadium, and was opened on 18 September 1955. This was constructed with the money collected from a lottery organized by the Galle Cricket Club. The Galle Gymkhana Club also made a significant contribution to the construction of this pavilion.

== Controversies ==
The reconstruction of the ground had been reconsidered by the Sri Lanka Cricket and the Sri Lankan government mainly due to some restrictions imposed on constructions on the coastline and also some internal problems within the Sri Lanka cricket board. Suggestions had also been made to construct the stadium at a different location. However the final decision was to renovate the existing stadium. The cost of the reconstruction was approximately Rs. 500,000,000. International support was obtained for this, with considerable assistance provided by Surrey County Cricket Club in England. Additionally, former cricketers Shane Warne (Australia) and Ian Botham (England) also made notable financial contributions.

During the renovations, another problem emerged that threatened to stop the construction. One of the new buildings being constructed blocked the view of the adjacent fort, which is a UNESCO World Heritage Site. The Galle Heritage Foundation and some other organisations expressed concern over this, pointing out that this may result in the fort being removed from the UNESCO World Heritage List. This issue was later resolved and the construction re-continued after some time.

=== Al Jazeera pitch fixing probe ===
The Qatari network Al Jazeera, a documentary claimed that the groundsmen deliberately altered the nature of the pitch in order to produce results that favoured the home team especially during Sri Lanka's test match against Australia in Galle. The news reports claimed that two of the four-pitch fixing offences occurred in Galle, with the groundsmen at Chennai being accused of pitch-fixing charges after hosting the final Test Match of the series between India and England in 2016.

== Other sports ==
=== Rugby ===
In 2013 the SLRFU held the Carlton Rugby 7s tournament at the Galle International Cricket Stadium. The games were held on 27 and 28 July 2013, however there were considerable concerns about potential damage to the central cricket pitches.

== Ground figures ==
=== Key ===
- P Matches Played
- H Matches Won by Home Side
- T Matches Won by Touring Side
- N Matches Won by Neutral Side
- D/N/T Matches Drawn/No Result/Tied

Ground Figures
| Format | P | H | T | N | D/N/T | Inaugural Match |
| Test matches | 50 | 27 | 16 | 0 | 7 | 3 June 1998 |
| One-Day Internationals | 6 | 3 | 2 | 1 | 0 | 22 August 1999 |

Updated 23 August 2026

== Records and statistics ==
=== Teams result summary ===
Test match teams summary
| Team | Span | Match | Won | Lost | Draw | %W | %D | %L |
|---|---|---|---|---|---|---|---|---|
| Sri Lanka | 1998–2021 | 34 | 19 | 8 | 6 | 55.89 | 23.52 | 17.64 |
| England | 2001–2021 | 6 | 2 | 2 | 2 | 33.33 | 33.33 | 33.33 |
| Pakistan | 2000–2023 | 6 | 3 | 3 | 0 | 50 | 0 | 50 |
| India | 2001–2017 | 5 | 2 | 3 | 0 | 40 | 0 | 60 |
| Australia | 1999–2025 | 7 | 4 | 2 | 1 | 57.14 | 14.29 | 28.57 |
| New Zealand | 1998–2019 | 4 | 0 | 4 | 0 | 0 | 0 | 100 |
| South Africa | 2000–2018 | 4 | 1 | 2 | 1 | 25 | 25 | 50 |
| West Indies | 2001–2015 | 3 | 0 | 2 | 1 | 0 | 33.33 | 66.67 |
| Bangladesh | 2013–2017 | 2 | 0 | 1 | 1 | 0 | 50 | 50 |
| Zimbabwe | 2002–2002 | 1 | 0 | 1 | 0 | 0 | 0 | 100 |

ODI match teams summary
| Team | Span | Match | Won | Lost | %W | %L |
|---|---|---|---|---|---|---|
| Sri Lanka | 1999–2017 | 5 | 3 | 2 | 60 | 40 |
| Australia | 1999-1999 | 2 | 2 | 0 | 100 | 0 |
| Zimbabwe | 2017–2017 | 2 | 1 | 1 | 50 | 50 |
| South Africa | 2000–2000 | 1 | 0 | 1 | 0 | 100 |
| India | 1999-1999 | 1 | 0 | 1 | 0 | 100 |
| Pakistan | 2000–2000 | 1 | 0 | 1 | 0 | 100 |

=== Highest innings ===
Highest Team Totals in Tests
| Rank | Team | Score | Overs | Run Rate | Innings | Opposition | Date | Test No. | Report |
|---|---|---|---|---|---|---|---|---|---|
| 1 | Australia | 654/6d | 154.0 | 4.24 | 1 | Sri Lanka | 30 January 2025 | 2579 | (scorecard) |
| 2 | Bangladesh | 638 | 196.0 | 3.25 | 2 | Sri Lanka | 8 March 2013 | 2078 | (scorecard) |
| 3 | Pakistan | 600/8d | 175.2 | 3.42 | 2 | Sri Lanka | 21 June 2000 | 1501 | (scorecard) |
| 4 | India | 600 | 133.1 | 4.51 | 1 | Sri Lanka | 27 July 2017 | 2265 | (scorecard) |
| 5 | Sri Lanka | 590/9d | 202.4 | 2.91 | 2 | West Indies | 13 November 2001 | 1567 | (scorecard) |

=== Lowest innings ===
Lowest Team Totals in Tests
| Rank | Team | Score | Overs | Run Rate | Innings | Opposition | Date | Test No. | Report |
|---|---|---|---|---|---|---|---|---|---|
| 1 | Zimbabwe | 79 | 43.3 | 1.81 | 4 | Sri Lanka | 12 Jan 2002 | 1585 | (scorecard) |
| 2 | England | 81 | 30.5 | 2.62 | 2 | Sri Lanka | 18 Dec 2007 | 1854 | (scorecard) |
| 3 | New Zealand | 88 | 39.5 | 2.20 | 2 | Sri Lanka | 28 Sep 2024 | - | |
| 4 | Pakistan | 100 | 54.3 | 1.83 | 2 | Sri Lanka | 22 Jun 2012 | 2046 | (scorecard) |
| 5 | Sri Lanka | 105 | 50.0 | 2.10 | 2 | Australia | 31 Aug 2011 | 2005 | (scorecard) |
| 6 | Australia | 106 | 33.2 | 3.18 | 2 | Sri Lanka | 5 Aug 2016 | 2213 | (scorecard) |

== Images ==
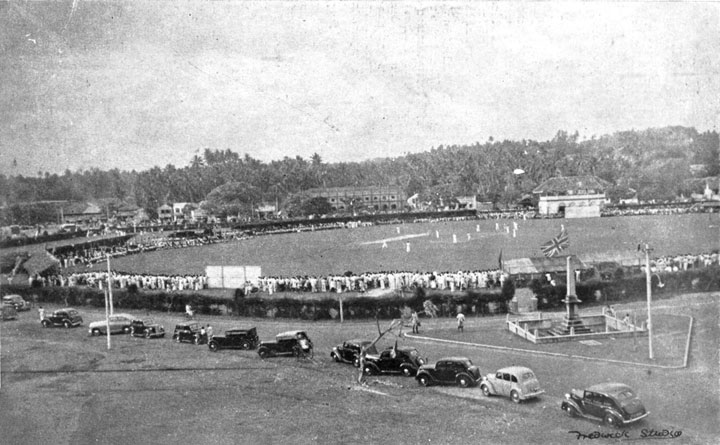
Richmond-Mahinda big match at Galle Esplanade

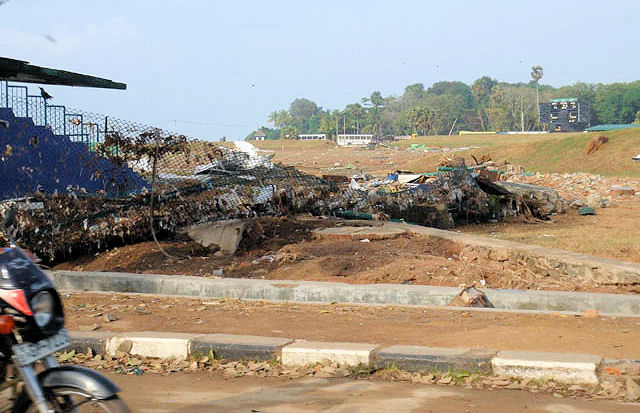
Galle Stadium after Boxing Day tsunami

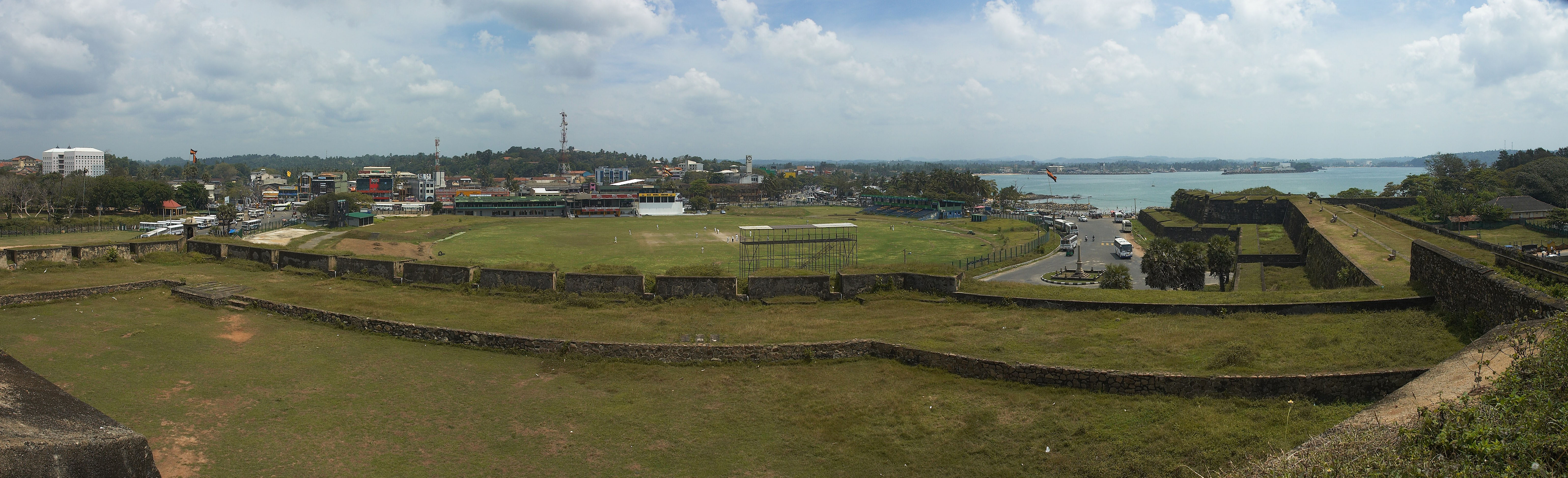
Galle Stadium under construction

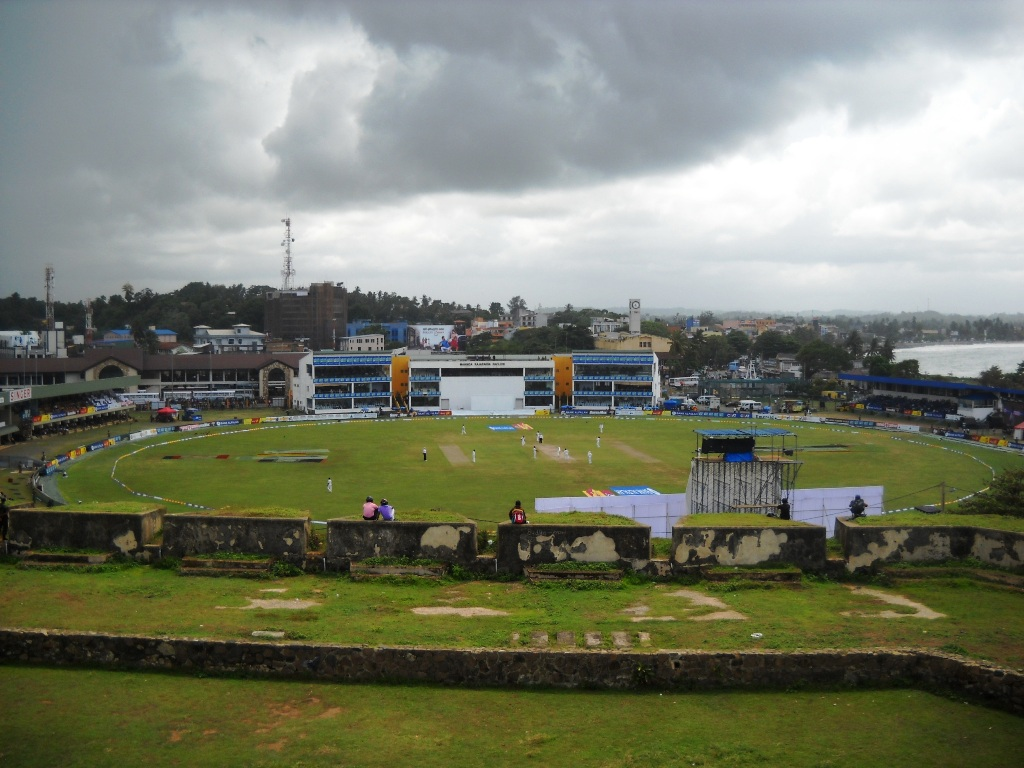
View from old Dutch fort, 2012

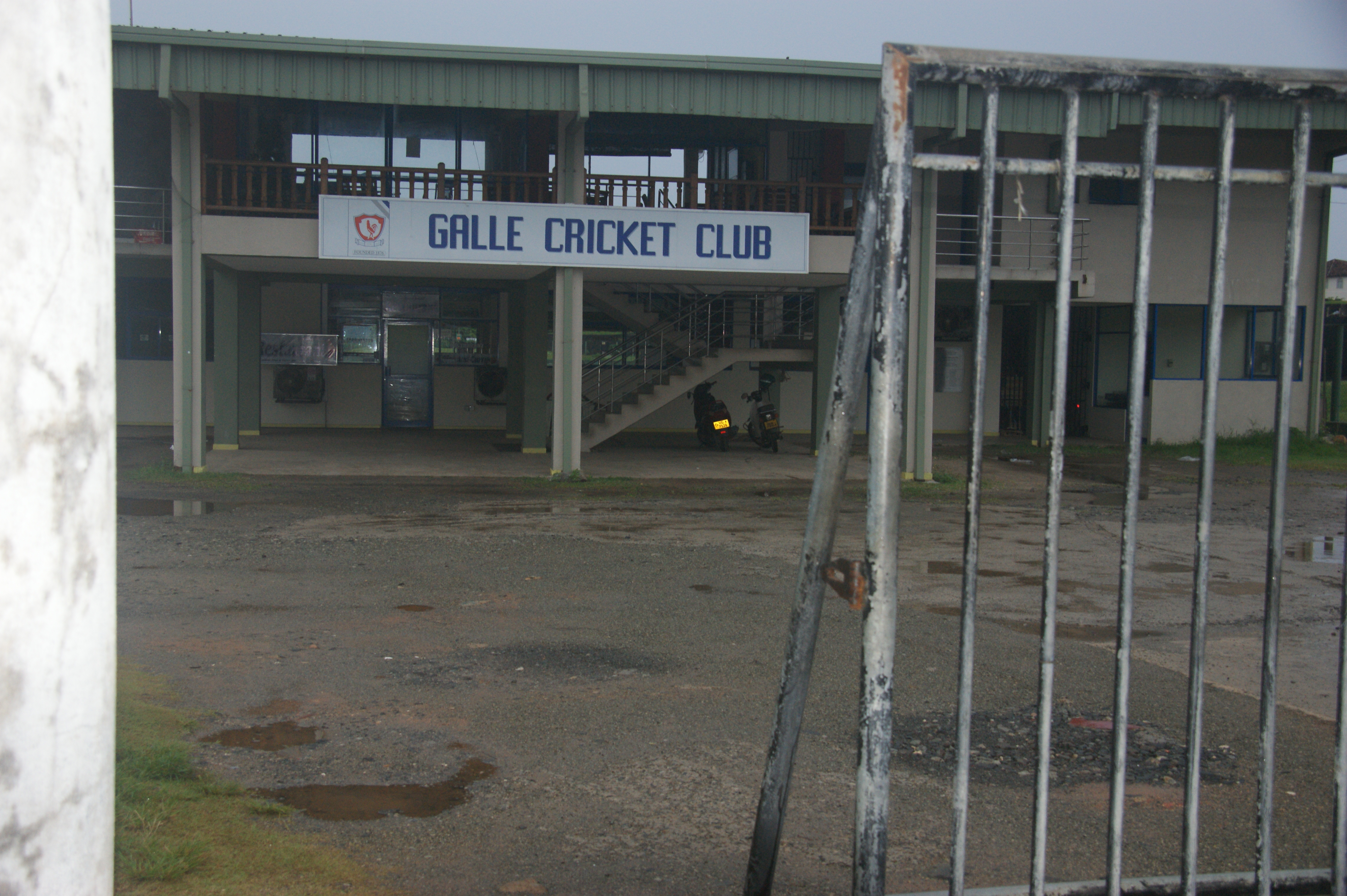
Galle Cricket Club entrance

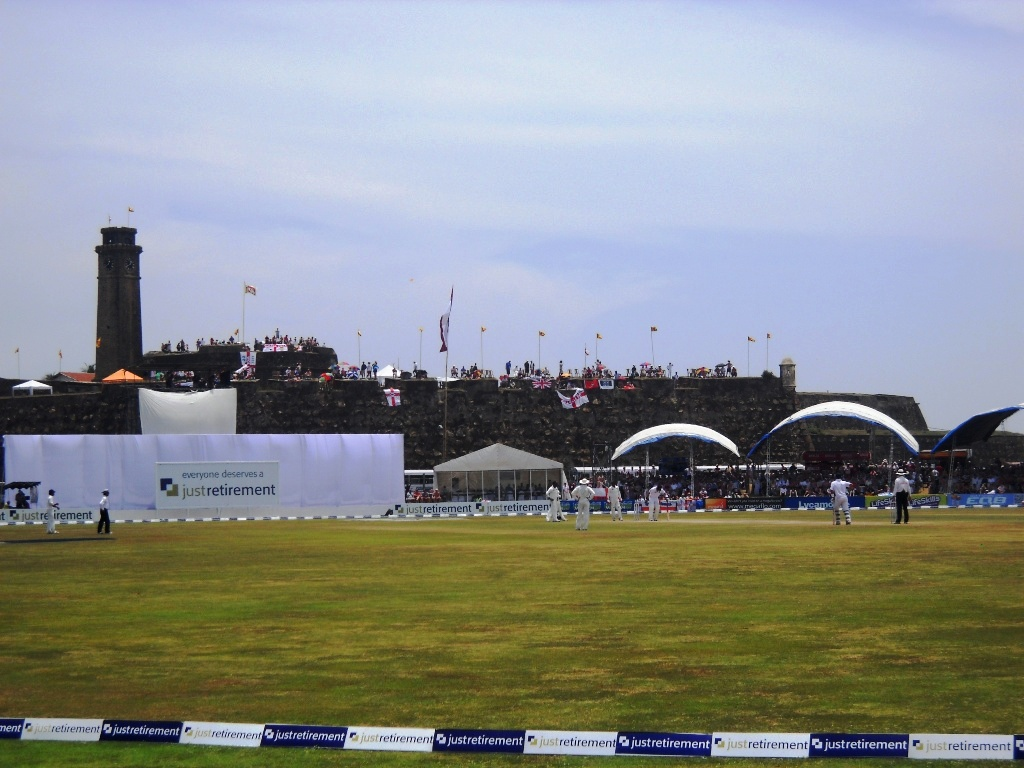
A test match between England and Sri Lanka

== See also ==
- List of international cricket grounds in Sri Lanka
- List of Test cricket grounds
- Richmond–Mahinda Cricket Encounter
