= Prasad Kariyawasam =

Sri Lankan diplomat (born 1954)

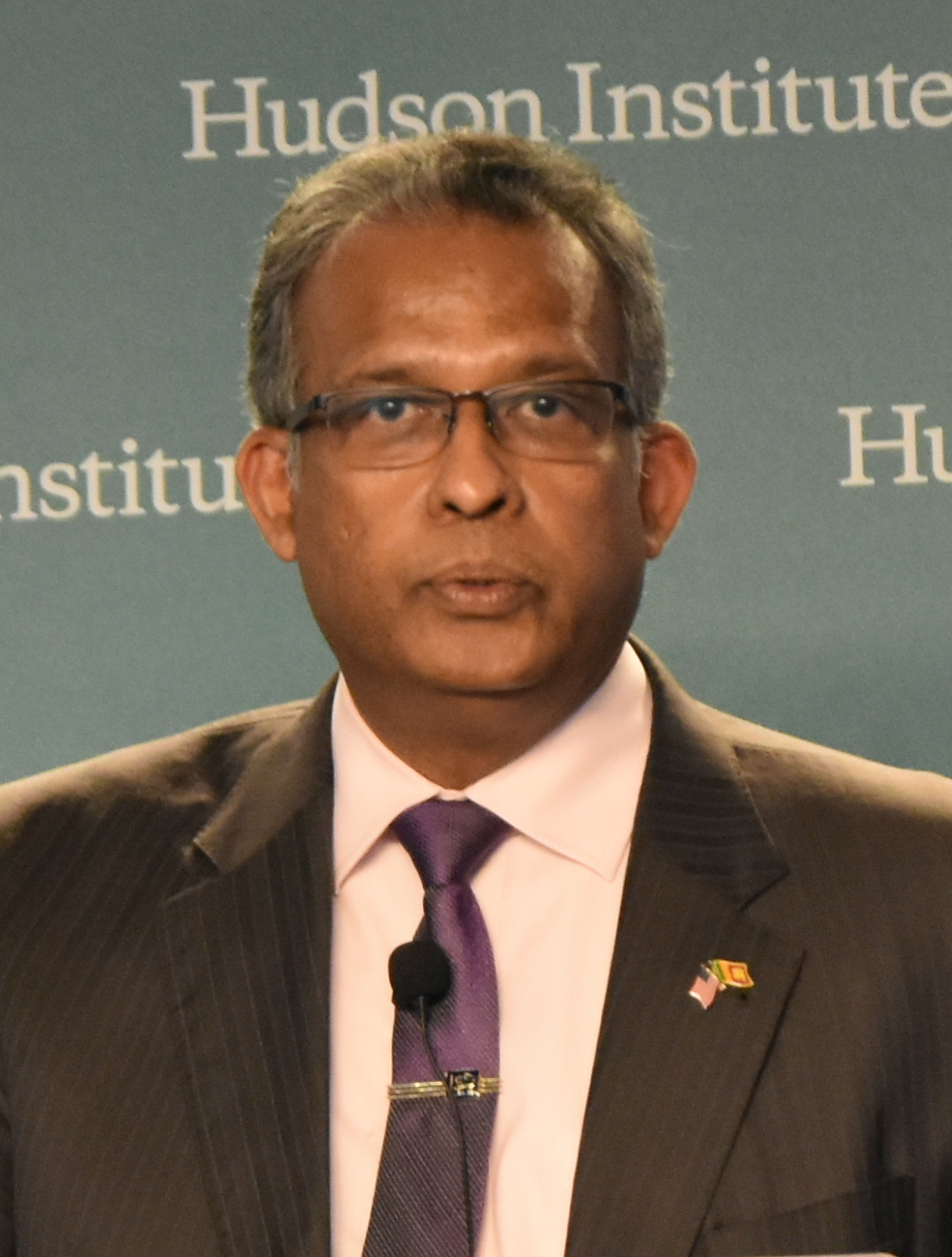
- Born: 21 March 1954 (age 72); Galle, Sri Lanka
- Education: Richmond College Galle
- Occupation: Diplomat

Prasad Kariyawasam is a Sri Lankan diplomat and the former Secretary to the Ministry of Foreign Affairs, the top diplomat in Sri Lanka. He was the International Affairs Adviser to Karu Jayasooriya, Speaker of the Parliament of Sri Lanka. He previously served as Sri Lankan Ambassador to the United States with concurrent accreditation as High Commissioner for Sri Lanka to Trinidad & Tobago and Ambassador (designate) to Mexico. He was also the Permanent Observer of Sri Lanka to the Washington-based Organization of American States (OAS). He has also served as Sri Lankan Ambassador to India, Afghanistan and Bhutan.

== Early life ==
Kariyawasam was born on 21 March 1954 in Galle, southern Sri Lanka. He was educated at Richmond College Galle and he captained the college Cricket team in 1972. Also he skippered the Southern Province Schools cricket team and played for All Ceylon Schools Combined team. During his school cricket career, Prasad Kariyawasam scored five centuries. Kariyawasam was also a Queen's Boy Scout and was the Scout Troop leader at Richmond in 1968. He had represented Sri Lanka at the 9th Australian Scout Jamboree held in Sydney in 1969. He entered the University of Peradeniya and obtained a Bachelor of Science (Hons) Special Degree in Mathematics in 1978.

In University he was elected President of the Science Students' Union in 1977. Also, he was also elected President of the University Sport Council in 1978 and Treasurer of the All University Students' Council in 1977.

At university he played cricket and captained the University cricket team in 1977–78, in Division I, Sara trophy. He was awarded the Most Outstanding University Sportsmen of the Year, in 1978.

While playing for the university, in 1978, Kariyawasam was selected to represent the Sri Lanka Board President's XI against the visiting Derrick Robins XI. In that match, Kariyawasam had figures of 3 for 22, including the prize wicket of David Gower, who went on to captain England.

Kariyawasam is married and has two children.

== Diplomatic career ==
Kariyawasam joined the Sri Lanka Foreign Service in 1981 and has served as a diplomat in Geneva twice (1983–1987, 2001–2004), Riyadh (1989–1992), Washington (1995–1998), New Delhi twice (1998–2001, 2009) and New York (2005–2008). In his previous assignment in New Delhi, he served as the Deputy High Commissioner. In Geneva, he served as Ambassador and Permanent Representative of Sri Lanka to the United Nations, while holding the positions of the Consul General of Sri Lanka to Switzerland, Personal Representative of the Head of State of Sri Lanka to the G-15 and concurrently accredited Ambassador of Sri Lanka to the Holy See. In New York, he served as Ambassador and Permanent Representative of Sri Lanka to the United Nations and was concurrently accredited as the High Commissioner of Sri Lanka to Jamaica and The Bahamas, as well as Ambassador of Sri Lanka to Chile and Colombia.

He also held the position of Director General of the Economic Affairs Division and served as an Additional Secretary in the Ministry of Foreign Affairs.

== United Nations ==
=== Rights of Migrant Workers ===
Ambassador Kariyasawam was the President of the Council of the International Organization for Migration (IOM) in the years 2001-2002. He was the first Chairperson of the Committee on Migrant Workers (CMW) and held this post until 2008, during the initial formative stages of the Committee, leading the evolution and consolidation of its working methods and procedures, as well as the advocacy of the Convention. Ambassador Kariyasawam was the Chair of the Meetings of the Chairpersons of Human Rights Treaty Bodies and Inter-Committee Meetings for the year 2004.

== Appointments ==
- Alternate Representative of Sri Lanka at the 53rd, 54th and 55th Sessions of the UN Commission for Human Rights (CHR) held in Geneva.
- At the World Conference against Racism held in Durban in 2001, he was elected Vice-Chair of the Main Committee.
- He was the elected chairperson of United Nations Convention on the Protection of the Rights of All Migrant Workers and Members of Their Families, 2003–2008.
- Elected Chair of the 2004 Sessions of the Chairpersons of Human Rights Treaty Bodies and Inter Committee Meetings.
- Chairperson of the United Nations Special Committee Investigating Israel Practices Affecting the Human Rights of the Palestine People and other Arabs in the Occupied Territories 2005–2008.
- Member of the United Nations Panel of Experts on Small Arms, which produced a report on the subject to the UN General Assembly, in 1997.
- Represented the UN Group of Government Experts on the Relationship between Disarmament and Development, in 2004.
- Presided over the UN Conference to Review the Progress in the Implementation of the Programme of Action to Prevent, Combat and Eradicate Illicit Trade in Small and Light Weapons in all its aspects. New York July 2006.
- Vice-Chairperson of the Economic and Social Council of the United Nations in 2006.
- Vice-President of the UN General Assembly for the years 2007–2008.
- President of the Council of the International Organization for Migration in 2001–2002 at its 50th anniversary session.
- Represented Sri Lanka at the annual session of the World Economic Forum held in Davos in 2002.
- Represented the Advisory Board of the International Commission on Nuclear Non-Proliferation and Disarmament.
- Leader of Sri Lankan delegation in Ministerial Conference of the Regional Integrated Multi-Hazard Early Warning System for Africa and Asia (RIMES).

== See also ==
- List of heads of missions from Sri Lanka
