= Martin de Silva =

Ceylonese cricketer

Richard Martin M. de Silva (3 March 1903, in Galle – 12 August 1978) was a Ceylonese cricketer. He was an all rounder, who represented Ceylon in the first ever first-class cricket match played in the country. R. M. M. de Silva also played for the Ceylonese against the visiting Marylebone Cricket Club in 1927 and was one of the best all-rounders of the Sinhalese Sports Club. He was educated at Richmond College in Galle, where he captained the college cricket team in 1921 and 1922. Later he served as a cricket coach for the school cricketers in Galle district.
