= Richmond College, Galle =

Richmond College

Location
- 6°3′10″N 80°12′17″E

Information
- Type: National school
- Motto: Nisi Dominus Frustra
- Religious affiliation: Methodist
- Established: 1 May 1876; 150 years ago
- Founder: George Bough, Methodist Church of Great Britain
- Principal: Prabhath Vithanage
- Grades: Primary to GCE A/L
- Gender: Boys
- Age: 6 to 19
- Enrollment: 4800
- Colours: Maroon, Electric blue and Navy blue
- Song: "Richmond Anthem"
- Website: Official school website

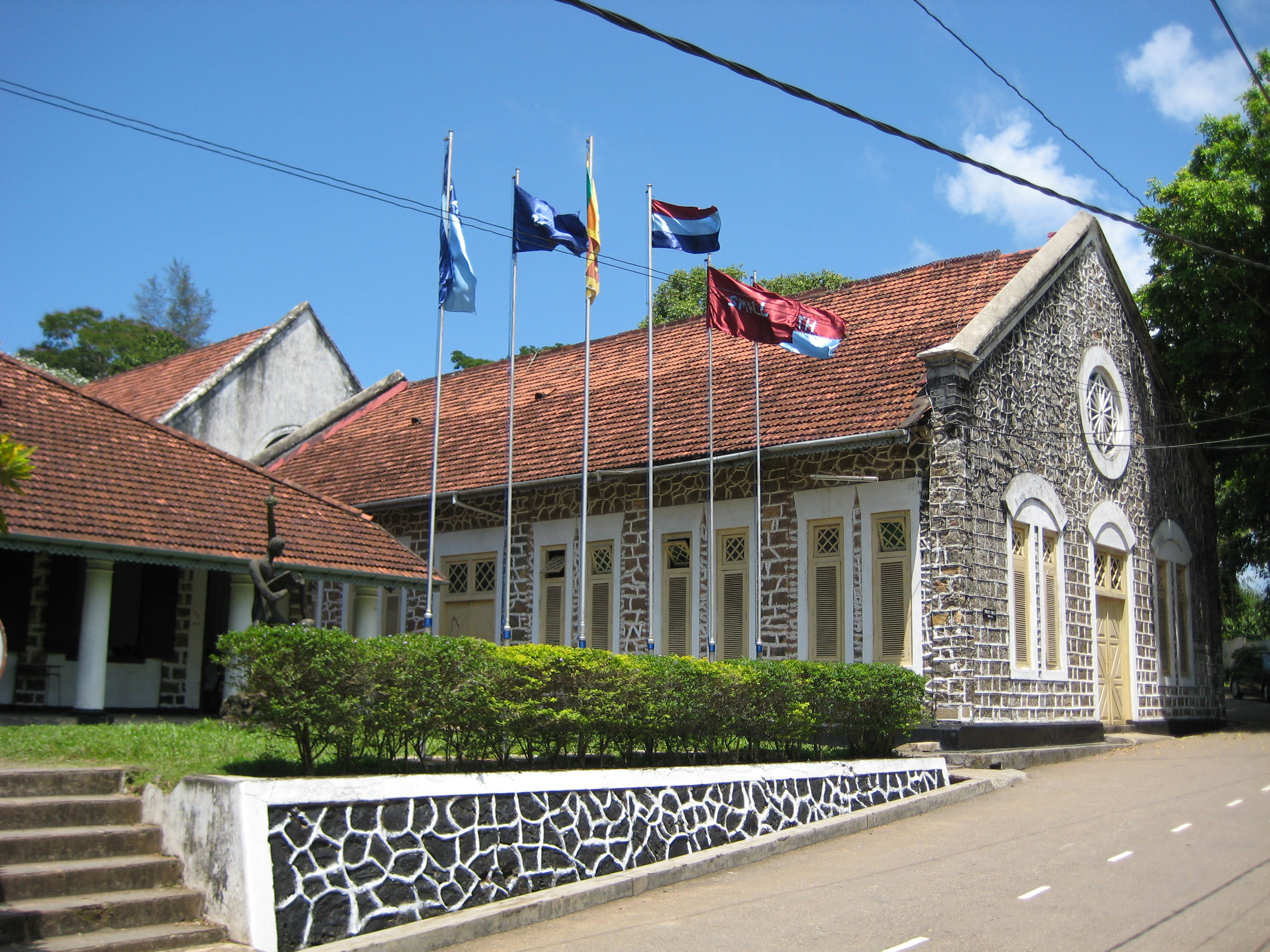
Richmond College Main Hall

Richmond College (රිච්මන්ඩ් විද්‍යාලය) is a primary and secondary school in Galle, Sri Lanka which was established as the Galle High School in 1876. The founder of the school was the Wesleyan Missionary George Bough. The first principal of the school was Rev Samuel Langdon. In 1882, the school was renamed Richmond College.

== History ==
The first College magazine was published in 1887. It was only the second occasion that a school in Ceylon had produced a magazine. The same year, the English Literary Union was formed and cricket was started in the school. In 1894, under the principal-ship of Horatius Hartley, the Richmond College Old Boys' Association was formed. Another important occurrence during that year was the establishment of the College Cadet Corps. James Horne Darrell assumed duties as principal in 1896. The school experienced both physical expansion as well as qualitative growth. During his period, Richmond rose to be recognised as one of the best schools in the island. At the local University of Cambridge Examinations of 1905, Richmond earned a top position among assisted schools and second place among all schools in Ceylon. The same year, the Richmond-Mahinda Cricket Encounter was played for the first time, with the two principals, Darrell and Frank Woodward of Mahinda College, officiating as umpires. Darrell sacrificed his life for the college nursing the pupils who were afflicted with 'typhoid' when there was an outbreak in the country and was buried at the Dadalla Cemetery, Galle. W. J. T. Small became principal following the death of Darrell. Darrell and Small are the only two principals of Richmond who have been buried side by side and both principals met with their deaths under tragic circumstances; the former due to typhoid fever and the latter due to an accident.

Commerce was introduced as a subject in 1912. This was also the year in which football was started at Richmond. In 1915, the 2nd Galle (Richmond) Scouts Group was established. Scouting at Richmond College enjoyed remarkable success from the beginning. The first two King's Scouts in the island were produced by Richmond. In 1916, Ceylon's first cub pack was started at Richmond College. A notable event during the Small's period was the formation of the National Association at Richmond in 1915. It was in effect a forum within the school for the emerging nationalist movement. In 1922, Alec Sneath took over the reins of Richmond College. He was responsible for many measures which brought refinement and qualitative development to the school. In 1926, a well-equipped library was established in a new building. The Science Society was started the same year. In 1931, the Sinhala Literary Union came into being.

In 1940, the last of the missionary principals left, leaving the school in the hands of local graduates. E. R. de Silva, an old boy (alumni) of the school, had the distinction of becoming the first Ceylonese principal of Richmond College. This was a period which saw major changes in the educational structure of Ceylon. The Free Education Scheme which was devised by C. W. W. Kannangara, an old boy of Richmond College, was being implemented, and the school had to be geared to suit the changes. The history of Richmond are from original Mission Records held in the Methodist Mission Library, in Colombo and in England.

In 1962, Richmond College, which was owned by the Methodist Mission, was vested in the government with no compensation to the Mission. D. G. Welikala, the first head of Richmond College under state management, was also its first Buddhist principal. With the takeover, the Methodist Vernacular School on Richmond Hill was amalgamated with Richmond. This school was referred to as the "Kaha Iskole (කහ ඉස්කෝලේ)" by some and "Pin Iskole (පිං ඉස්කෝලෙ)" meaning Charity school by others has been in existence from the time the Missionaries established a learning seat on Richmond Hill in 1858. During this period, considerable expansion and change had to take place to cater to the new situation. Richmond College faced the challenge of transition so successfully that the then Minister of Education commended Richmond on several occasions, describing it as a model institution among nationalised schools.

Richmond College was one of the first schools in the island to start teaching agriculture as a subject. In 1969, it became the first school in the country to start an agricultural stream for the Advanced Level. In 1976, the College celebrated its centenary of upgrading. In terms of the provisions of the White Paper on Education, Richmond College was named a National School in 1986. Richmond College Old Boys' Association was incorporated in 1998 by Act #04 of Parliament of Sri Lanka.

In 2013 the Methodist Church at Richmond Hill was declared was formally recognised by the Government as an Archaeological Protected Monument.

== Principals ==
The following are the heads of the school from 1876, to-date

- Samuel Langdon (1876 – 1879)
- Robert Tebb (1879)
- Samuel Hill (1879 – 1882)
- Samuel R. Wilkins (1882 – 1888)
- Arthur Triggs (1888 – 1893)
- Horatius Hartley (1893 – 1896)
- James Horne Darrell (1896 – 1906)
- Percy T. Cash (1914 – 1915)
- W. J. T. Small (1906 – 1922)
- Alec A. Sneath (1922 – 1939)
- John Dalby (1939 – 1940)
- E. R. de Silva (1940 – 1957), first Ceylonese principal
- A. Shelton Wirasinghe (1957 – 1961)
- Claude Ivor de Silva (1961), acting

=== Richmond College (1962 onwards) ===
- D. G. Welikala (1962–1971), the first principal after nationalisation
- J. Munasinghe (1971–1973)
- S. Kariyawasam (1973–1977)
- N. P. G. Amarakeerthi (1978–1979)
- B. Suriarachchi (1979–1986)
- S. Illayperuma (1986–1994)
- W. N. R. P. Daniyas (1994–2004)
- G. V. S. B. Shanthasiri (2004–2008)
- E. M. S. Ekanayake (2008–2015)
- Sampath Weragoda (2015–2020)
- Thilak Waththuhewa (2020–2021)
- W. P. Niluka Dilruk Weerasinghe (2021–2022)
- P. S. Pushpakumara (2022 – 2025)
- R. S. N. Maddumahewage (2025 – 2026)
- Prabhath Vithanage (2026–present)

== Cricket ==
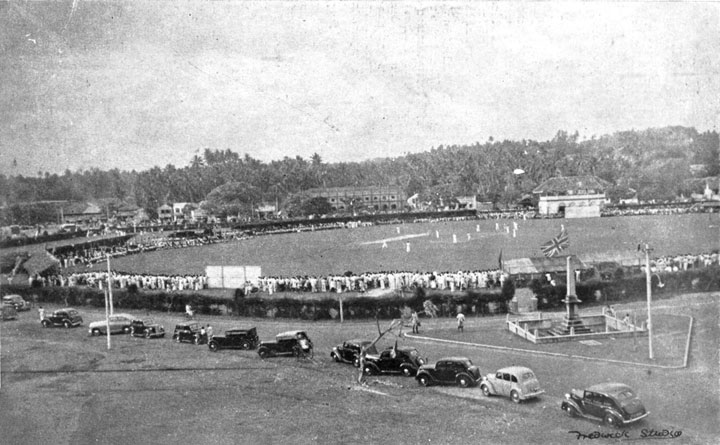
Richmond-Mahinda Big Match

The annual cricket match between Richmond College and Mahinda College is one of the longest cricket match series in Sri Lanka, having been played for over 119 years. The match which is also known as the "Lovers' Quarrel", is played at the Galle International Stadium. The series begun in 1905, under the two principals Rev. James Horne Darrel of Richmond College and Sir. Frank Lee Woodward of Mahinda College.

== See also ==
- List of the oldest schools in Sri Lanka
