= Frederick Gordon Pearce =

English educationist, regarded as the founder of the Indian public school movement

Frederick Gordon Pearce (24 March 1892 – 1962) was an English educationist who served in India and Ceylon. He is regarded as the founder of the Indian public school movement.

== Educational philosophy ==
Pearce was deeply influenced by the Teachings on Education of the philosopher Jiddu Krishnamurti and was a proponent of a scheme of "New Education". He helped found the Indian Boy Scout Movement, later subsumed into the Scout Movement of India on Baden-Powell's request, with Annie Besant.

== Career ==
Pearce worked with several well known public residential schools in India. He served as the Director General of Education for Gwalior and helped convert the Scindia School founded by the Maharaja of Gwalior into a residential school. During 1921 to 1923 he was the principal of Mahinda College, a Buddhist boys school in Galle, Sri Lanka. He also served as Secretary to the Ministry of Education in Ceylon in the late 1940s, a position he resigned to become the principal of Rishi Valley School in India for a decade from 1949. His innovations there included attempts to involve children in farming, tailoring the curriculum for individual students and scrapping the system of annual examinations and the practice of asthachal. Following his resignation from Rishi School, Pearce founded the Blue Mountains School at Ootacamund in 1961. Pearce was also closely associated with the establishment of the Netarhat Vidyalaya in Jharkhand and his contributions to education were gratefully acknowledged by President Rajendra Prasad.

== Books ==
Pearce authored numerous books and pamphlets including Footprints in the Sands of Time, Sonnets of a Schoolmaster and other verse, A round of Rajput Tales, The Coconut Lands of Southern India and The dawn of freedom.
