= Mahinda College =

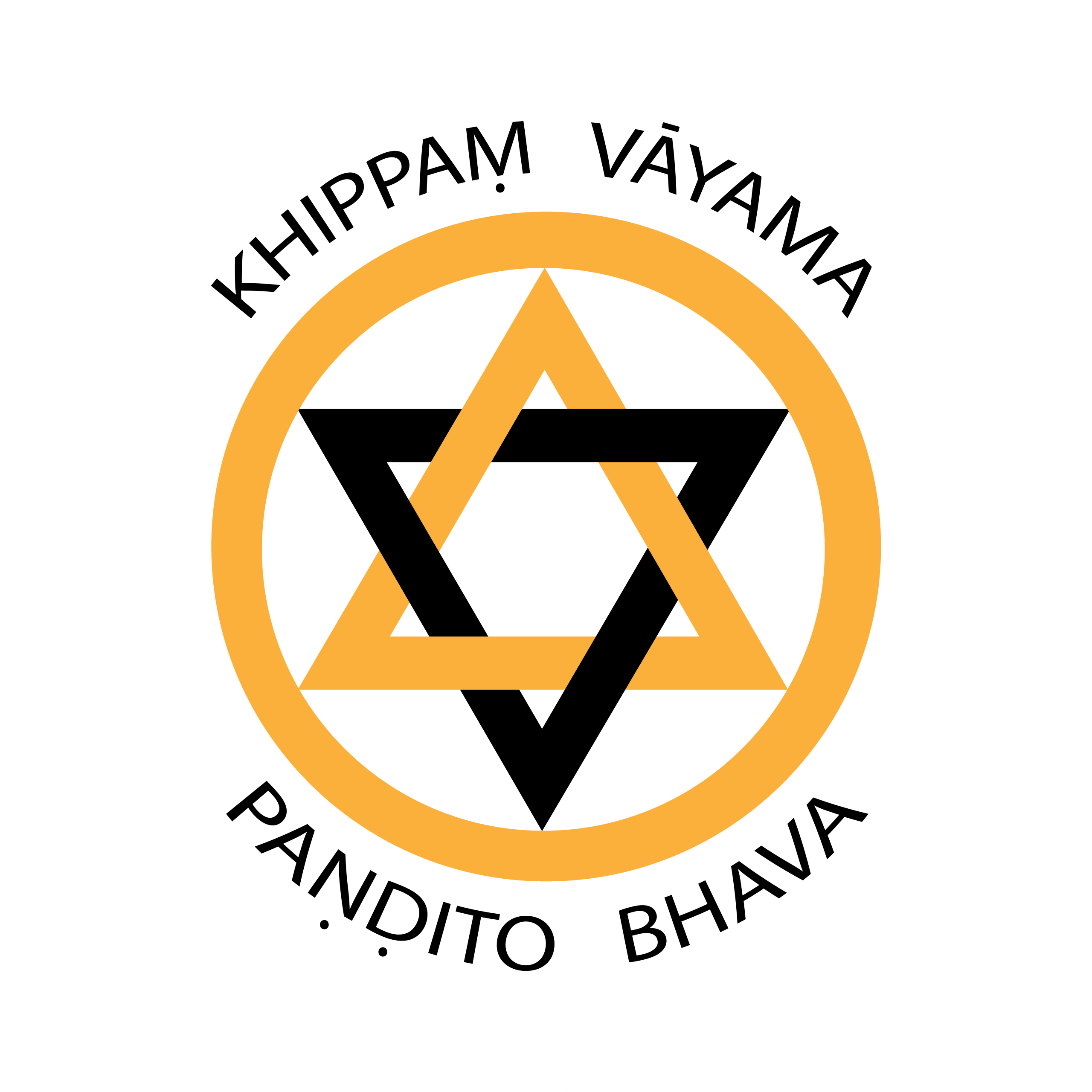
- The Crest of Mahinda College

Location
- Galle; Sri Lanka
- 6°03′00.5″N 80°12′55.2″E

Information
- Type: Public School, National College
- Motto: Khippam Vāyama Pandito Bhava (Strive hard and be wise)
- Founded: 1 March 1892
- Founder: Colonel Henry Steel Olcott
- Principal: Mr.Janaka Peduruhewa
- Staff: 300+
- Grades: 1 to G.C.E. (A/L)
- Gender: Boys
- Age: 6 to 19
- Enrollment: 5000
- Colors: Black and gold
- Publication: Sahasa Magazine
- Affiliation: Buddhist
- Alumni: Old Mahindians
- Website: www.mahindacollege.lk

Mahinda College(මහින්ද විද්‍යාලය) is a Buddhist boys' school in Galle, Sri Lanka. The school was established on 1 March 1892 by the Buddhist Theosophical Society led by Colonel Henry Steel Olcott. As of today it is a national school which provides primary and secondary education across 13 grades to a student population of around 5000.

== History ==
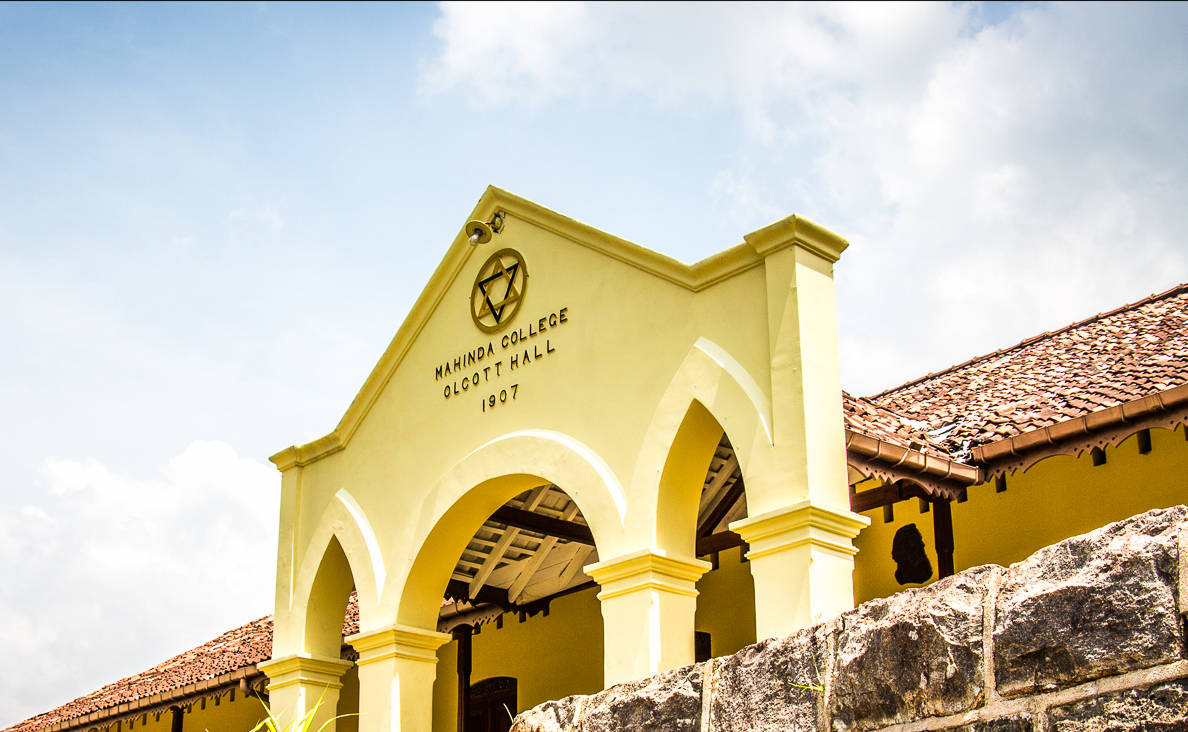
Main Hall of Mahinda College, which was named after Colonel Henry Steel Olcott

Colonel Henry Steel Olcott, a retired United States army officer, came across a report of a religious debate between Buddhist monks and Christian clergy in Ceylon. He began to correspond with the Buddhist monks of Ceylon, eventually leading him to visit Ceylon.

Olcott arrived on 17 May 1880 with Helena Blavatsky in Galle, where they converted to Buddhism at the Wijeyananda temple. They founded the Buddhist Theosophical Society and set about opening up Buddhist schools such as Dharmaraja College in Kandy, Ananda College in Colombo, and Maliyadeva College in Kurunegala. With the help of John Bowles Daly, an Irish clergyman and a theosophist, Mahinda College was opened on 1 March 1892 at Pedlar Street in Galle Fort. The school was named after Arahat Mahinda, the monk who introduced Buddhism to Sri Lanka.

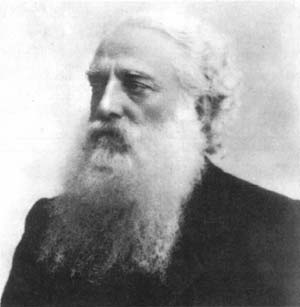
Colonel Henry Steel Olcott, founder of Mahinda College

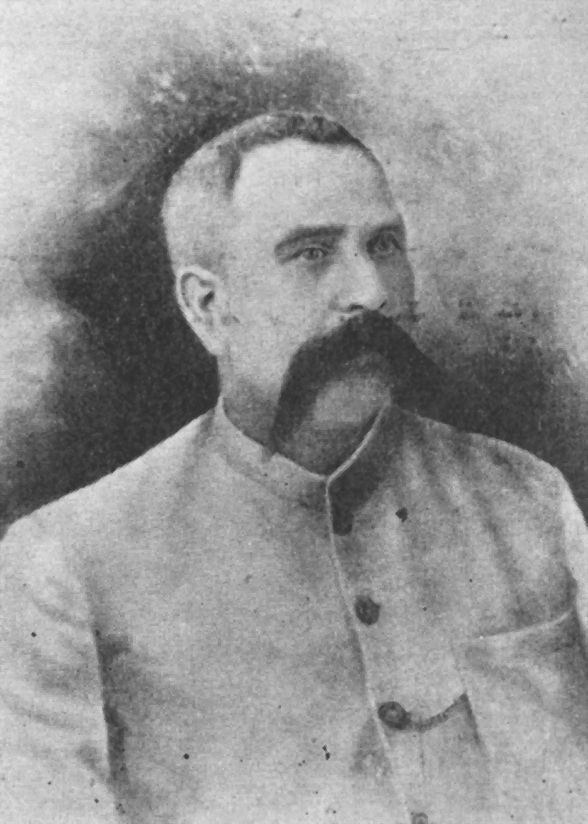
John Bowles Daly, ca. 1892

Daly left after one year, followed by a number of principals serving for short periods. With the arrival of Frank Lee Woodward as principal in 1903, the average attendance of the school rose to 142 from 89. Also in 1903, students took the Cambridge examination, and in July 1904, G. W. Perera won a scholarship to Cambridge. By 1905 there were 246 students attending. Woodward had plans to relocate the college, and purchased land called "Dawatagahawatta" with a view of the Sripada (Adam's peak). On 15 January 1908 the foundation stone of the Olcott hall was laid and the new building’s ceremonial opening took place on 1 August 1912.

With the new location which suited education, the number of students rose to 300. The First Galle Mahinda Scout Group was started in June 1914 with the participation of 30 members appointing F. G. Pearce as the Scout Master and A. Ginige as the assistant master. In 1919, Woodward left for Tasmania to edit and translate Buddhist texts for the Pali Text Society, London. Woodward was succeeded by capable principals such as Kalidas Nag, F.G. Pearce and W. A. Troup who served Mahinda College only for short tenures. During this period student population increased and Mahinda College gradually became a leading seat for the Buddhist education in Southern Sri Lanka.

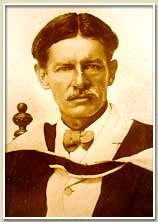
Frank Lee Woodward, the principal of Mahinda College from 1903 to 1919

Dr. Rabindranath Tagore of Shantiniketan visited Mahinda College and delivered a speech on 17 October 1922. In November 1927, Mahatma Gandhi and his wife Kasturbai Gandhi visited Mahinda College and were the chief guests of the annual prize-giving. In 1929, Jawaharlal Nehru, his wife Kamala Devi, daughter Indira and his sister Vijaya Lakshmi Pandit visited Mahinda College where a reception was held in their honour.

In 1942, Mahinda College had its Golden Jubilee celebration to commemorate its eventful history of the first twenty years at Pedlar Street in the Galle Fort, and the next thirty years in the purpose-built school buildings at Elliot Road, Minuwangoda. For the 60th anniversary of Mahinda College in 1952, a new physics laboratory was opened by the Prime Minister Dudley Senanayake on 12 September. Edgar Albert Wijesooriya, an old boy of Mahinda College, was appointed as the principal of the college in 1932 and remained in that position until his retirement in 1962 with the take over of assisted schools by the government. Thereafter Mahinda College became a Sinhala medium Government School. J. H. Gunasekara succeeded E. A. Wijesooriya as the principal in 1962. During his tenure of 12 years in office many buildings came up and the school population was increased significantly.

In 1992 Mahinda College had its centenary celebrations with the participation of Sri Lanka president Ranasinghe Premadasa as the chief guest. Sri Lanka post issued a stamp to mark the centenary celebration of the college. The Scouts Group of the Mahinda College Galle had its centenary celebrations in 2014 under the patronage of president Mahinda Rajapaksa. A seven day scouts jamboree was held with the participation of around 1500 local and foreign scouts to mark the occasion.

== Mahinda College today ==
As of April 2025 the college provides education to 5000students from grades 1 to 13. Students are divided into five groups: primary, junior, secondary, senior secondary and collegiate. The current principal of Mahinda College is Janaka Peduruhewa. The college employs 297 teachers and 30 non academic staff.

== Past principals ==
- 1892–1893: John Bowles Daly
- 1894: Lovegrove
- 1895–1896: O. A. Jayasekara (Acting)
- 1897–1898: M. Balasubramaniya Mudlier
- 1898: Gordon Douglas
- 1899: O. A. Jayasekara (Acting)
- 1900: M. J. Fernando
- 1901: O. A Jayasekara
- 1902: McDougal
- 1903–1919: F. L. Woodward
- 1919–1920: Kalidas Nag
- 1920: S. de S. Jayarathna (Acting)
- 1921–1923: F. G. Pearce
- 1923–1926: W. A. Troup
- 1926–1932: P. R. Gunasekara
- 1932–1962: E. A. Wijesuriya
- 1962–1974: J.H. Gunasekara
- 1974–1975: C. K. Waidyarathnae (Acting)
- 1975–1978: B.K Silva
- 1978–1983: W. A. D. S. Gunathilake
- 1983–1987: C. K. Waidyarathne
- 1987–1991: D. D. Jayasundara
- 1992–1994: M. Wickramasinha
- 1994–1996: D. C. N. de Silva
- 1996–2004: D. K. Athukorala
- 2004–2007: K. A. Susil Premanath
- 2007–2008: L. C. Karunasena (Acting)
- 2008–2011: R. M. Werahera
- 2011–2012: M. A. Jinadasa (Acting)
- 2012–2014: W. M. Wasantha Siriwardhane
- 2014–2021: P. M. G. Gamini Jayawardhane (Acting)
- 2021–2023: Athula Wijewardena
- 2023–2024: R. S. N. Maddhumahewage (Acting)
- 2024-present: Janaka Peduruhewa

== Houses ==
Students are divided into four houses.

- Pandukabhaya -
- Gamunu -
- Thissa -
- Parakrama -

The houses are named after four ancient kings of Sri Lanka. Annual sporting events are held among the houses.

== Lovers' Quarrel ==
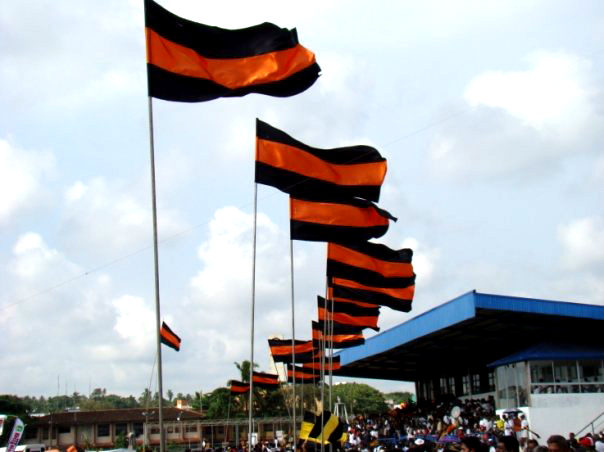
Flags of Mahinda College at the 103rd Lovers' Quarrel

The Lovers' Quarrel or Battle of the Lovers is an annual cricket big match played between the cricket teams of Mahinda College and Richmond College, Galle. The contest was started in 1905 under the principal of Richmond College, Rev. James Horne Darrel, and the principal of Mahinda College, Frank Lee Woodward.

As of 2025, Mahinda College has won the encounter 23 times. The Lover's Quarrel was last won by Mahinda College in 2008, breaking a 30-year-long deadlock of draws which was started in 1978, the year Mahindians recorded their previous win in the big match.

== Notable staff ==
- F. L. Woodward
- F. G. Pearce
- Kalidas Nag
- Arisen Ahubudu
- Ananda Samarakoon
- Edwin Ariyadasa

== See also ==
- Education in Sri Lanka
- Sanghamitta Balika Vidyalaya
- Francis George Stevens
