= F. L. Woodward =

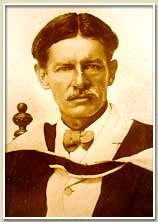
- Born: Frank Lee Woodward; 13 April 1871; Saham Toney, Norfolk, England
- Died: 27 May 1952 (aged 81); Beaconsfield Hospital, West Tamar, Tasmania
- Education: Christ's Hospital, London; Sidney Sussex College, Cambridge
- Occupations: Educator, writer
- Parent(s): William Woodward; Elizabeth Mary Ann

Frank Lee Woodward (13 April 1871 – 27 May 1952) was an English educationist, Pali scholar, author and theosophist. Woodward studied and researched on Theravada Buddhism and wrote numerous work based on them. He is admired among the Pali scholars for compiling the vast concordance of Pali canon by translating eighteen of the forty-two volumes of the Pali texts into English. He also served as the principal of Buddhist school Mahinda College, Galle in Ceylon for 16 years from 1903 to 1919. Woodward lived his latter stage of life in Rowella, Tasmania, mainly spending his time on studies and translation work.

== Early life and education ==
Woodward was born on 13 April 1871 at Saham Toney in Norfolk, England, as the third son of William Woodward, an Anglican vicar, and his wife Elizabeth Mary Ann. Woodward had an archetypal Victorian boyhood and began to study the languages Latin, Greek, French and German by the age of eight. He joined the traditional English public school Christ's Hospital (the Bluecoat School), London in 1879, where he later won the Latin and French prizes on three occasions. Woodward also did well in athletics at his school and won prizes for many athletic events. He did specially well in Putting the weight, where he held the records for several years. Woodward won a scholarship to Sidney Sussex College, Cambridge at the age of eighteen and won the distinction as a classical scholar, sportsman and organist there. He was also the captain of the Rugby football team, vice-captain of Boats and was a full-back of the Soccer team of Sydney Sussex College.

He received BA in 1893 and MA in 1902 and later turned to teaching and taught in several English public schools which secured him a deputy headmaster-ship. Woodward began his teaching career at Rugby Preparatory School, where he served for a short period as an assistant master. Later he taught for three years at the Royal Grammar School, Worcester until 1897 as classics master. Woodward then joined Stamford School, Lincolnshire, where he served for five years as the second master. During his five-year period at Stamford school he spend a great deal of his time for the study of both Western and Eastern philosophy, Pali and Sanskrit, English literature, and religion. Woodward joined the London Theosophical Society in 1902, and became a friend and follower of Col. Henry Steel Olcott, the co-founder and first President of the Theosophical Society. In 1903 Col.Olcott offered him the principal-ship of Mahinda College, Galle, Ceylon which was then administered by the Buddhist Theosophical Society of Galle, Ceylon. Woodward accepted the principalship of Mahinda College which he nursed for the next 16 years of his life.

== Principal of Mahinda College ==
Woodward was the principal of Mahinda College from 1903 to 1919. His work at Mahinda College included taking classes in English, Latin, Pali, Buddhism and Art, in addition to the administrative duties related with the head mastership of the school. With the assistance of Mudaliyar Gunaratne, Muhandiram Thomas Amarasuriya, Muhandiram Wickremasinghe and the charitable Buddhist public of Galle, Woodward relocated Mahinda College from busy Galle fort to its present site, which is more suited for a school. His involvement went much further as he was the designer and architect of its buildings, personally supervised their construction, and often worked alongside the masons. During the tenure of Woodward, the school had grown rapidly and became one of the leading colleges in the Southern Sri Lanka. Although he was a strict disciplinarian, his students greatly idolised him.

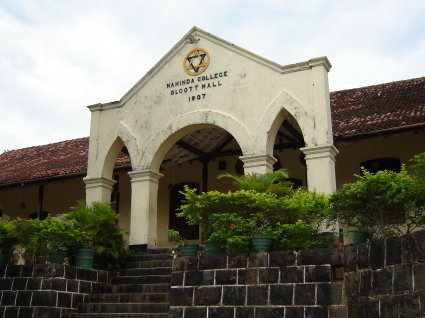
Woodward relocated Mahinda College from Galle fort to its present site which is more suited for a school

While working in Sri Lanka, he edited the Buddhist, the leading Buddhist magazine of the island at the time, and went to Madras each year for the annual convention of the Theosophical Society Adyar. Woodward advised the director of education in Ceylon often during his work and was actively involved with the movement for establishing a University in Ceylon. Sinhalese language was accepted as a subject for the Cambridge local examinations due to his efforts. He decided to leave Mahinda College in 1919 due to the tropical climate, which was having a bad impact on his health. He migrated to Tasmania to live the remaining part of his life with the intention of translating the Pali Canon into English language.

== Retirement in Tasmania ==
Woodward settled in Tasmania, and bought a small apple orchard and a cottage from a fellow Theosophist, situated on the Tamar River 40 km from Launceston, from where Ben Lomond, one of the highest peaks in Tasmania, can be seen. In this peaceful setting he resumed his studies on Buddhism and translations for the Pali Text Society, established by Thomas Rhys Davids in 1881. He lived alone, surrounded by Buddhist scriptures on thousands of ola leaves and practised yoga and meditation. Although he preferred isolation, he developed friendships with his close neighbours and was liked by the local children, who were given sweets by Woodward on his visits to the store. A semi vegetarian and animal lover, he surprised his neighbours with his fondness for the snakes of the area.

In his final years, his orchard became neglected and he was reduced to near poverty. Woodward only left his home town two or three times a year, usually to take part in some activity of the local branch of the Theosophical Society. His work Some Sayings of the Buddha, has contributed to a wider understanding of Buddhism in the western world. An erudite Pali scholar and translator, he translated eighteen of the forty-two volumes of the Pali texts into English and compiled the vast concordance of the Pali canon. In 1936, after the publication of 15 volumes of a complete translation of the Digha, Majjhima, Samyutta and Anguttara Nikaya, Caroline Rhys Davids admired Woodward greatly for his untiring work for which he never expected any reward. Woodward died on 27 May 1952 at Beaconsfield Hospital, West Tamar, at the age of 81. He was buried in Carr Villa cemetery, Launceston.

== Literary works ==
The following are some of the literary works of Woodward.

- Some Sayings of the Buddha According to the Pali Canon
- The Minor Anthologies of the Pali Canon
- The Buddha's Path of Virtue: A Translation of the Dhammapada
- The Book of the Kindred Sayings (Saṃyutta Nikāya)
- The Book of the Gradual Sayings (Aṅguttara Nikāya)
- Pictures of Buddhist Ceylon and Other Papers
- Francis Bacon and the Cipher Story
- Buddhist Stories, Translated from the Pāli
- The Buddhist Doctrine of Reversible Merit
- Peace

== See also ==
- Pali Text Society
- Mahinda College
- London Lodge
- Henry Steel Olcott
- Frederick Gordon Pearce
