= List of ambassadors of Sri Lanka to the United States =

Ambassador of Sri Lanka to the United States
- Emblem of Sri Lanka
- Incumbent; Mahinda B. Samarasinghe since 1 December 2021
- Ministry of Foreign Affairs
- Reports to: Minister of Foreign Affairs
- Seat: Embassy of Sri Lanka, 3025 Whitehaven St NW, Washington, DC, United States
- Nominator: The president of Sri Lanka
- Term length: No fixed term
- Inaugural holder: Sir Claude Corea
- Formation: 29 October 1948; 77 years ago
- Website: slembassyusa.org

The Sri Lankan ambassador to the United States is the Sri Lankan envoy to United States. The Sri Lankan ambassador to the United States is concurrently accredited as ambassador to Mexico and Trinidad and Tobago. The Sri Lankan embassy opened on 29 October 1948 and also maintains a consul-general in Los Angeles.

== Ambassadors ==
Ambassadors	Start of term	End of term	Head of government
Sir Claude Corea	29 October 1948	1 March 1954	D. S. Senanayake; Dudley Senanayake; John Kotelawala
Sir Senerat Gunewardene	2 March 1954	14 August 1961	John Kotelawala; S. W. R. D. Bandaranaike; Wijeyananda Dahanayake; Dudley Senanayake; Sirimavo Bandaranaike
William Gopallawa	15 August 1961	12 March 1963	Sirimavo Bandaranaike
Merenna Francis de Silva Jayaratne	13 March 1963	27 September 1965	Sirimavo Bandaranaike; Dudley Senanayake
Oliver Weerasinghe	28 September 1965	10 September 1970	Dudley Senanayake; Sirimavo Bandaranaike
Neville Kanakaratne	11 September 1970	19 April 1978	Sirimavo Bandaranaike
W. S. Karunaratne	20 April 1978	2 May 1981	J. R. Jayewardene
P. M. D. Fernando	3 May 1981	11 August 1981	J. R. Jayewardene
Ernest Corea	12 August 1981	16 September 1986	J. R. Jayewardene
Susantha De Alwis	17 September 1986	22 September 1992	J. R. Jayewardene
Ananda Guruge	23 September 1992	30 January 1995	Ranasinghe Premadasa
Jayantha Dhanapala	31 January 1995	8 October 1997	Chandrika Kumaratunga
Warnasena Rasaputra	9 October 1997	16 January 2003	Chandrika Kumaratunga
Devinda Subasinghe	17 January 2003	11 April 2005	Chandrika Kumaratunga
Bernard Goonetilleke	12 April 2005	20 August 2008	Chandrika Kumaratunga; Mahinda Rajapaksa
Jaliya Wickramasuriya	21 August 2008	13 July 2014	Mahinda Rajapaksa
Prasad Kariyawasam	14 July 2014	8 July 2019	Mahinda Rajapaksa; Maithripala Sirisena
Rodney Perera	8 July 2019	4 December 2020	Maithripala Sirisena; Gotabaya Rajapaksa
Ravinatha P. Aryasinha	4 December 2020	14 September 2021	Gotabaya Rajapaksa
Mahinda Samarasinghe	1 December 2021	July 2026	Gotabaya Rajapaksa; Ranil Wickremesinghe; Anura Kumara Dissanayake

== See also ==
- List of heads of missions from Sri Lanka
