= Light in painting =

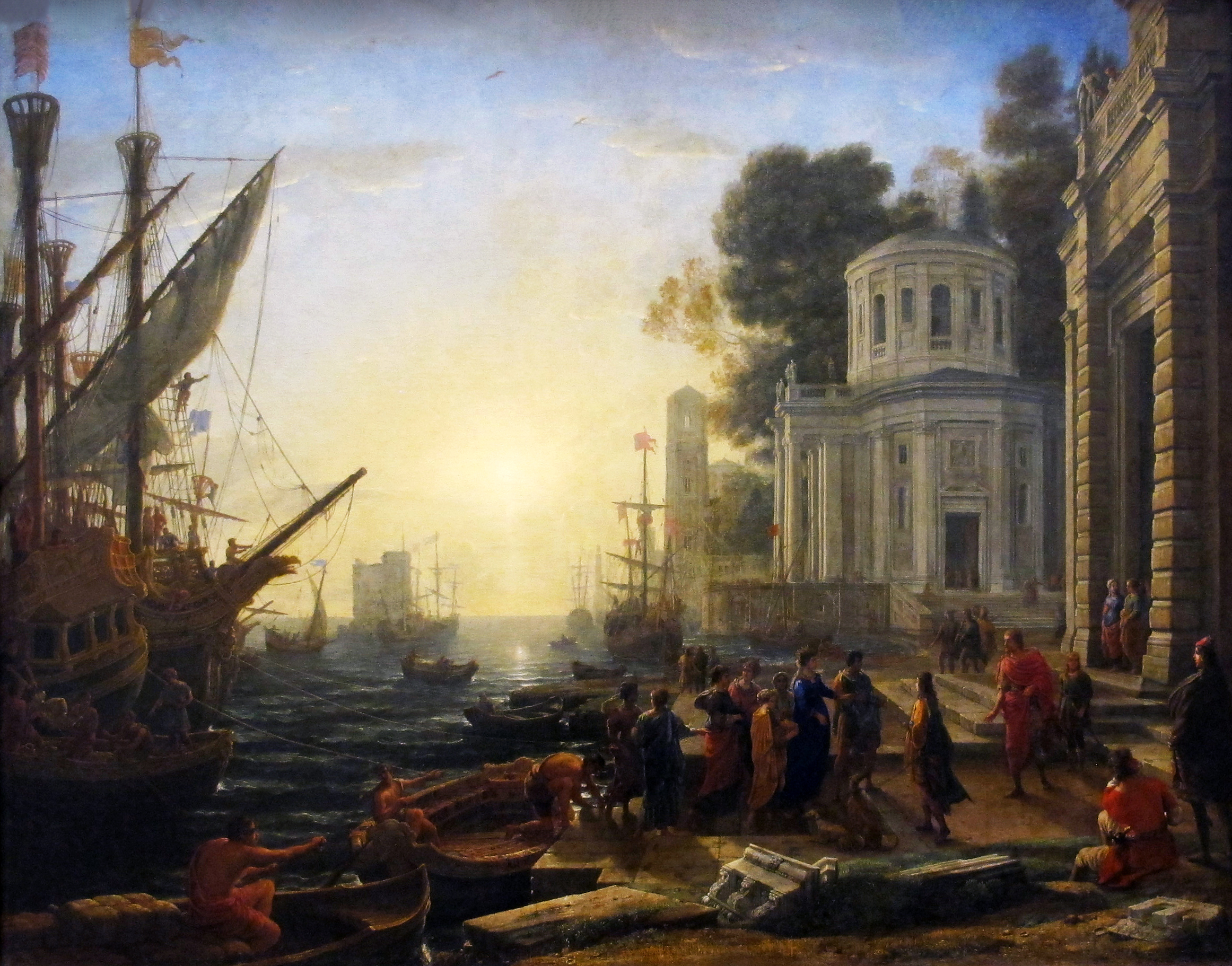
Port with the disembarkation of Cleopatra in Tarsus (1642), by Claude Lorrain, Musée du Louvre, Paris

Light in painting serves both technical and aesthetic purposes. Technically, it is essential to visual representation, as it conditions the perception of color, texture, and volume. Aesthetically, its interplay with shadow and its effects on color and illumination shape the composition and the image the artist intends to convey. Light may also acquire symbolic meaning, especially in religious contexts, where it is frequently associated with divinity.

Because light produces visual impressions in the human eye, it is indispensable for perceiving art. It is likewise inherent to painting, since the interaction of light and shadow underlies drawing, and its relationship with color is fundamental to modeling and relief.

The depiction of light has evolved throughout the history of painting, giving rise to techniques such as shading, chiaroscuro, sfumato, or tenebrism. Light has been especially influential in periods and styles including the Renaissance, Baroque, Impressionism, or Fauvism. The heightened attention to light in painting is known as "luminism", a termterm applied to styles such as Baroque tenebrism and Impressionism, as well as to movements of the late 19th and early 20th centuries, including American, Belgian, and Valencian luminism.

== Optics ==
Light (ultimately from Proto-Indo-European *lewktom, with the meaning "brightness") is an electromagnetic radiation with a wavelength between 380 nm and 750 nm, the part of the visible spectrum that is perceived by the human eye, located between infrared and ultraviolet radiation. It consists of massless elementary particles called photons, which move at a speed of 299 792 458 m/s in a vacuum, while in matter it depends on its refractive index $(n = \frac{c}{v})$. The branch of physics that studies the behavior and characteristics of light is optics.

Light is the physical agent that makes objects visible to the human eye. Its origin can be in celestial bodies such as the Sun, the Moon, or the stars, natural phenomena such as lightning, or in materials in combustion, ignition, or incandescence. Throughout history, human beings have devised different procedures to obtain light in spaces lacking it, such as torches, candles, candlesticks, lamps or, more recently, electric lighting. Light enables vision and is itself perceptible as a visual phenomenon. It makes color visible: light rays reach the retina, which transmits signals to the brain via the optic nerve. Perception of light is partly psychological, so individuals may perceive the same object or luminosity differently.

Primary, secondary and tertiary colors on the traditional color wheel (RYB)

Objects have varying luminance (or reflectance), absorbing or reflecting light to different degrees. This affects perceived color, from white (maximum reflection) to black (maximum absorption), both considered gradations of brightness rather than chromatic colors. When white light strikes a colored surface, only photons of that color are reflected; if these illuminate another similarly colored surface, they reinforce its saturation—an effect called radiance.

Sunlight contains a continuous spectrum of colors that can be separated into the rainbow hues. Atmospheric scattering affects their perception: shorter wavelengths (blue) scatter more easily, giving the sky its color, while denser atmospheric conditions at sunset favor the perception of longer wavelengths (red).

Color corresponds to specific wavelengths of light. The chromatic circle represents primary colors (lemon yellow, magenta red, cyan blue), their secondary mixtures (orange red, bluish violet, green), and tertiary combinations. Complementary colors are opposite on the circle, while adjacent colors lie close together. Mixing adjacent colors produces shading; mixing complementary colors creates neutralization. Color is defined by hue (position on the circle), saturation (purity), and value (luminosity), which increases with white and decreases with black or complementary colors.

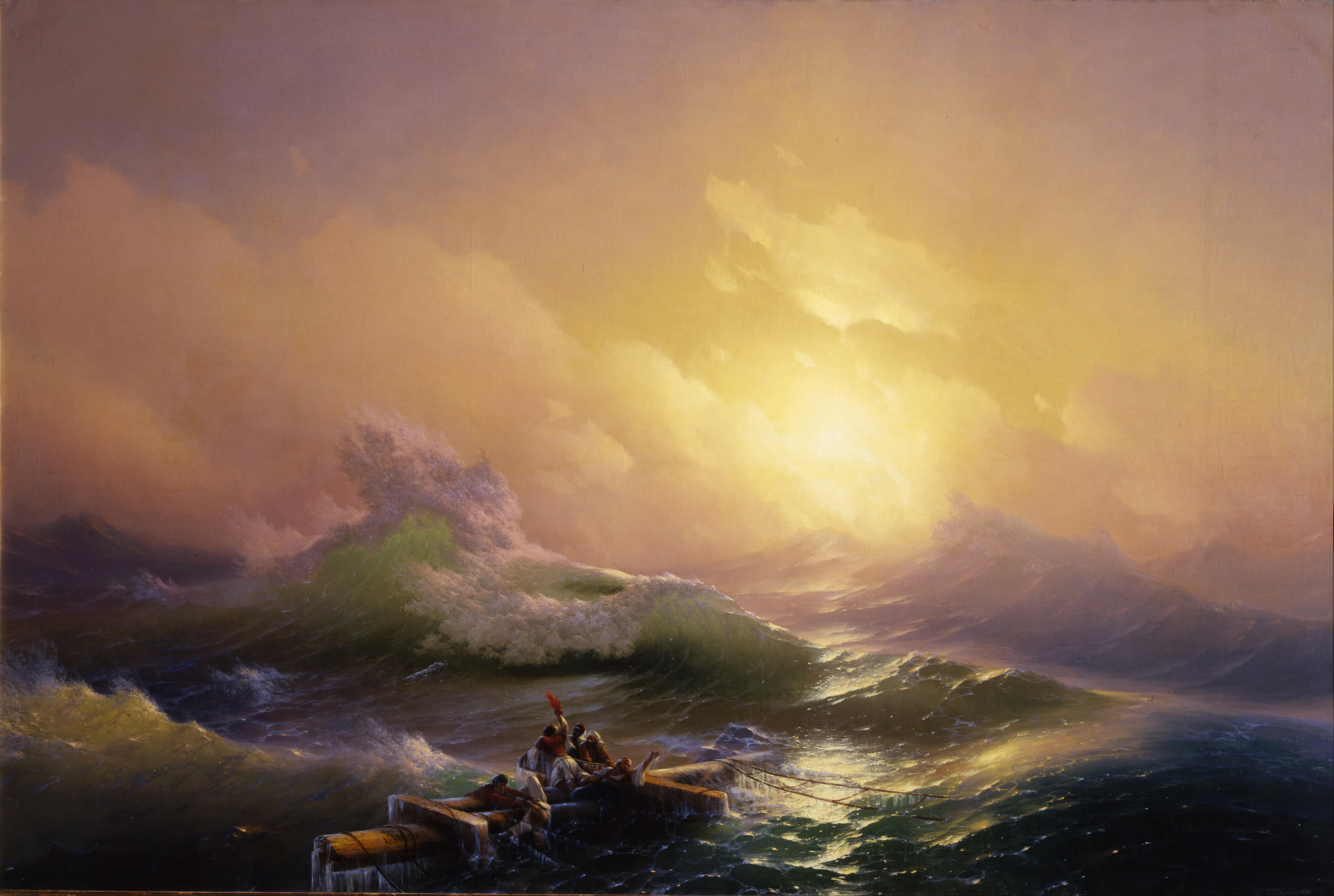
Ninth Wave (1850), by Ivan Aivazovsky, State Russian Museum, Saint Petersburg

The Sun is the principal source of natural light, whose appearance varies throughout the day. Mid-morning and mid-afternoon light is generally clear and bluish; midday light is white and intense, with strong contrasts; dusk and sunset light is softer and warmer, ranging from yellow to red. Cloudy conditions produce diffuse light with soft shadows, while night light—lunar or refracted sunlight—is dim and scattered. Indoors, natural light is similarly diffuse and lower in intensity; its contrast and color depend on the number of openings, time of day, and reflective surfaces. North light, entering from north-facing windows, is valued for its constant, soft, and even illumination.

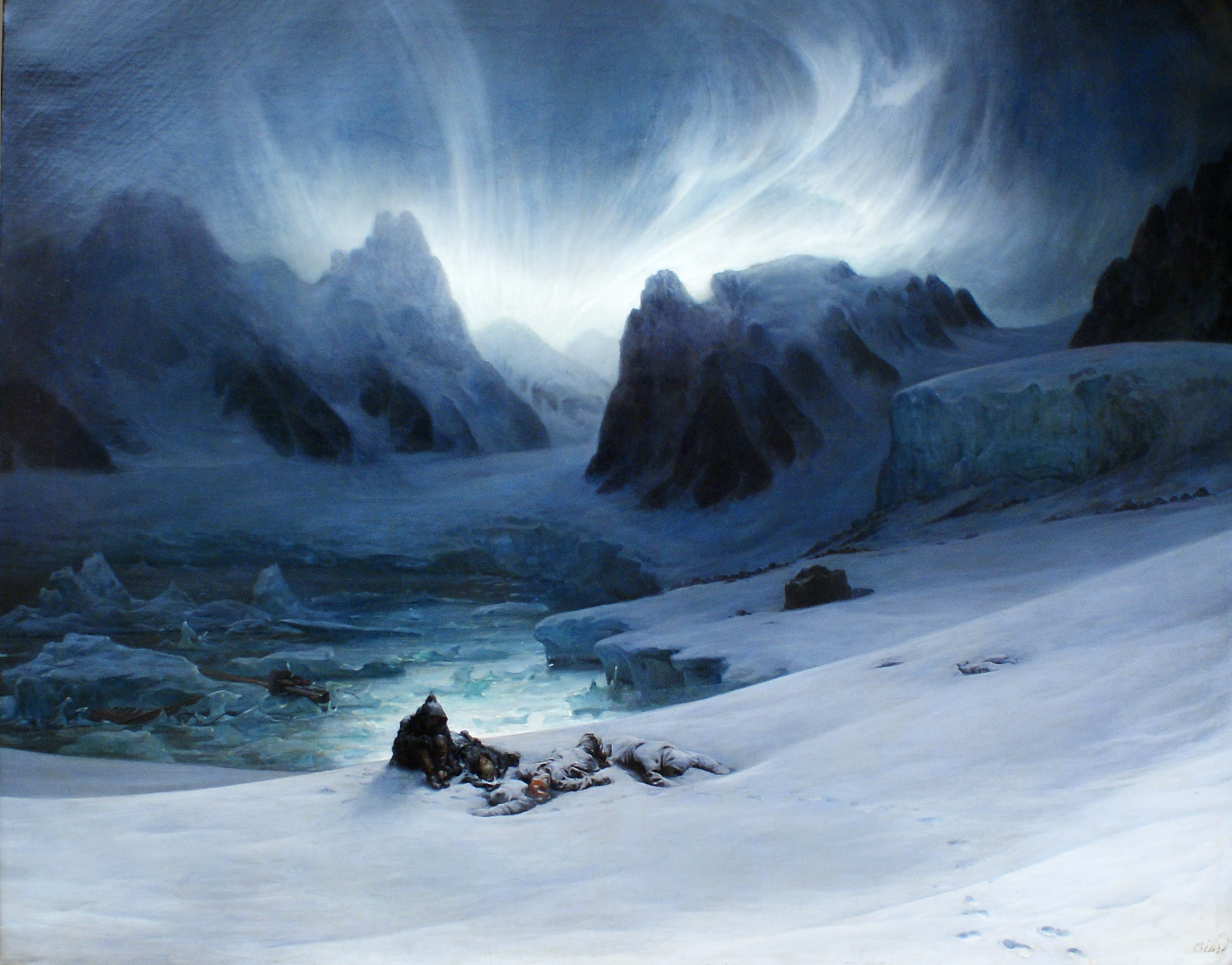
Madeleine Bay (1841), by François-Auguste Biard, Musée du Louvre, Paris

Artificial light includes several main types: fire and candles, which produce red or orange light; electric light—usually tungsten or wolfram—typically yellow or orange and either direct or diffused; fluorescent light, which is greenish; and photographic flash, which is white. Many environments contain mixed lighting, combining natural and artificial sources.

Visible reality consists of a balance between light and shadow, with shadows forming when an opaque object blocks light. The gradation between light and shadow depends on the illumination and on objects that may generate additional shadows. Under certain conditions, one element may dominate, as with the brightness of snow or fog or the darkness of night. Lighting dominated by light tones is termed high key, while lighting dominated by dark tones is low key

Shadows may be self shadows (shaded areas on the object itself) or cast shadows (shadows projected onto surrounding surfaces). Self shadows reveal volume and texture; cast shadows define spatial relationships. Shadow structure includes the penumbra, the darkest area, and the umbra, the lightest. Their appearance depends on the size and distance of the light source: small or distant sources produce sharper shadows with dominant penumbra, while large or close sources create more diffuse edges with stronger umbra. Shadows may also be modified by a secondary or “fill” light. Their color, generally between blue and black, varies with contrast, transparency, and translucency. Natural light produces parallel beams and shadows that respond closely to terrain and obstacles; artificial light produces divergent beams with softer boundaries and may create overlapping shadows when multiple sources are present.

Light reflection produces four related phenomena: glints, which are direct reflections of the light source; glares, created by illuminated reflective surfaces; color reflections, generated by adjacent colored objects; and image reflections, produced by polished surfaces such as mirrors or water. Light also generates phenomena of transparency and translucency in non-opaque bodies, producing filtered light. This effect can also be created through materials such as curtains, blinds, fabrics, or through trees and other partially permeable surfaces.

== Pictorial representation of light ==
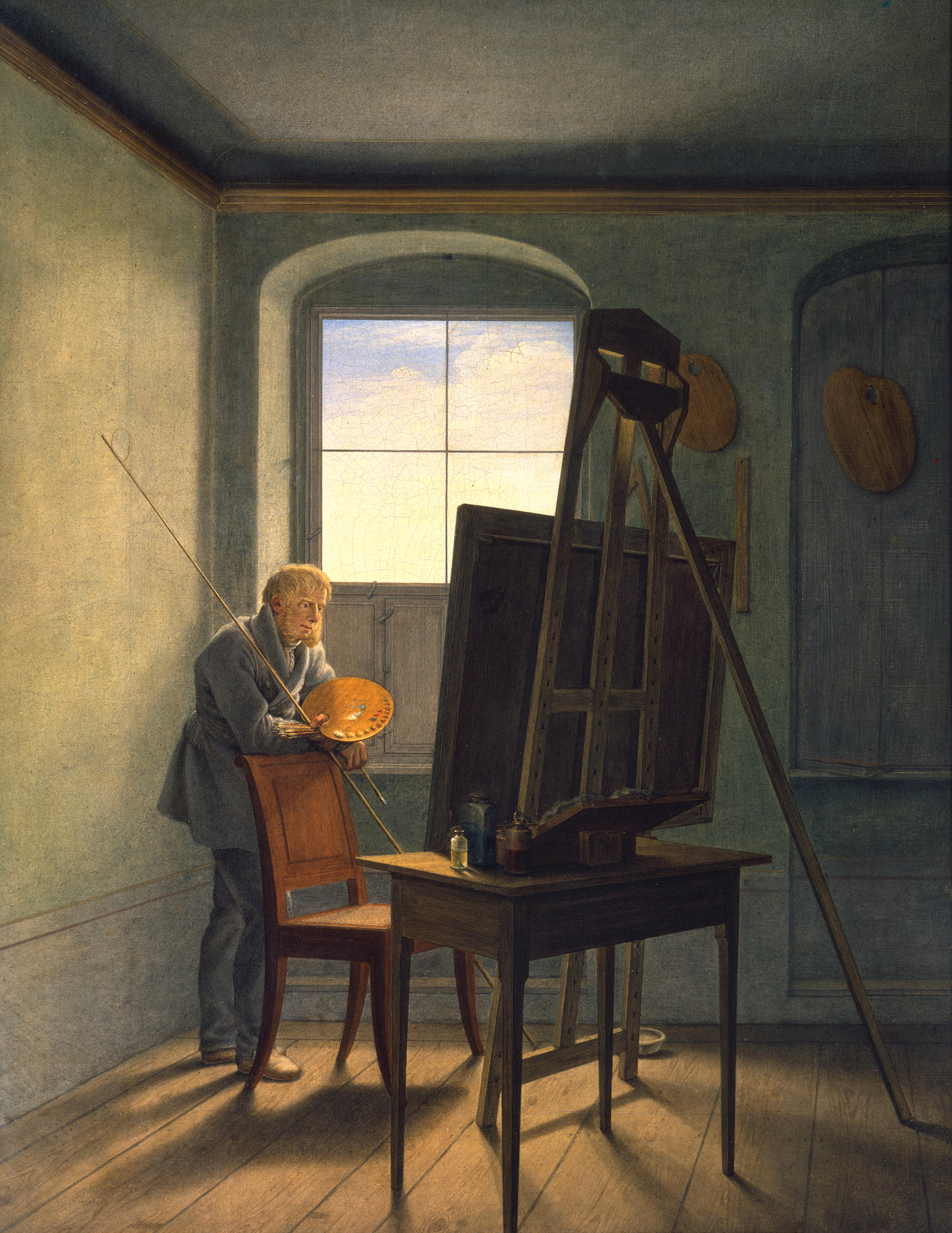
Caspar David Friedrich in his studio (1819), by Georg Friedrich Kersting, Alte Nationalgalerie, Berlin

In artistic terminology, light refers to the point or center of luminous diffusion within a painting, or the illuminated areas in relation to the shadows. It also designates the type of illumination used—zenithal (vertical), high (oblique), straight (horizontal), or studio light (artificial). Accidental light denotes non-solar illumination, such as moonlight or artificial sources. Light may enter the composition from various directions: lateral light emphasizes texture; frontal light minimizes shadows and volume; zenithal light, falling from above, slightly distorts forms; upward or contrapicado light exaggerates distortion; and backlight obscures the figure’s silhouette.

According to its distribution, light can be homogeneous (evenly spread), dual (figures emerging from a dark background), or insertive (interplay of light and shadow). By origin, light may be intrinsic (uniform, without strong effects), characteristic of Romanesque and Gothic art, or extrinsic (with contrasts and directional sources), frequent in the Renaissance and Baroque. Extrinsic light includes focal light, which may be tangible (from a visible light-emitting object) or intangible (from an unseen source); diffuse light, which softens contours; real light, aiming to represent sunlight with precision; and unreal or symbolic light, typical in sacred imagery. Depending on intention, light may be compositional (organizing the scene) or conceptual (enhancing meaning), as in Caravaggio’s selective illumination.

Light may be ambient—without defined shadows—or projected, which produces shadows and aids modeling. The light source is the object emitting light, while the light focus is the most luminous area of the painting. The interplay of light and shadow is chiaroscuro; when darkness predominates, it becomes tenebrism.

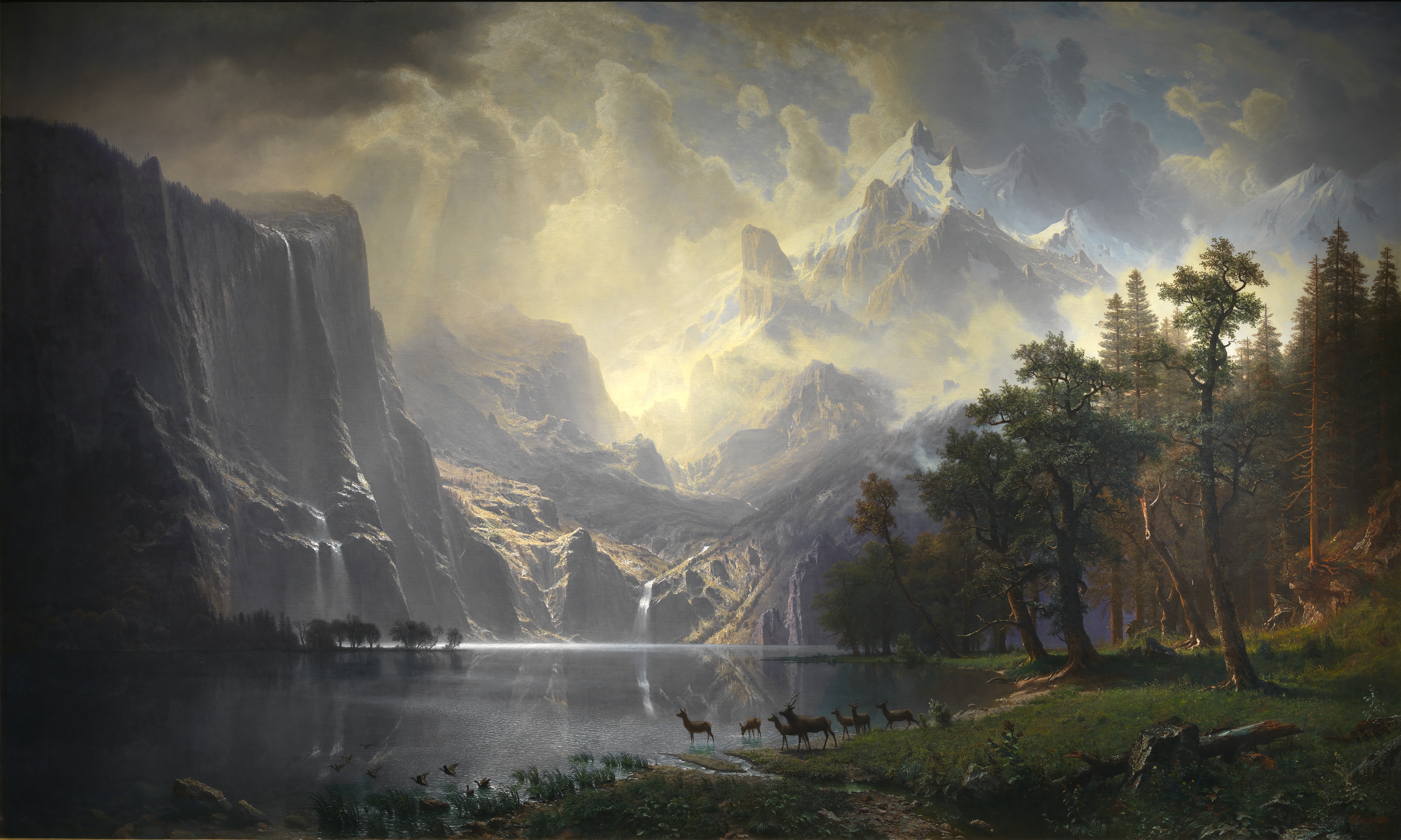
In the Sierra Nevada Mountains in California (1868), by Albert Bierstadt, Smithsonian American Art Museum, Washington D. C.

In painting, light is represented rather than physically present, allowing the artist full control over its origin, intensity, and visual effects. Light structures the composition, while shadow provides solidity, volume, and expressive potential.

The representation of light requires defining its nature (natural or artificial), origin, intensity, and chromatic qualities. Natural light varies with season, time of day, and weather; artificial light varies by source—candles, torches, lamps, neon, and so forth. Light may be focused or diffuse, and its chromatic value affects the tonality of objects, as well as the ambience and projected shadows. Colors appear fully saturated under correct illumination; in shadow, they darken and help define form.

Light is inseparable from pictorial space and thus from perspective. In linear perspective, light models volume through gradations of value; in aerial perspective, it reproduces atmospheric effects. The light source may appear within or outside the scene, and may act directly or indirectly. Spatial definition arises from the contrast of light and shadow, with value scales ranging from soft transitions to sharp contrasts. Spatial boundaries may be objective (objects, architecture, landscape) or subjective (atmosphere, depth, voids). In perception, light creates proximity and darkness distance, so a gradient from light to shadow produces a sense of depth.

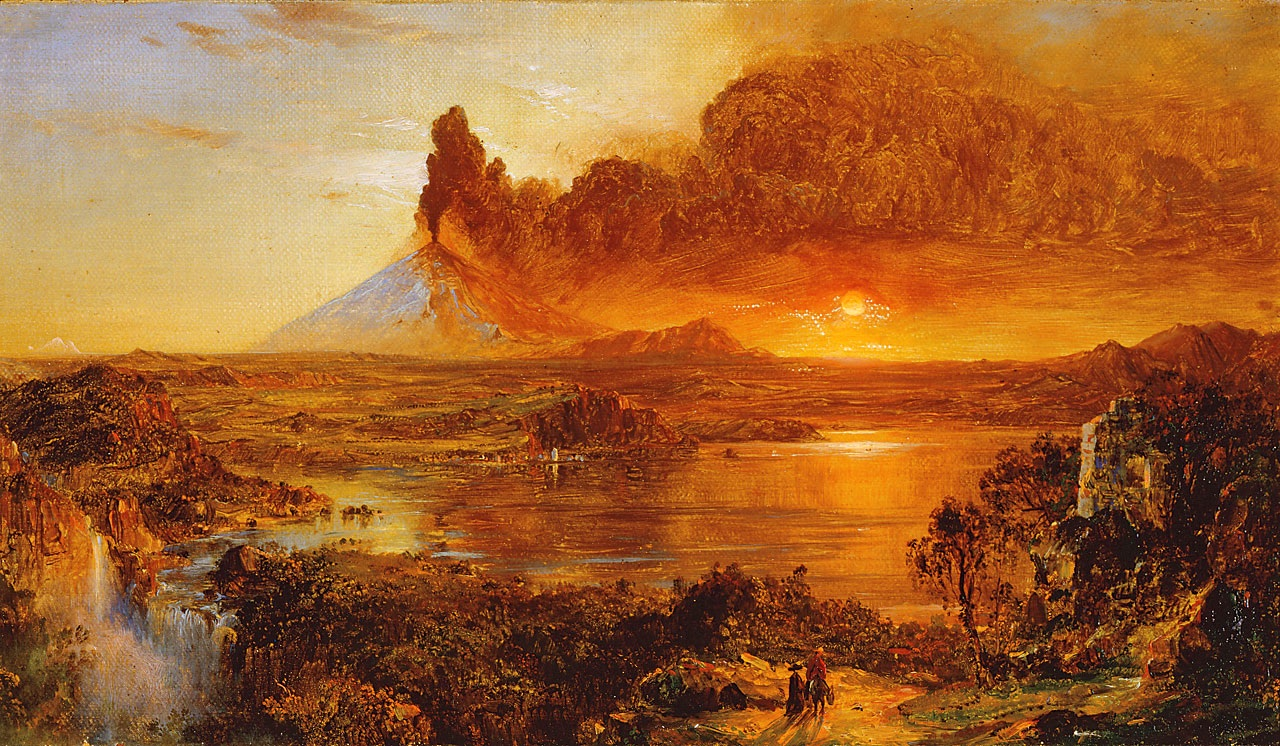
Cotopaxi (1862), de Frederic Edwin Church, Detroit Institute of Arts.

Aspects such as contrast, relief, texture, volume, gradients, and the tactile quality of an image depend on light. The interplay of light and shadow defines the position and orientation of objects in space; for accurate representation, the shape, density, and extent of shadows, as well as their variations in intensity, must be considered. Beyond its physical properties, light can also introduce dramatic effects and impart emotional atmosphere.

Contrast is a fundamental pictorial resource, shaping the structure of the image. It may be luminous—either chiaroscuro (light and shadow) or surface contrast (a point of strong brightness)—or chromatic, which may be tonal (contrast between tones) or based on saturation (a vivid color against a neutral one). These types of contrast often coincide in a single image. Varying the intensity of contrast is a principal artistic tool for determining expressive character, from softness to stark dramatization. Backlighting is one of the most dramatic effects, producing elongated shadows and deeper tonalities.

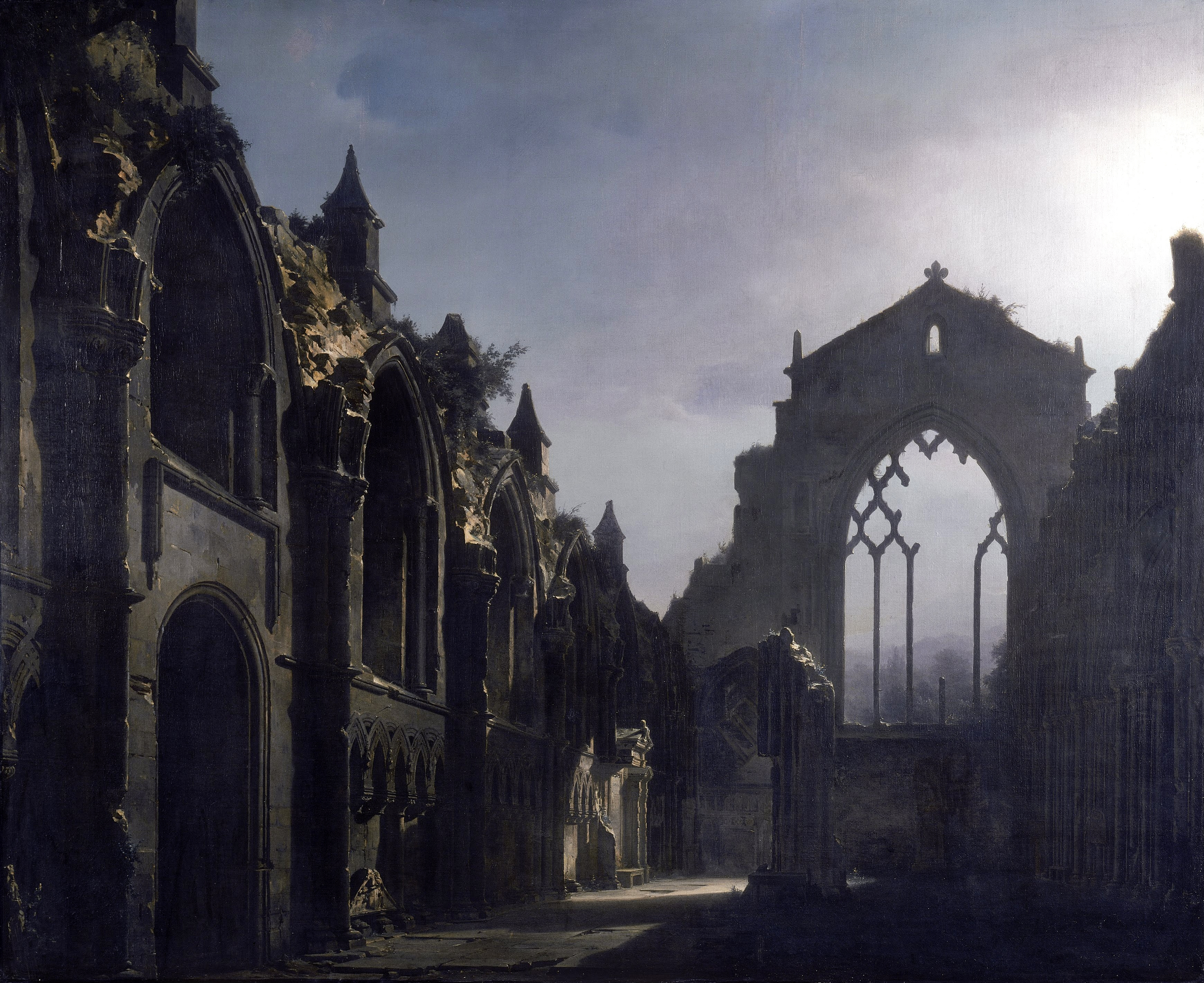
The Ruins of Holyrood Chapel (1824), by Louis Daguerre, Walker Art Gallery, Liverpool.

The correspondence between light, shadow, and color is established through tonal evaluation: the brightest tones appear in illuminated areas and the darkest where illumination is minimal. Once tonal values are set, the artist selects the appropriate color ranges. Colors are lightened by adding related lighter hues or white, and darkened by adding related dark hues, blue, or complementary colors. Generally, shading results from mixing a color with a darker related color, blue, and its complementary.

Chromatic and luminous harmony depends on the relationship among the colors within a painting. Harmony can be achieved through monochrome or tone-dominant ranges, using a single base color modified in value or tone; through harmonic trios (three equidistant colors on the chromatic circle) or quaternions (four colors); through contrasts between warm and cool ranges—a distinction based on subjective color temperature; through complementary harmonies, which yield strong chromatic contrast; and through broken ranges, produced by mixing primaries with their complements, creating subtle chromatic vibration and enhancing the luminosity of saturated colors.

=== Techniques ===
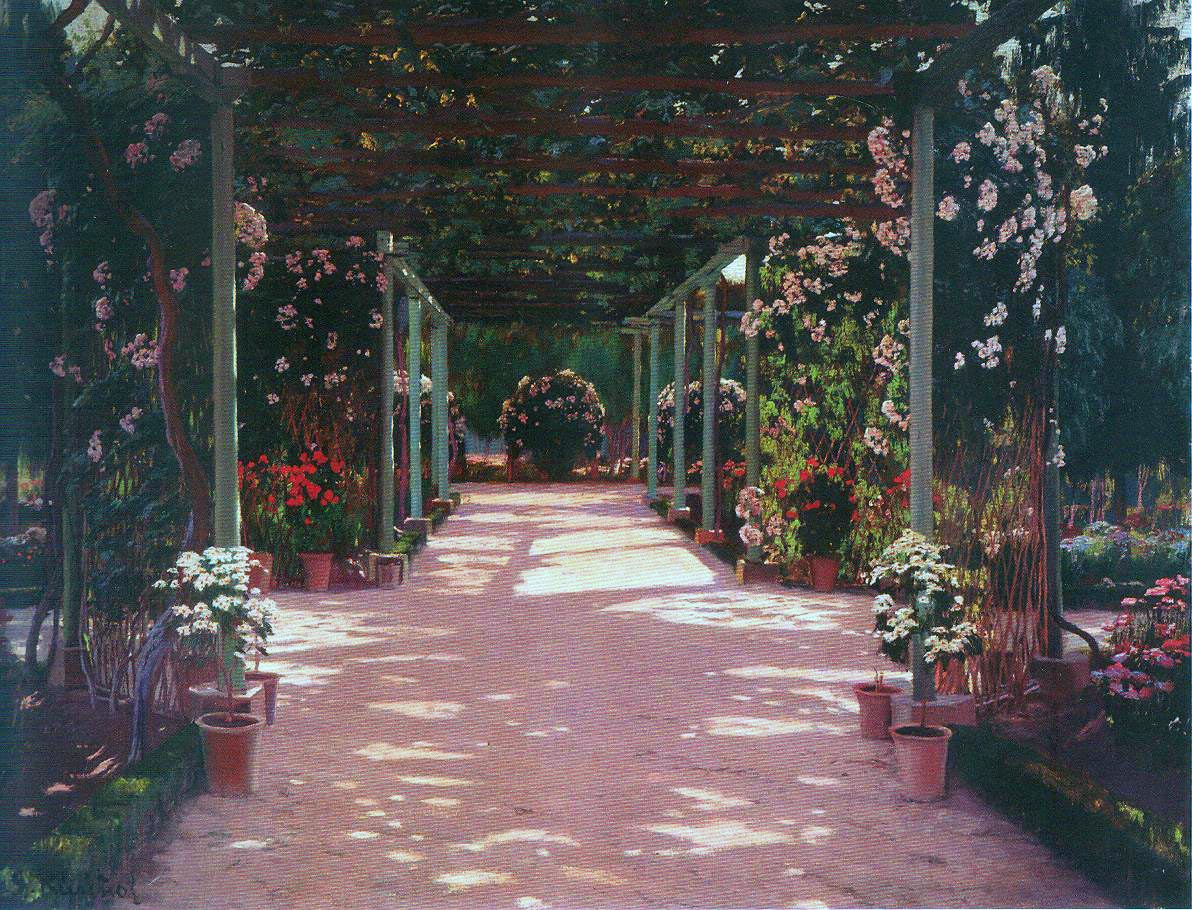
Oil painting: El emparrado (1914), by Santiago Rusiñol, private collection.

The quality and appearance of luminous representation are closely linked to artistic technique. Light effects depend largely on the materials and procedures employed. In drawing, whether with pencil or charcoal, light is expressed through the contrast between black and white, with the white usually being the paper itself; colored pencils offer limited contrast and are less suitable for chiaroscuro. Pencil drawing relies on line, hatching, and soft shading. Charcoal permits the use of gouache, white chalk, and tinted media such as sanguine or sepia to introduce highlights. Indian ink, another monochrome technique, produces strong chiaroscuro contrasts with minimal intermediate values, making it an expressive medium.

Oil painting dissolves pigments in oily binders (such as linseed, walnut, or almond oil), often mixed with turpentine. It is the technique that most effectively enhances light effects and chromatic nuance. Oil offers vivid colors, strong luminosity, and rich textures, while its slow drying time allows corrections and reworking. It can be applied with brushes, spatulas, or scrapers, producing textures from thin glazes to thick impastos, each generating different luminous qualities.

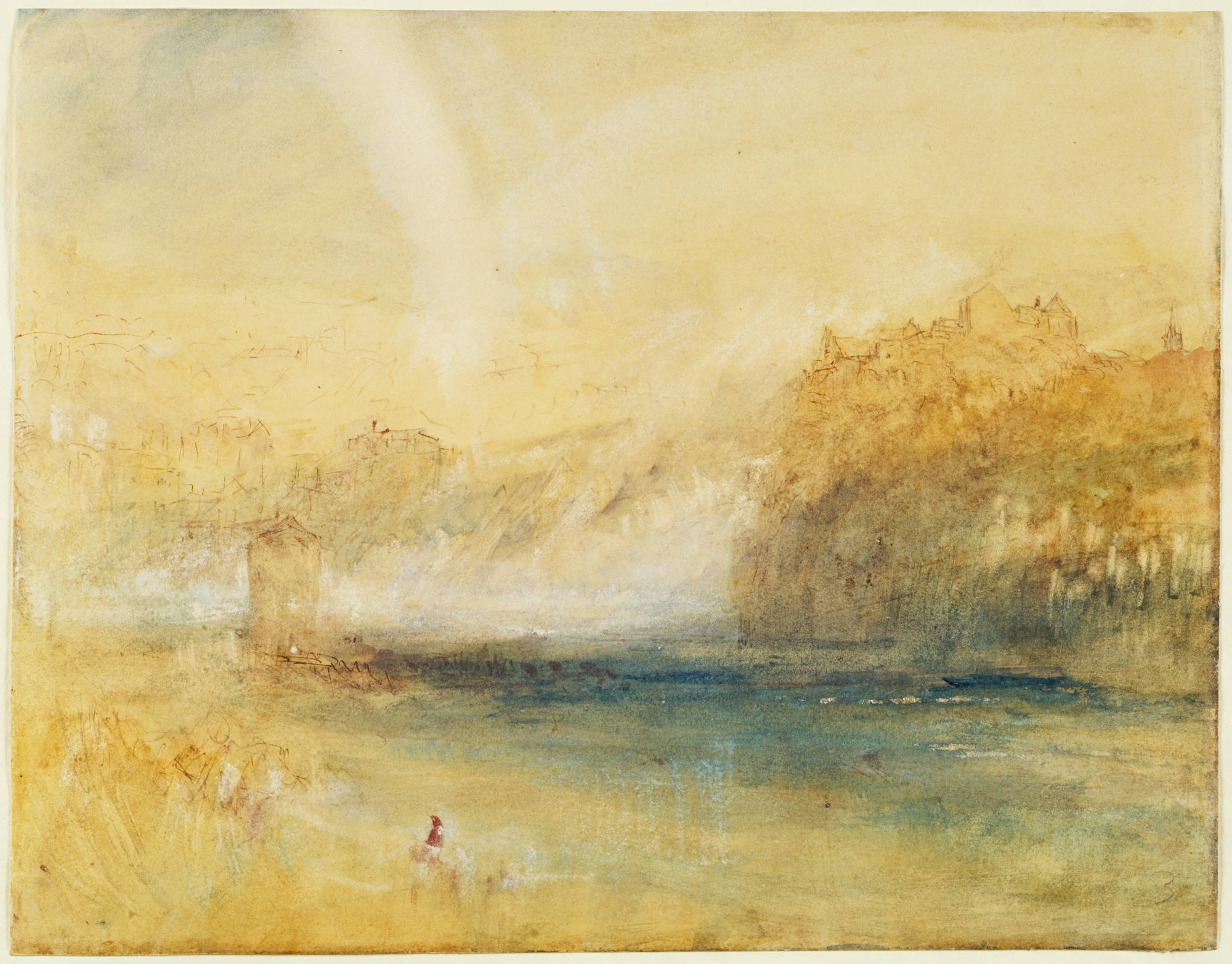
Watercolor: Rhine Falls at Schaffhausen (1841), by Joseph Mallord William Turner, Princeton University Art Museum.

Pastel uses pigments mixed with binders such as kaolin, gypsum, or gum arabic, formed into sticks and spread with a smudger. The technique combines properties of drawing and painting, offering freshness and immediacy.

Watercolor employs transparent pigments diluted in water with binders such as gum arabic or honey, relying on the paper’s white for luminosity. Its transparency enhances light effects, and the technique traditionally proceeds from light to dark, preserving white areas for highlights.

Acrylic painting mixes pigments with a plastic binder, producing rapid drying and resistance to corrosive agents. Its quick setting time allows for successive layers, flat tones, glazes, and work methods similar to oil, including gradients, blurring, and opaque applications.

=== Genres ===
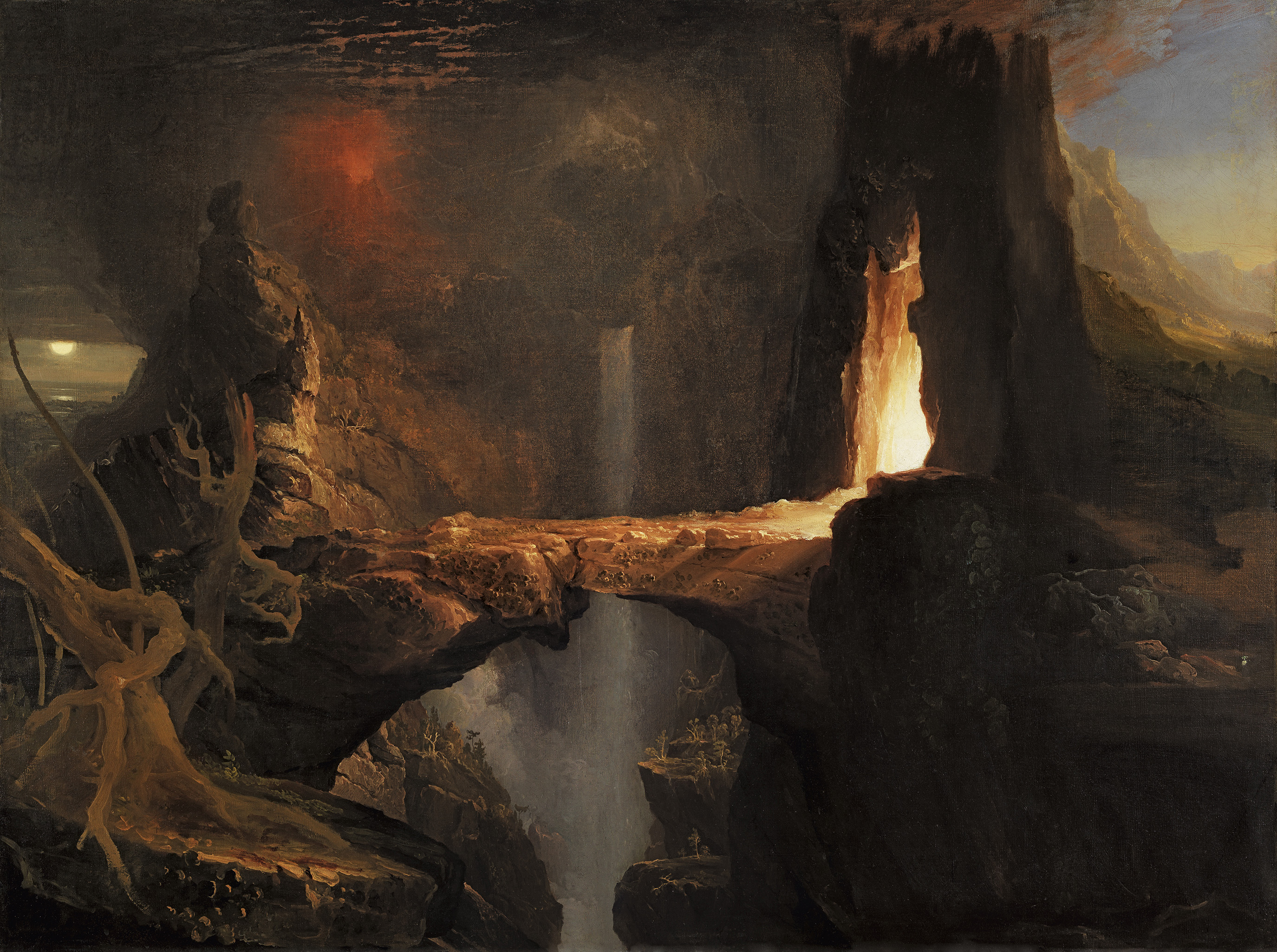
Religious painting: Expulsion. Moon and firelight (1828), by Thomas Cole, Museo Thyssen-Bornemisza, Madrid.

Light functions differently across pictorial genres, since its incidence varies in interiors, exteriors, objects, and the human figure. In interior scenes, light often creates intimate atmospheres, typically through indirect illumination filtered by windows, doors, or curtains. These settings favor private, enclosed environments with contrasts of light and shadow, areas of semi-darkness, and visual effects produced by dust and ambient diffusion. Still life (naturaleza muerta) is a distinct interior genre in which the artist can fully control lighting—whether lateral, frontal, zenithal, or backlit—while the main challenge lies in accurately rendering tones, textures, brightness, and transparency according to the materials depicted.

In exterior painting, landscape is the genre most dependent on light, as outdoor scenes are entirely shaped by the luminous atmosphere of the time of day, season, and weather. The three principal landscape types are land, sea, and sky. A central difficulty is capturing the precise tonal quality of natural light under constantly shifting conditions such as cloud cover, fog, or rain. Many artists work en plen air to observe these effects directly. Urban landscapes, frequent since the 20th century, require attention to artificial lighting and neon effects, producing sharper contrasts, pronounced planes, and often cooler or grayer chromatic ranges.

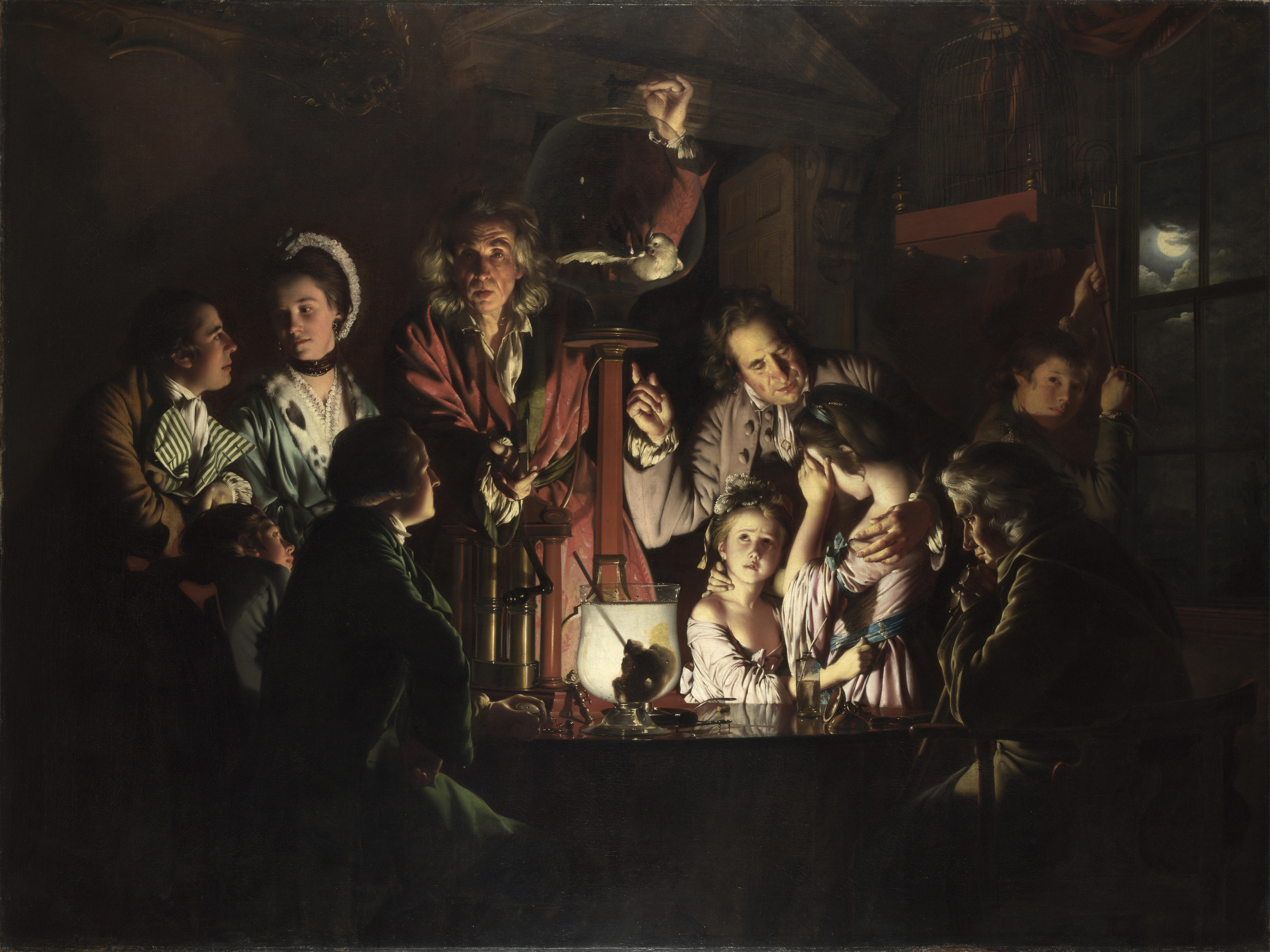
Genre painting: An Experiment on a Bird in an Air Pump (1768), by Joseph Wright of Derby, The National Gallery, London.

Light is equally fundamental in depicting the human figure, influencing volume, contour, and the limits defined by shadow. It nuances the body’s surface and softens the appearance of skin. The direction of light transforms the figure’s modeling: frontal light reduces shadows and depth; partial lateral light enhances volume; strong lateral light darkens one side; backlighting outlines the figure with a luminous halo; and overhead or underlighting distorts relief, sometimes producing ghostly effects. Shadows add expressive contours and tonal gradations, while direct light or shadow alters skin color. Filtered light, passing through objects such as fabrics or glass, produces additional chromatic variations on the body.

Portraiture applies these principles with greater precision due to its emphasis on accurate physiognomy and psychological expression. Drawing establishes the structural basis of the face, while light and color construct its volume and likeness.

In the 20th century, abstraction introduced a non-figurative pictorial language focused on subjective expression. Although it dispenses with representational imagery, light often remains crucial, contributing luminosity to color or generating contrasts that evoke expressive or atmospheric effects.

=== Chronological factor ===
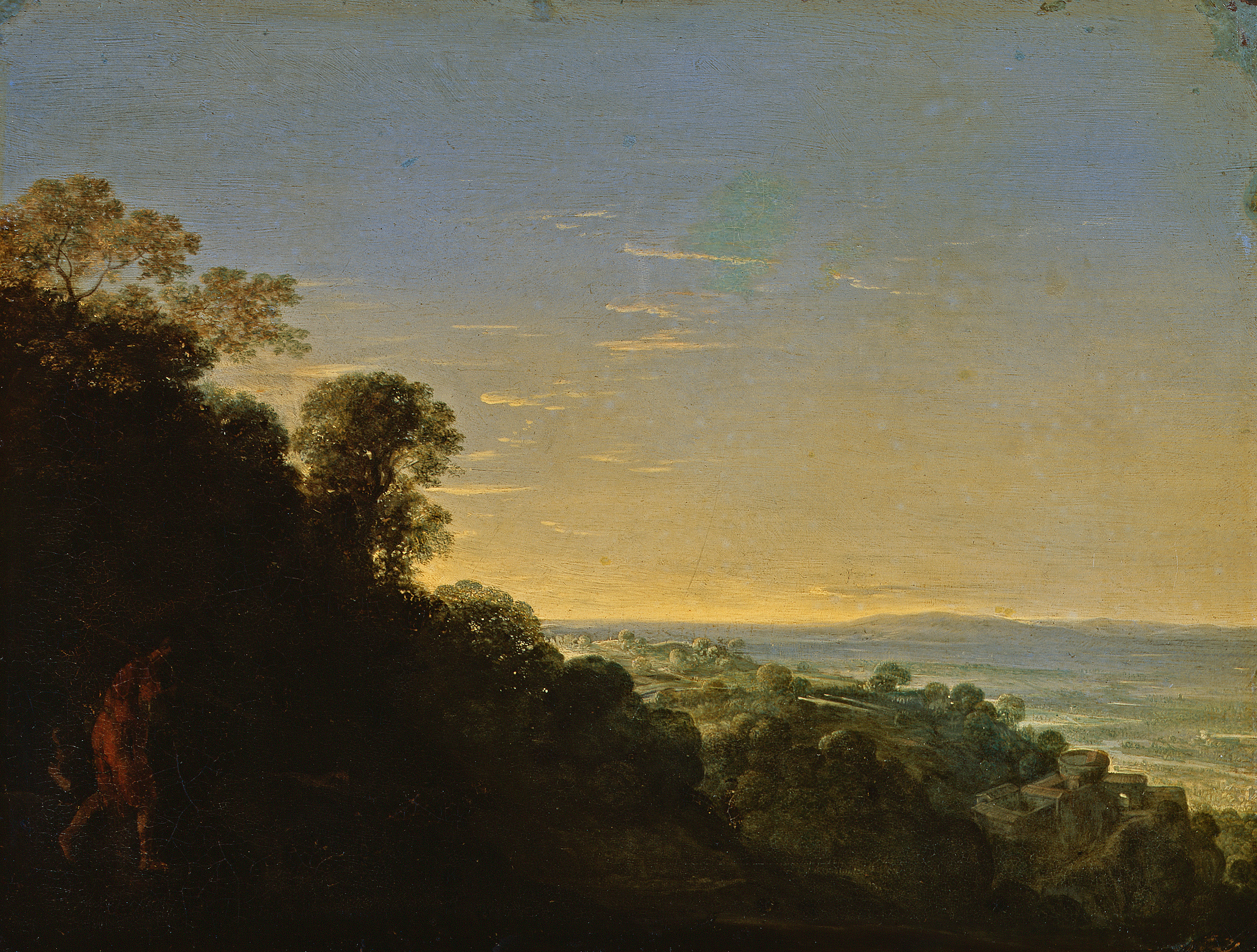
The Aurora (1606), by Adam Elsheimer, Herzog Anton Ulrich-Museum, Brunswick.

Light is also a determining factor in the representation of time in painting. Before the Renaissance, artists rarely depicted specific moments of the day; distinctions usually concerned only interior versus exterior lighting. Often, the direction, intensity, or length of shadows does not allow us to identify the precise time of day. Night scenes were uncommon until Mannerism and were typically employed only when required by the narrative or symbolic intent. In works such as Giotto's Annunciation to the Shepherds or Ambrogio Lorenzetti's Annunciation, nocturnal light heightens the mystery surrounding Christ’s birth; in Uccello's Saint George and the Dragon, night symbolizes evil. Conversely, scenes that historically occur at night—such as the Last Supper—were sometimes illuminated as daytime scenes, as in Andrea del Sarto’s interpretation.

Traditionally, the time of day functioned as a narrative complement rather than a strict chronological reference. Until the 19th century, before the development of modern artificial lighting, artists worked within approximate temporal conventions: dawn suggested travel or hunting; noon indicated action or rest; dusk implied return or contemplation; and night evoked sleep, fear, adventure, festivity, or passion. Morning symbolized birth, while night symbolized death.

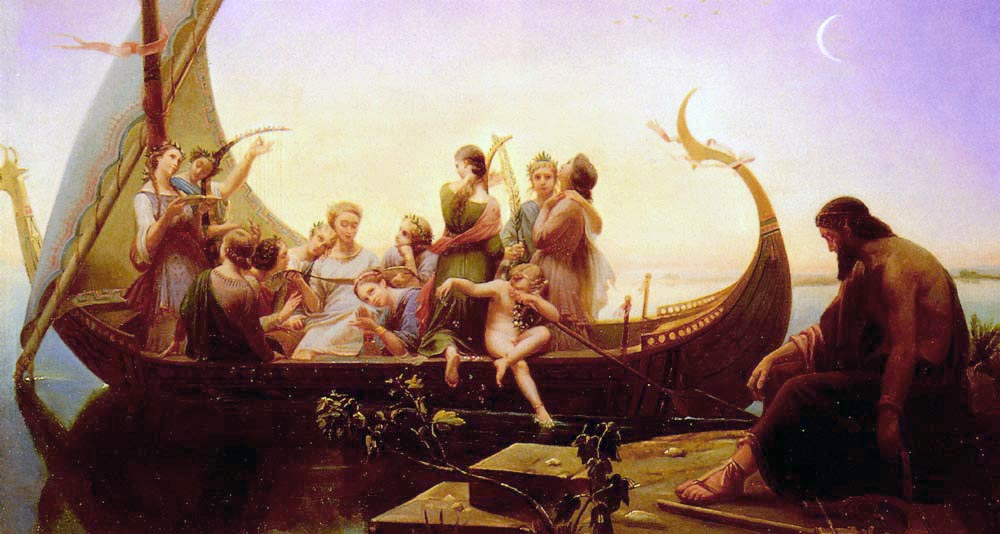
The Afternoon or The Lost Illusions (1843), by Charles Gleyre, private collection

The temporal dimension gained prominence in the 17th century, when painters such as Claude Lorrain and Salvator Rosa began to free landscape from narrative content and explore nature as the central subject, varying only the time of day or season. This approach evolved through 18th-century Vedutism and 19th-century Romantic landscape, reaching its highest development in Impressionism.

Dawn—variously defined as the first light of the sky (aurora) or the moment of sunrise—was seldom employed to illuminate the foreground until the 17th century, appearing mainly as distant landscape fragments. Its spherical, diffused light was difficult to integrate before the introduction of Leonardo’s aerial perspective.

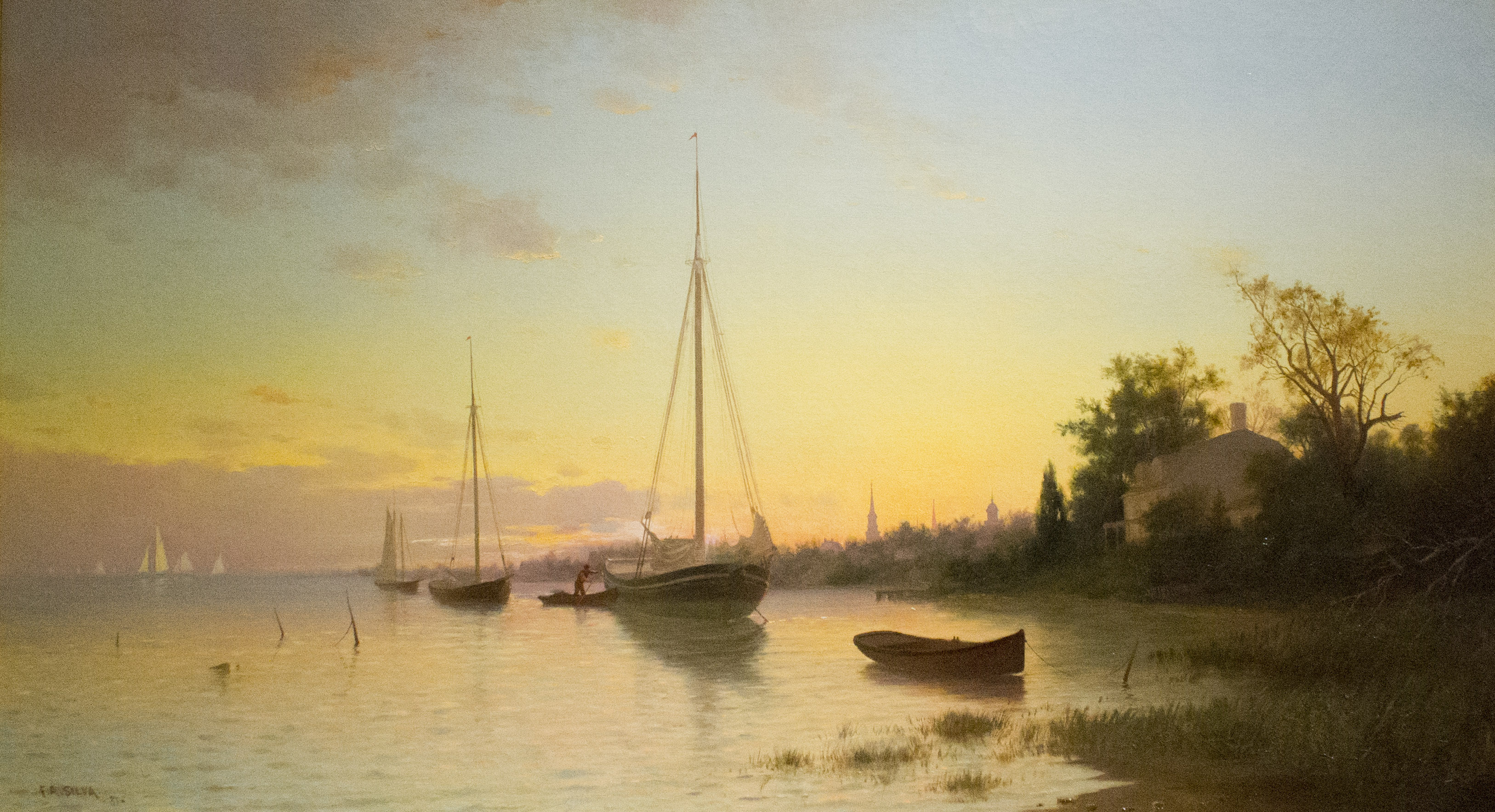
Atardecer (1881), de Francis Augustus Silva, New Britain Museum of American Art, New Britain (Connecticut).

Milizia regarded dawn as the most suitable light for landscape painting.

Noon and the hours surrounding it have traditionally provided a stable basis for objective representation, though distinguishing the precise moment is often difficult due to variations in intensity. Exact midday, however, was generally discouraged because of its dazzling brightness.

Most art treatises favored afternoon light, commonly used from the Renaissance through the 18th century. Vasari recommended placing the sun to the east, asserting that this enhanced the relief and quality of the figure.

Early modern painting typically restricted sunset to the reddened celestial vault without fully harmonizing its illumination with figures and objects. Leonardo initiated a more naturalistic study of twilight, observing that the reddened light of the sun and clouds must be reflected coherently on all illuminated bodies; otherwise, the depiction becomes “vain and false.”

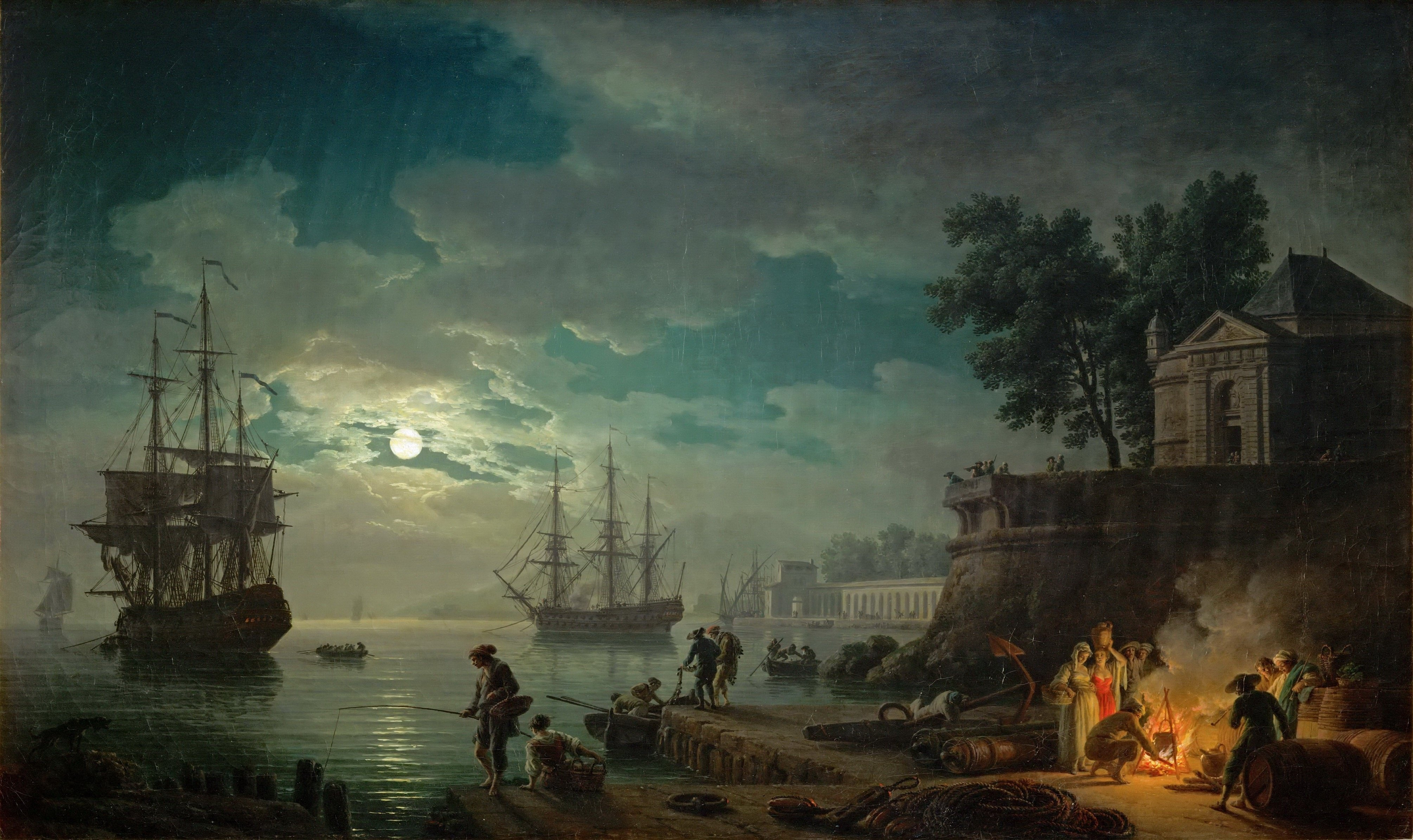
Seaport by Moonlight (1771), by Claude Joseph Vernet, Louvre Museum, Paris.

Milizia, however, regarded this moment as risky, since its brilliance demands careful observation.

Night has long been a distinctive pictorial setting, eventually forming the genre of the nocturne. Nocturnal scenes are illuminated by the Moon, stars, or artificial light (bonfires, torches, candles, and later gas or electric lighting). Historically, night scenes were justified mainly by iconographic needs. As painting shifted in the 14th century toward an objective spatial and temporal framework, Renaissance artists generally avoided nocturnal settings, which conflicted with their requirements for clarity and stable illumination in linear perspective. Lorenzo Ghiberti argued that objects cannot be seen in darkness, and Leonardo maintained that darkness is the absence of light; he accepted night scenes only when illuminated by fire, effectively rendering them diurnal in appearance. Leonardo’s sfumato, however, opened the way for a more naturalistic depiction of night by allowing the atmospheric blue-white of distance to shift toward bluish black, creating spatial depth through the dissolution of background forms. This development reached its height in Baroque tenebrism, where darkness heightened drama and emphasized illuminated areas, often with symbolic meaning. In the 17th century, nocturnal representation also gained scientific grounding through improved astronomical observation, particularly after Galileo's telescope. By the 19th century, innovations in artificial lighting expanded nighttime activity and imagery, making the nocturne a subject of modern life—a transformation especially embraced by the Impressionists.

== Symbology ==
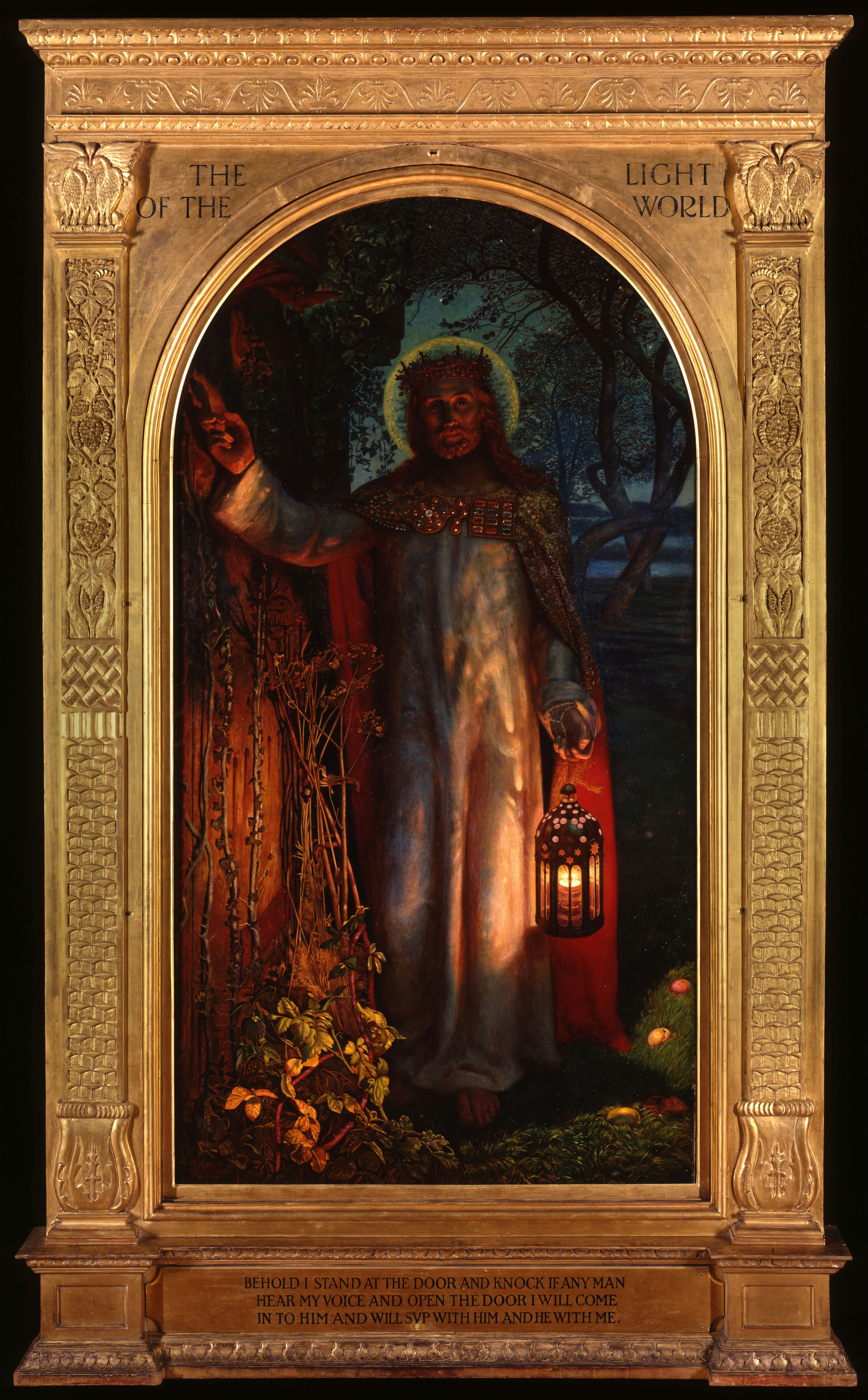
The Light of the World (1900-1904), by William Holman Hunt, St Paul's Cathedral, London. Christ knocks on a door representing the human soul and carries a lantern in allusion to his phrase "I am the light of the world, he who follows me shall not walk in darkness, for he shall have the light of life" (John 8:12).

Throughout the history of painting, light has frequently carried an aesthetic dimension—identifying luminosity with beauty—as well as a symbolic one. It has been associated with religion, knowledge, virtue, happiness, life, and, more broadly, with the spiritual and immaterial. Conversely, shadows and darkness have evoked evil, death, ignorance, immorality, misfortune, or secrecy. Many religions and philosophical traditions have been structured around this duality of light and darkness—Ahura Mazda and Ahriman, yin and yang, angels and demons, spirit and matter, among others. The immaterial and ethereal nature of light likely contributed to its spiritual connotations, which extended metaphorically to related phenomena such as color, shadow, radiance, and evanescence.

The association of light with transcendence is ancient and predates written formulations. In many early religions, deities embodied light: the Semitic Baal, the Egyptian Ra, and the Iranian Ahura Mazda are prominent examples. Many ancient peoples embraced a “metaphor of light” tied to immortality, imagining the afterlife as a realm bathed in star-like radiance. Cultures across the ancient Mediterranean conceived of an infinite luminous space where souls would rest—an idea later taken up by Aristotle and Christian authors such as Saint Basil and Saint Augustine. Numerous religious rituals, from Babylonian ceremonies to Pythagorean practices, were centered on illumination as a means of purification.

In Greek mythology Apollo was often represented encircled by a radiant disk, illustrating the symbolic link between light, aesthetics, and intellectual inspiration. The dawn goddess Eos (Aurora in Roman mythology) embodied the renewal of daylight. In Greek thought, light signified life and beauty; its fluctuations were sometimes associated with emotional or intellectual states. Darkness, by contrast, suggested the hidden and the malign, as in the shadowy specters of Tartarus. Philosophically, the Greeks identified the sun with “intelligent light” (φῶς νοετόν), a principle animating the cosmos, and Plato famously drew a parallel between light and knowledge.

The Romans distinguished between lux (the source of light) and lumen (the rays that proceed from it), concepts employed metaphorically in expressions such as lux gloriae, lux intelligibilis, lumen naturale, and lumen gratiae.

Christian tradition also closely associates divinity with light—a theme systematized by Pseudo-Dionysius the Areopagite in works such as The Celestial Hierarchy and The Divine Names, drawing on Neoplatonic precedents. For him, “Light derives from Good and is the image of Goodness.” In the 9th century, John Scotus Eriugena described God as “the father of lights". The Bible itself opens with the divine command “Let there be light” (Gen 1:3) and affirms that “God saw that the light was good” (Gen 1:4). The Greek translation rendered “good” as καλός (kalós), aligning goodness with beauty (the ideal of kalokagathía), a conceptual link that persisted in Christian thought even after the Latin Vulgate adopted a more literal translation (bonum). Scripture consistently identifies light with God, and Christ declares: “I am the light of the world… he will have the light of life” (Jn 8:12). This theological symbolism inspired Christian practices such as the “eternal light” burning in churches, the use of candles in memorials, and many other rites.

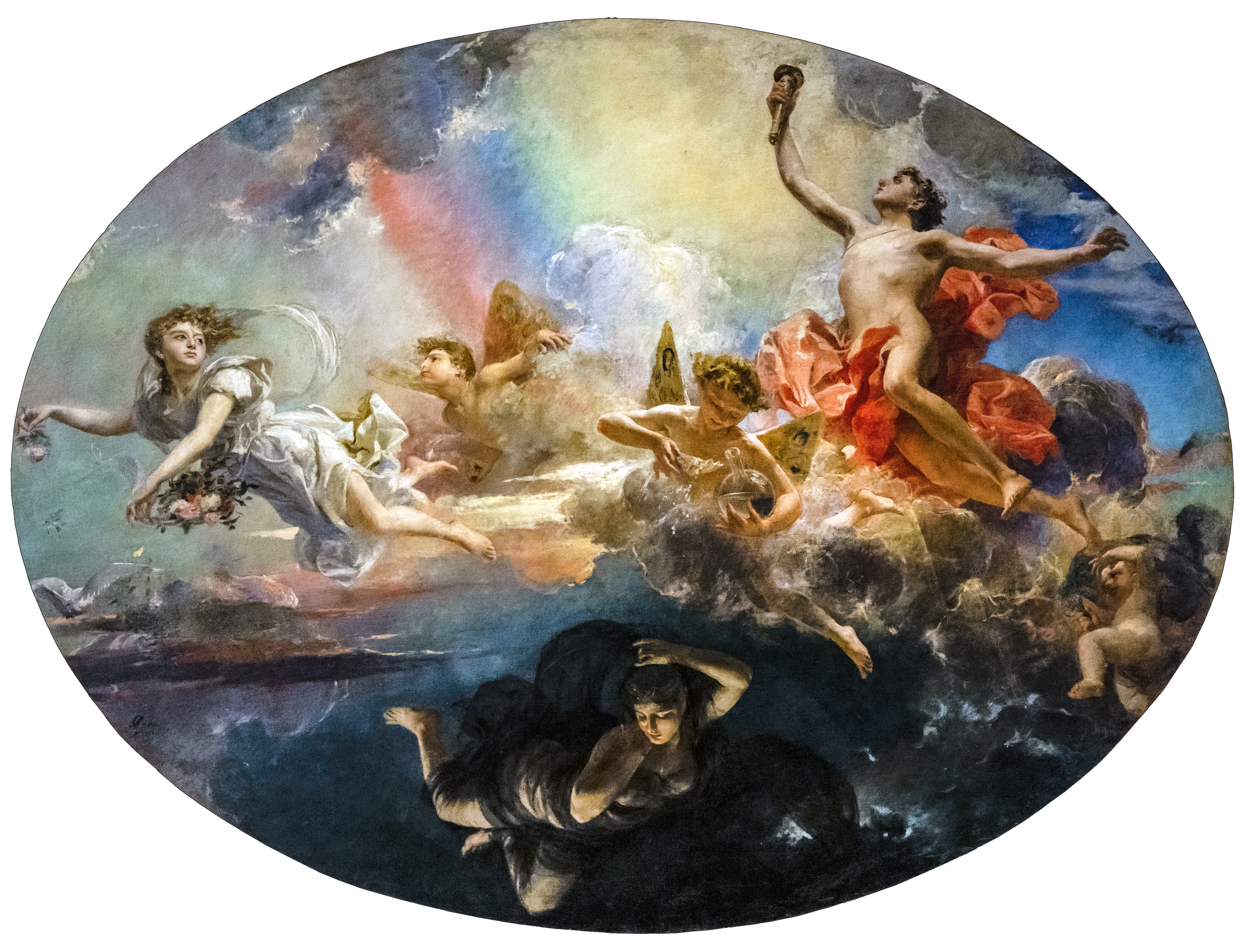
The Triumph of Day over Night preceded by the Aurora (1882), by Antonio Caba, Museo Nacional de Arte de Cataluña, Spain.

Light is pervasive in Christian iconography. The conception of Jesus is often depicted as a ray of light entering Mary during the Annunciation; medieval writers such as Pseudo-Bernard compared this to sunlight passing through glass without breaking it—an idea echoed in the luminous theology of Gothic stained glass, where light manifests divine presence. Christ has been symbolically associated with the Sun, and Mary with the Dawn that precedes it. Beyond these metaphors, light in Christianity represents truth, virtue, and salvation. In patristic theology, it signifies eternity and the heavenly realm: Saint Bernard wrote that separated souls will be “plunged into an immense ocean of eternal light.” Early Christian baptism was even called “illumination".

In Orthodox Christianity, light is not merely a symbol but a real manifestation of divinity. Because of its opposition to darkness, light has also served apotropaic functions—lamps, candles, and fires accompany rites such as circumcisions, baptisms, weddings, and funerals as signs of purification and protection.

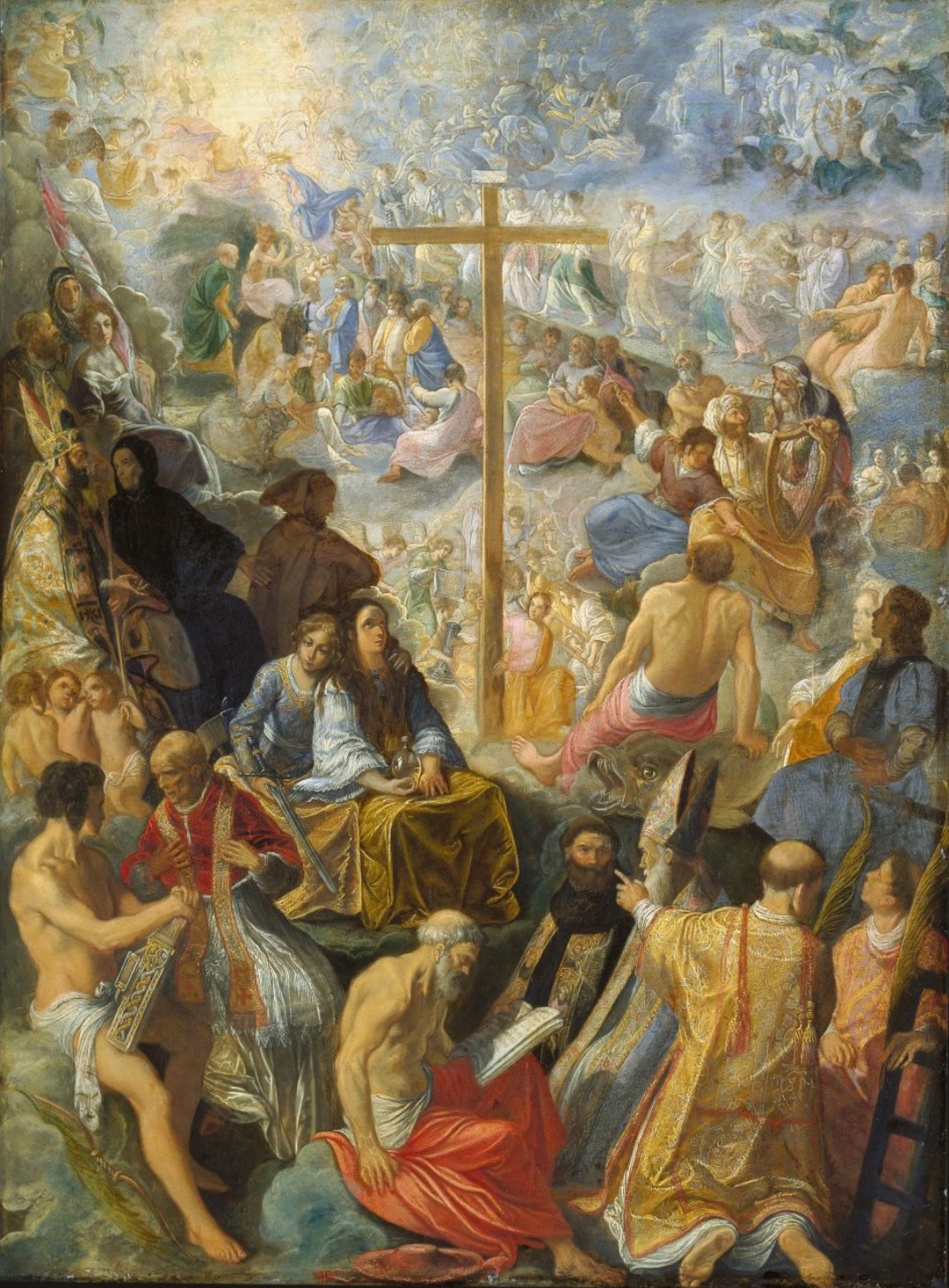
The Exaltation of the Cross from the Frankfurt Tabernacle (ca. 1605), by Adam Elsheimer, Städel Institute of Art, Frankfurt am Main.

In Christian iconography, light frequently appears in halos, particularly in medieval art, where saints, angels, and members of the Holy Family are often depicted with a golden nimbus encircling their heads. In Fra Angelico’s The Annunciation, rays of light radiate from the figure of the archangel Gabriel, emphasizing his divinity; the same technique is used for the dove symbolizing the Holy Spirit. Light can also represent God directly, as in Piero della Francesca’s The Baptism of Christ (1445), where rays of sunlight indicate the divine presence. Conversely, light may signify God’s wrath, as in Giorgione’s The Tempest (1505). Beyond the divine, light sometimes conveys eternity or the fleeting nature of life; in the vanitas genre, intense beams illuminate objects symbolizing transience, as in Harmen Steenwijck’s Vanities (1645), where a skull is highlighted by a powerful shaft of light.

From the 14th to the 15th centuries, Italian painters employed supernatural light in night scenes to depict miracles, as in Taddeo Gaddi's Annunciation to the Shepherds (Santa Croce, Florence) and Gentile da Fabriano's Stigmatization of Saint Francis (1420). In the 16th century, artists such as Matthias Grünewald (Risen Christ, 1512–1516, Isenheim Altarpiece) and Titian (Annunciation,1564) used luminous effects to underscore miraculous events. In the 17th century, Rembrandt and Caravaggio identified light with divine grace and as a force acting against evil. The Baroque period marked the height of symbolic light: unlike medieval art—where luminosity, often rendered with gold leaf, did not correspond to actual illumination—Renaissance artists explored light for aesthetic and experimental purposes. Rembrandt uniquely combined these approaches, portraying divine light as both sensory and symbolic, a medium of revelation.

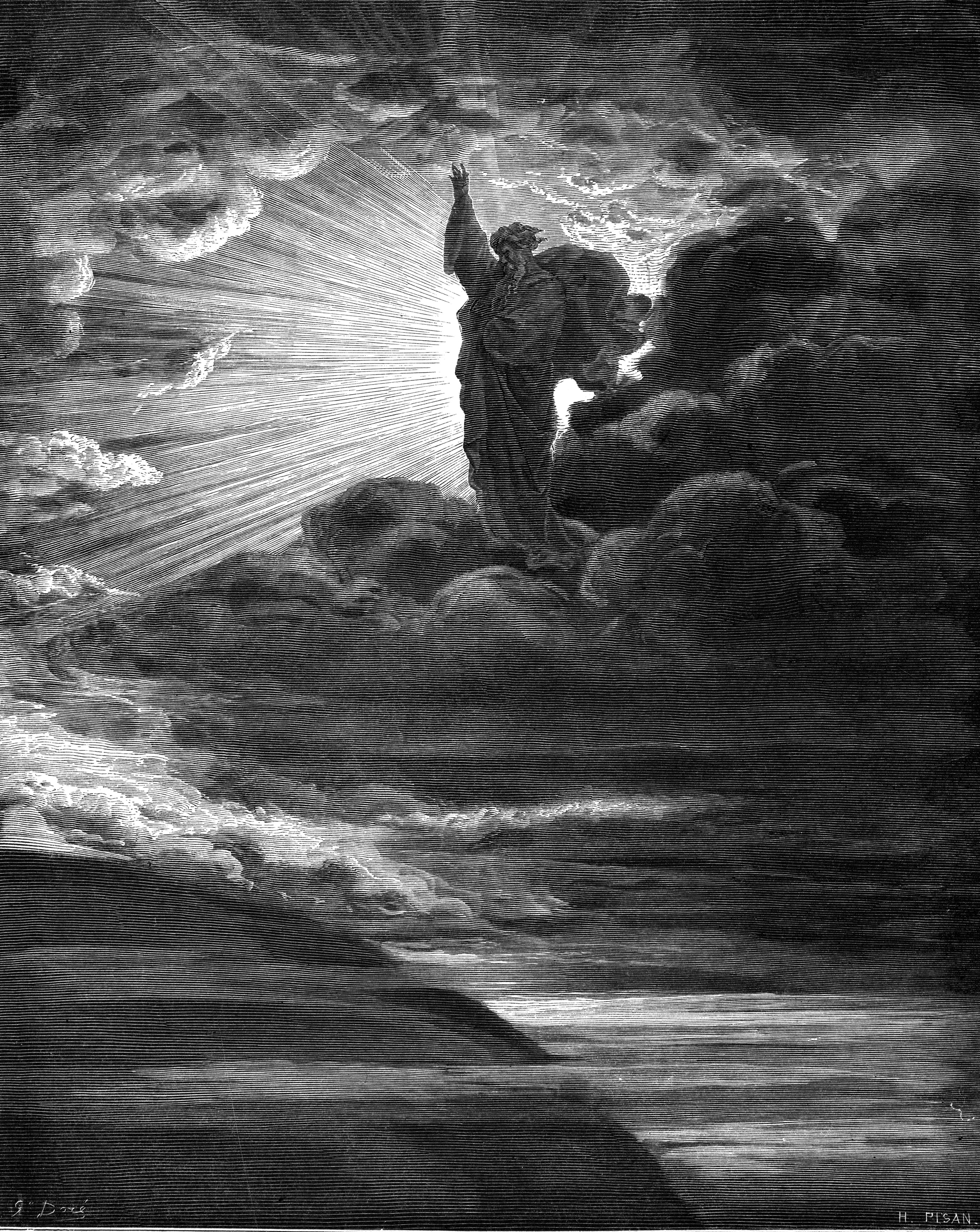
The Creation of Light by the Word of the Creator (1866), by Gustave Doré.

Between the 17th and 18th centuries, mystical notions of light gave way to philosophical rationalism. Light evolved from a divine phenomenon to a symbol of knowledge, goodness, and rebirth, contrasted with ignorance, evil, and death. Descartes conceptualized an “inner light” capable of perceiving eternal truths, a notion further developed by Leibniz, who distinguished between lumière naturelle (natural light) and lumière révélée (revealed light).

In the 19th century, German Romantic thinkers such as Friedrich Schlegel, Friedrich Schelling, and Hegel associated light with nature in a pantheistic sense. Schelling considered light a medium for the movement of the “universal soul” (Weltseele), while Hegel described it as the “ideality of matter,” the foundation of the material world.

By the late 19th and early 20th centuries, scientific conceptions of light dominated. Early modern theories included the corpuscular model, supported by Descartes and Newton, and the wave model, defended by Huygens, Young, and Fresnel. Maxwell later unified these concepts into an electromagnetic theory, and Einstein ultimately reconciled the wave and particle descriptions.

In landscape painting, light often retains symbolic meaning. Dawn and the transition from night to day may signify the divine order or the cosmic system, transcending human will; dawn can also symbolize renewal and Christ’s redemption. The sun and day are commonly associated with vitality, energy, and masculinity, whereas the moon and night evoke rest, spirituality, femininity, and sometimes death.

Light carries transcendent significance in other religions as well. In Buddhism, it represents truth and the triumph over matter on the path to nirvana. In Hinduism, light symbolizes wisdom, spiritual understanding, and union with the divine (atman), and it is associated with Krishna, the "Lord of Light". In Islam, the sacred name Nûr denotes divine illumination; the Quran states: “Allah is the light of the heavens and the earth. Light upon light! Allah guides to His light whomever He wills” (24:35). In Jewish Kabbalah, the primordial light Or or Awr divides the universe between realms of light and darkness. Synagogues often maintain an “eternal light” (ner tamid). In Freemasonry, light represents enlightenment and spiritual ascent. Certain Masonic symbols—the compass, the square, and the holy book—are termed “great lights,” and principal officers are referred to as “lights.” Initiation into Freemasonry is itself described as “receiving the light,” emphasizing its central role in the symbolic and moral instruction of the order.

== History ==
The use of light is intrinsic to painting and has been present since prehistoric times, when cave paintings exploited the unevenness of rock surfaces to create effects of light and relief. Systematic experimentation with the technical representation of light, however, did not emerge until classical Greco-Roman art. Francisco Pacheco noted in El arte de la pintura (1649) that “adumbration was invented by Surias of Samos,” referring to the depiction of a horse’s shadow observed in sunlight. Apollodorus of Athens is traditionally credited with the invention of chiaroscuro, based on the contrast between light and shadow to create a sense of luminous reality on a flat surface. Greek scenographers also developed skiagraphia, a technique using black-and-white contrasts, which earned them the name “shadow painters".

Early scientific reflections on light likewise originated in Greece. Aristotle described colors as mixtures of sunlight with the elements and defined darkness as the absence of light. Among painters, Apelles was celebrated by Pliny for depicting phenomena such as thunder and lightning, while Nicias of Athens was praised for his careful use of light and shade to achieve the illusion of relief.

With the development of landscape painting, artists devised methods to suggest depth through gradations of light and shadow: strong contrasts in the foreground diminished progressively toward the background. Modeling was achieved through tonal variation rather than color mixing. Claudius Ptolemy explained in his Optics how such effects created the impression of distance “veiled by air.” This approach was later adopted in early Christian and Byzantine art, as in the apse mosaic of Sant’Apollinare in Classe, and spread as far as India, evident in the Buddhist murals of Ajantā.

In the 5th century the philosopher John Philoponus, in his commentary on Aristotle’s Meteorology, formulated a theory on the subjective effects of light and shadow in painting, later known as “Philoponus’ rule".

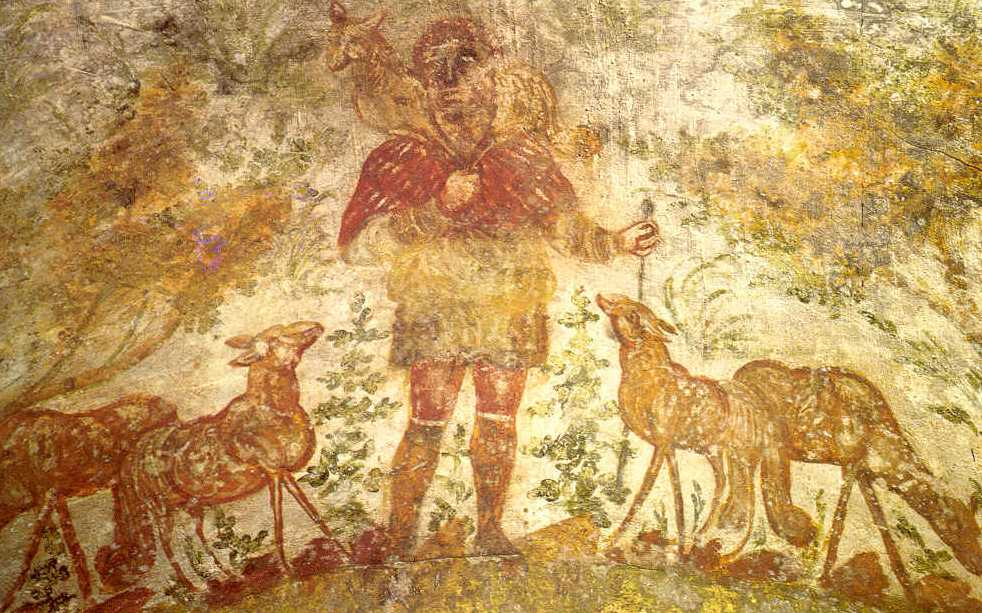
The Good Shepherd (c. 200), catacomb of Domitilla, Rome.

This effect was already known empirically in antiquity. Cicero observed that painters perceived more than ordinary people in umbris et eminentia (“in shadows and projections”), that is, depth and relief. Pseudo-Longinus likewise noted in On the Sublime that although light and shadow lie on the same plane, light immediately attracts the eye and appears closer.

Hellenistic art showed a marked interest in light effects, particularly in landscape painting, as seen in the stuccoes of La Farnesina. Chiaroscuro was widely employed in Roman painting, notably in the illusionistic architectures of Pompeii, though it largely disappeared during the Middle Ages. Vitruvius recommended northern light for painting because of its stability. In early Christian art, strong contrasts of light and shadow reappeared in sepulchral paintings and in the mosaics of Santa Pudenziana and Santa Maria Maggiore, a tendency sometimes described as “ancient impressionism".

Byzantine art inherited illusionistic light effects from Pompeian painting, but their function became symbolic rather than naturalistic. Luminosity and brilliance—especially of gold and precious stones—were emphasized for their spiritual meaning rather than pictorial realism. Such brilliance was identified with divine light, a view articulated by Abbot Suger in his justification of lavish materials.

Greek and Roman art together established the foundations of classicism, based on truthfulness, proportion, and harmony. Classical painting relied on drawing as the primary structural element, with color and shading applied in balanced proportion. These principles shaped a lasting artistic tradition, periodically revived in movements such as the Renaissance, Baroque classicism, Neoclassicism, and academic art.

=== Medieval art ===
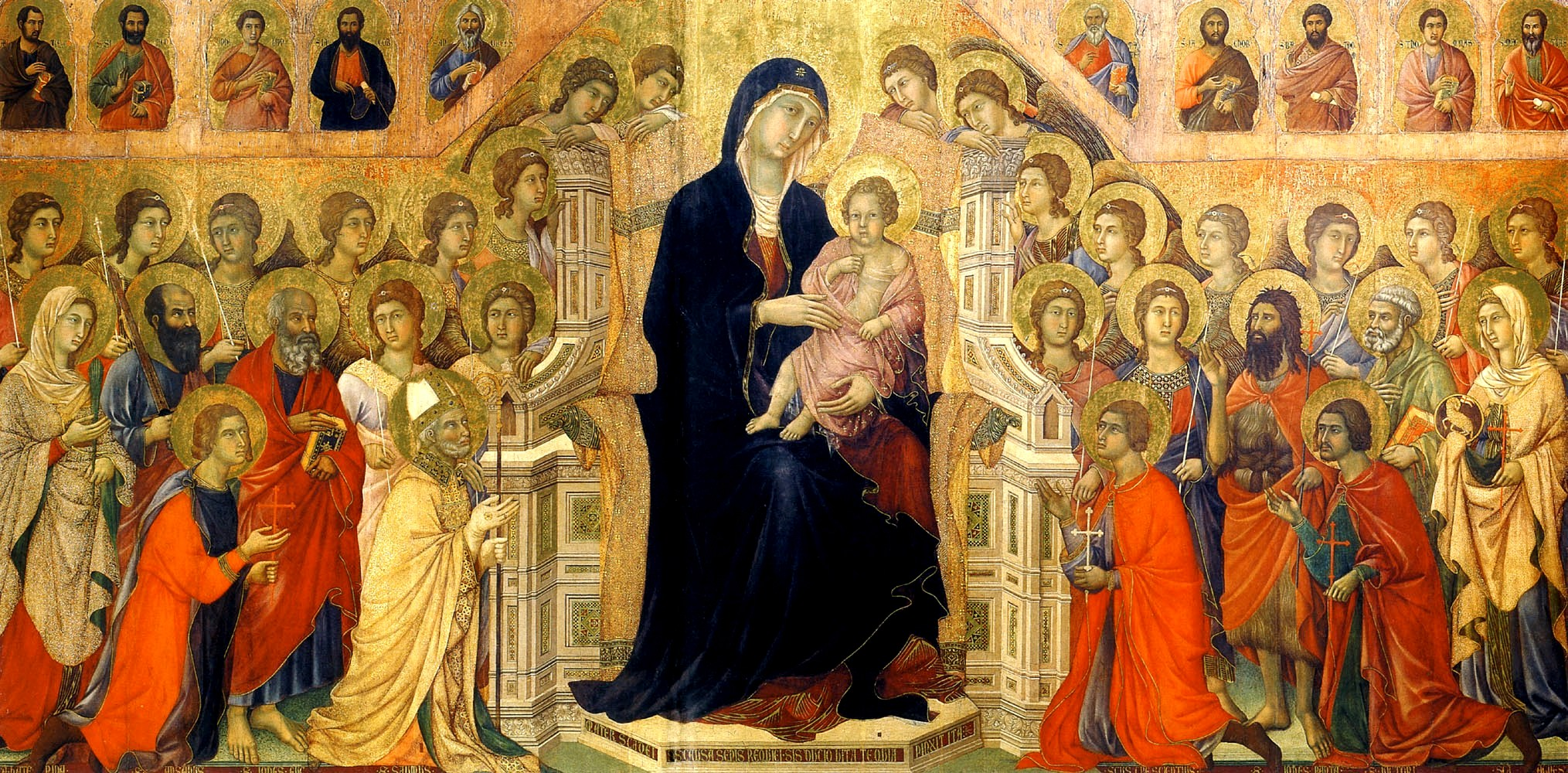
Madonna on the throne with Child, angels, and saints (1308-1311), central panel on the front face of the Maestà by Duccio, Museo dell'Opera Metropolitana del Duomo, Siena.

The art historian Wolfgang Schöne divided the history of painting in terms of light into two periods: “proper light” (Eigenlicht), characteristic of medieval art, and “illuminating light” (Beleuchtungslicht), developed in modern and contemporary art (Über das Licht in der Malerei, Berlin, 1979).

In the Middle Ages, light acquired a strong symbolic meaning, as it was regarded as a reflection of divinity. Medieval scholastic philosophy developed an aesthetics of light that identified luminosity with divine beauty, exerting a decisive influence on Gothic art. Gothic cathedrals were conceived as luminous spaces, with large stained-glass windows flooding interiors with light and creating an impression of boundlessness and transcendence. Structural innovations such as the pointed arch, ribbed vault, and flying buttresses made possible extensive openings, increasing transparency and luminosity. Stained glass modulated incoming light, producing shifting effects of color and illumination throughout the day.

Light was also associated with beauty and perfection. Saint Bonaventure held that the perfection of bodies depends on their luminosity, while William of Auxerre likewise linked beauty to radiance. This aesthetic developed alongside advances in optics and the physics of light, particularly in the work of Roger Bacon, as well as in the reception of Alhacen’s writings, later systematized by Witelo in De perspectiva and Adam Pulchrae Mulieris in Liber intelligentiis.

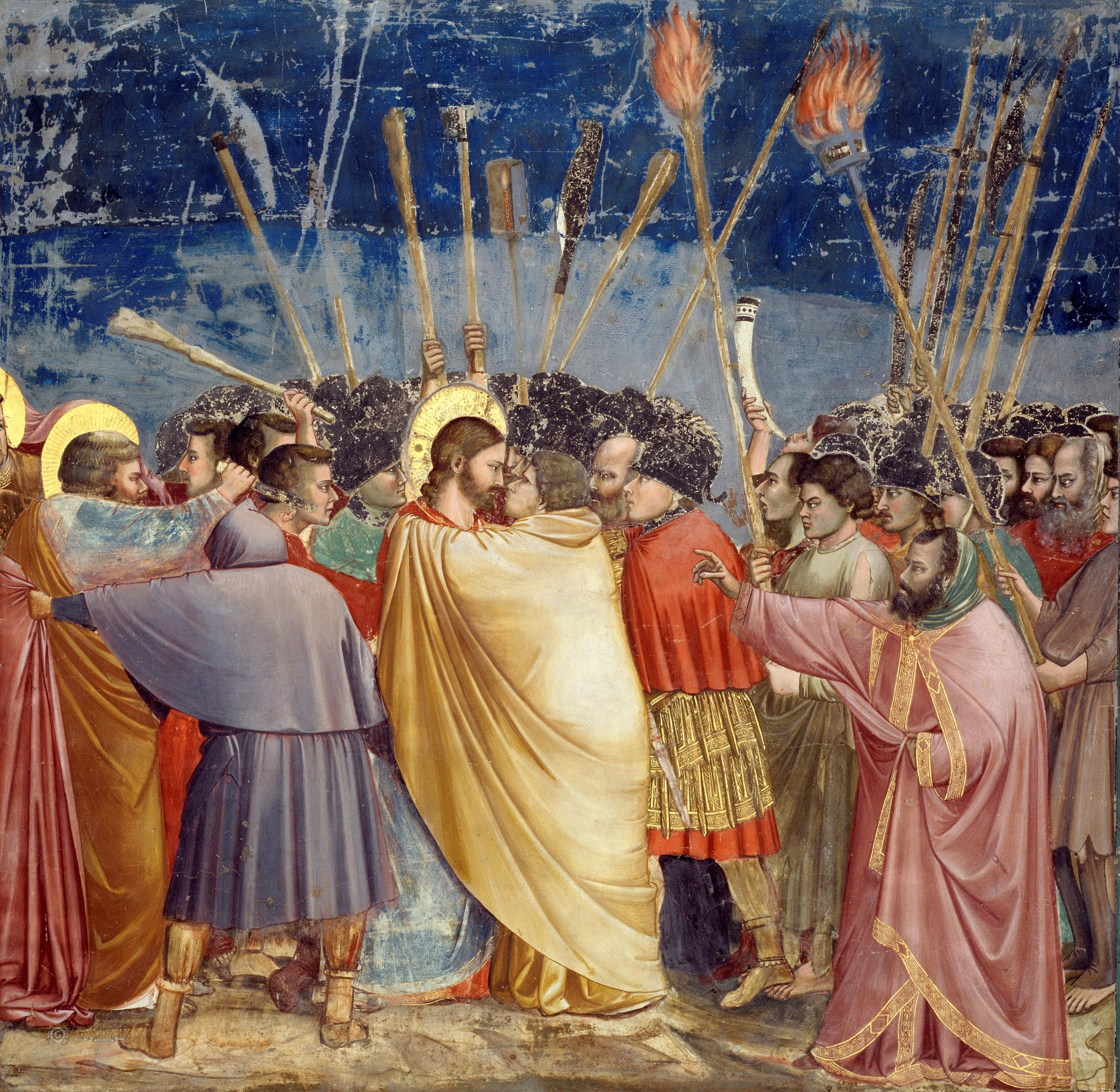
The Kiss of Judas (1304-1306), by Giotto, Scrovegni Chapel, Padua.

The medieval emphasis on light influenced all the arts. Daniel Boorstin noted that light fostered innovative artistic forms because of its immediacy and transience. In manuscript illumination, light was conveyed through the use of pure, saturated colors and precious materials, especially gold and silver. Luminosity resulted from the juxtaposition of colors rather than from shading or chiaroscuro, and objects appeared self-luminous, without volumetric modeling.

In painting, however, light did not assume the same role as in architecture. Medieval “proper light” was symbolic and detached from physical reality: it lacked a defined source, did not interact with the viewer, and was not articulated through shadow. Chiaroscuro was largely absent, as shadow was associated with evil. Light, understood as divine, illuminated all elements uniformly, producing flat, weightless, and immaterial images that emphasized spirituality. As in architecture, where stained glass created a transcendent space, painting employed gold backgrounds to evoke a metaphysical realm rather than a natural setting. This “Gothic light” constituted a fictive illumination that transcended natural appearance.

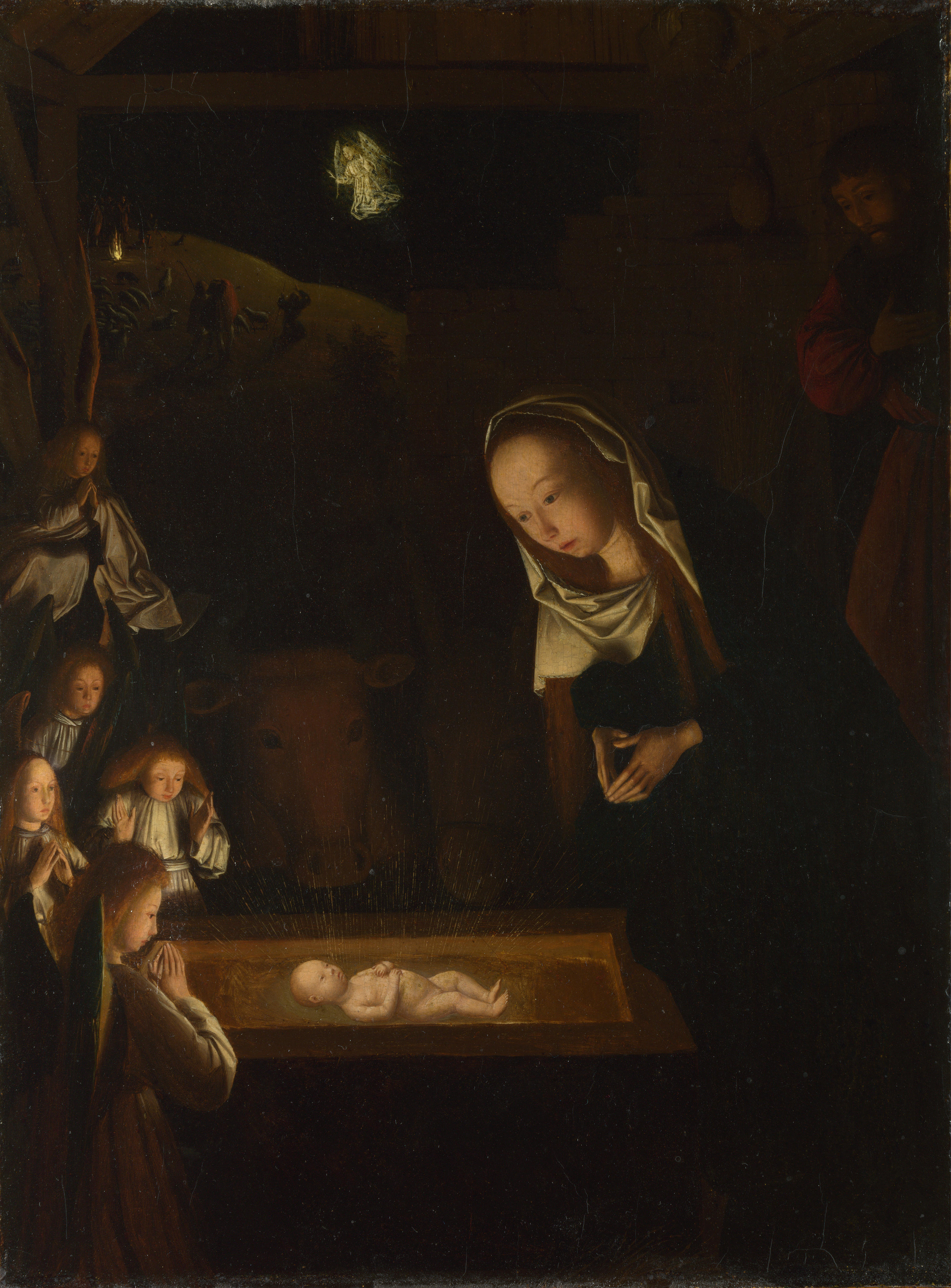
Nativity (1490), by Geertgen tot Sint Jans, The National Gallery, London.

The gold background reinforced the sacred symbolism of light, placing figures in an indeterminate, non-natural space associated with the divine. Figures and objects thus functioned as elements of religious symbolism rather than as components of a realistic setting. Cennino Cennini, in Il libro dell’Arte, systematized the technical procedures for the use of gold leaf in painting—on backgrounds, draperies, and halos—practices that remained in use until the 16th century. Gold was applied extensively, especially in halos and backgrounds, as exemplified by Duccio’s Maestà, whose brilliance was enhanced within the interior of the cathedral of Siena. Gilding techniques included the application of a red clay ground, polishing with smooth tools, and the incision of patterns to increase reflectivity. Early Gothic painting generally excluded shadow, presenting uniformly illuminated scenes; as Hans Jantzen observed, the suppression of shadow elevated sensory light into a supra-sensory one.

Gothic painting shows a gradual evolution in the treatment of light. Franco-Gothic painting emphasized linear drawing and intense chromaticism, privileging the luminosity of flat color over tonal modulation. With the Italic or Trecento Gothic, a more naturalistic approach emerged, marked by an interest in depth, anatomy, and tonal gradation, as seen in the work of Cimabue, Giotto, Duccio, Simone Martini, and Ambrogio Lorenzetti. In Flemish Gothic painting, the development of oil technique enabled brighter colors, subtle gradations, and greater detail, as exemplified by Jan van Eyck, Rogier van der Weyden, Hans Memling, and Gerard David.

Between the 13th and 14th centuries, Italian painting adopted a more naturalistic conception of light. In the frescoes of the Scrovegni Chapel, Giotto used tonal gradations to distinguish surfaces and orientations, becoming the first painter to represent sunlight as a soft illumination that modeled forms and enhanced textures. For his part, Taddeo Gaddi – in his Annunciation to the Shepherds (Baroncelli Chapel, Santa Croce, Florence) – introduced a visible nocturnal light source, using strong chromatic contrasts to convey the rapid falloff of divine light.

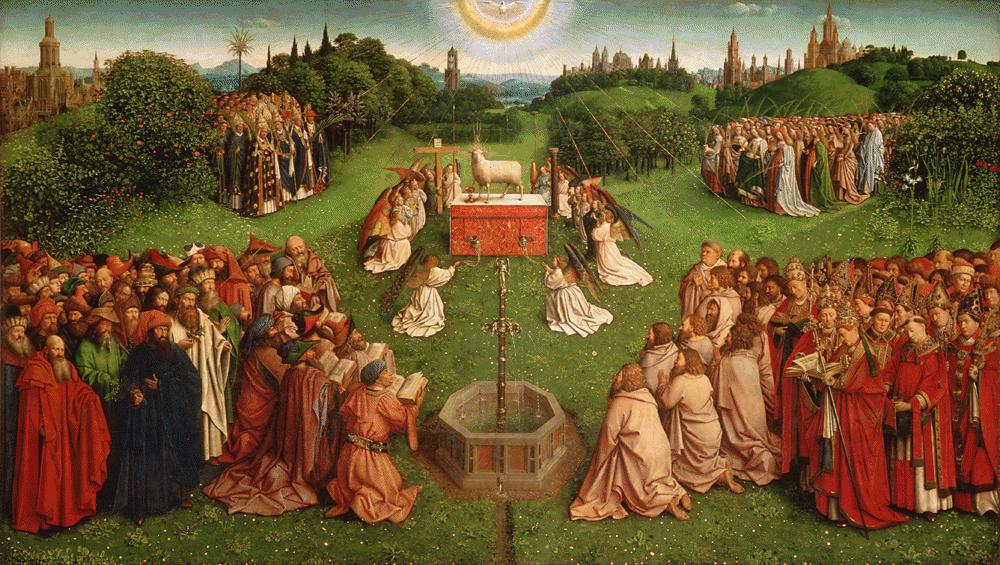
The Adoration of the Mystic Lamb, from the Ghent Polyptych (1432, Saint Bavo's Cathedral, Ghent), by Hubert and Jan van Eyck.

In the Netherlands, Hubert and Jan van Eyck and Robert Campin focused on the interaction of light with diverse surfaces, rendering reflections on metal, glass, and jewels, as in the Mérode Triptych and the Ghent Altarpiece. Hubert van Eyck developed an early sense of atmospheric saturation in the Hours of Turin, anticipating modern landscape painting. In the Adoration of the Mystic Lamb, the landscape dissolves into a luminous background of exceptional subtlety.

Jan van Eyck further refined these experiments, achieving a naturalistic atmospheric light in works such as The Virgin of Chancellor Rolin and The Arnolfini Portrait, where natural and symbolic light sources coexist. In his workshop, oil painting with layered glazes was perfected, enhancing luminosity, depth, and chromatic richness.

Other Netherlandish painters, including Dirk Bouts, Petrus Christus, and Geertgen tot Sint Jans, also explored expressive and symbolic uses of light, notably in Geertgen’s Nativity, where light emanates from the Christ Child as a sign of divine grace.

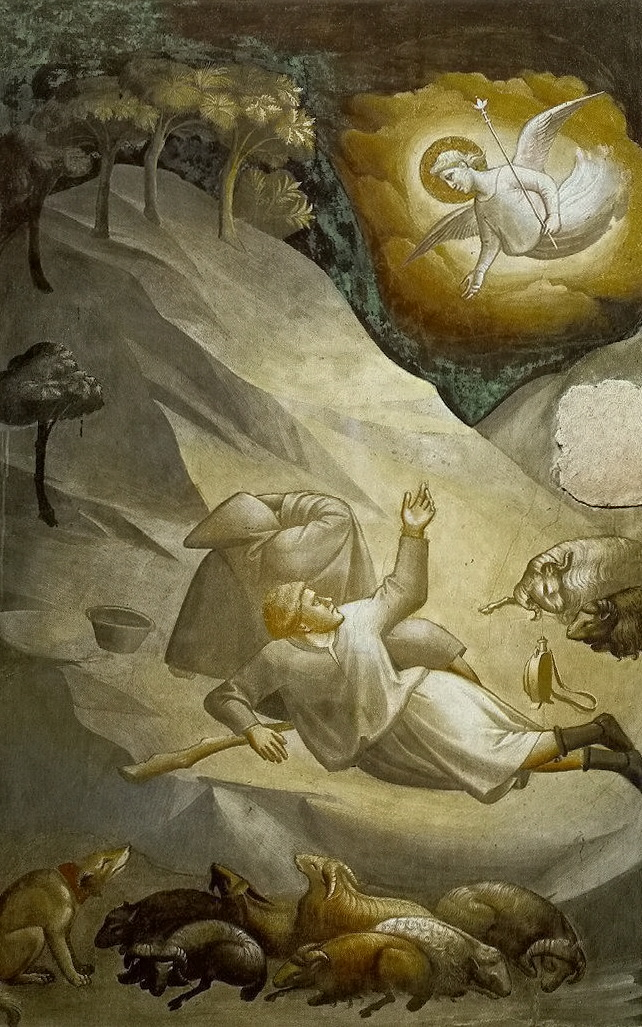
The Annunciation to the Shepherds (1328–30), by Taddeo Gaddi, Baroncelli Chapel, Santa Croce, Florence.

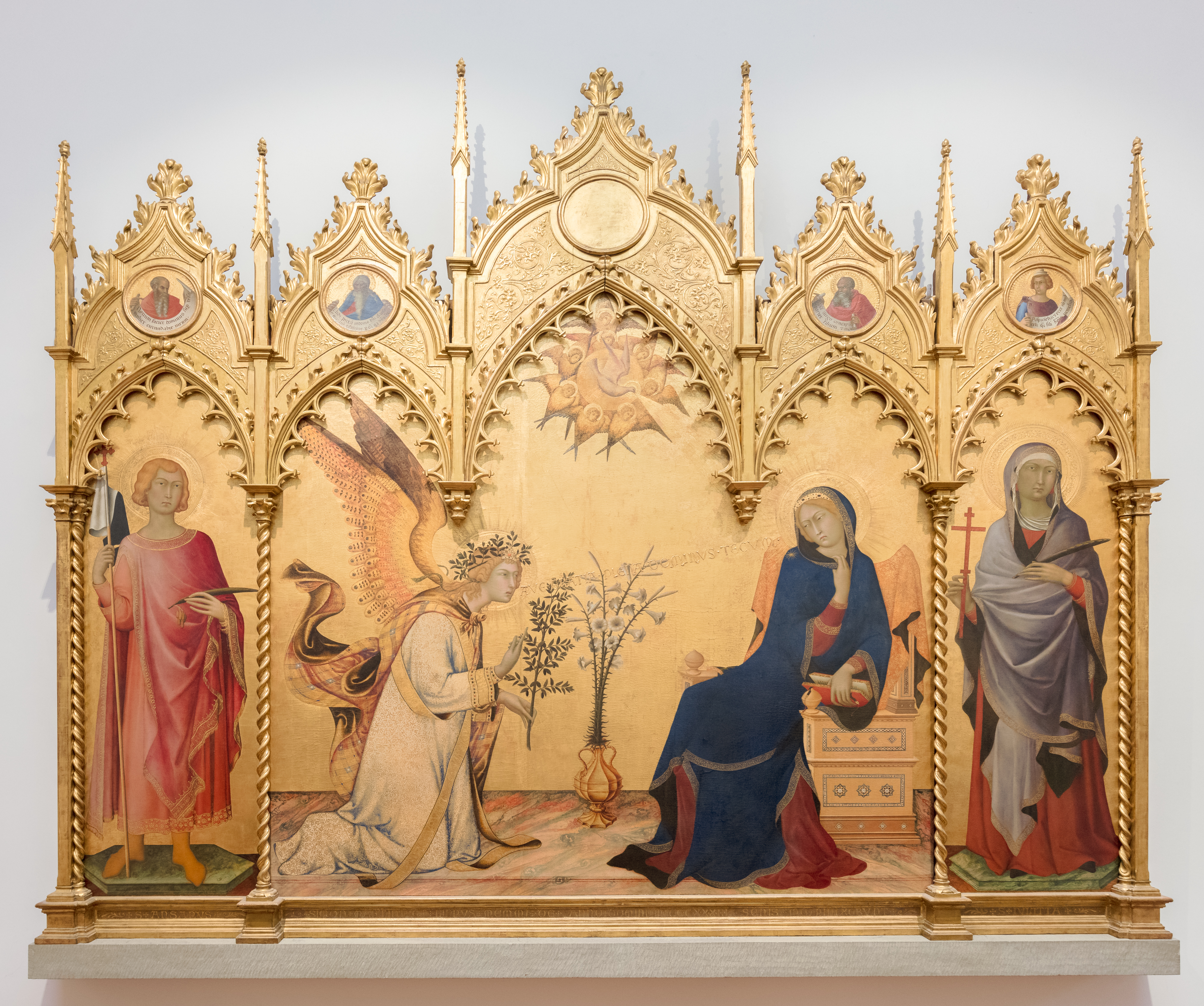
Annunciation between Saints Ansano and Margherita (1333), by Simone Martini, Uffizi Gallery, Florence.

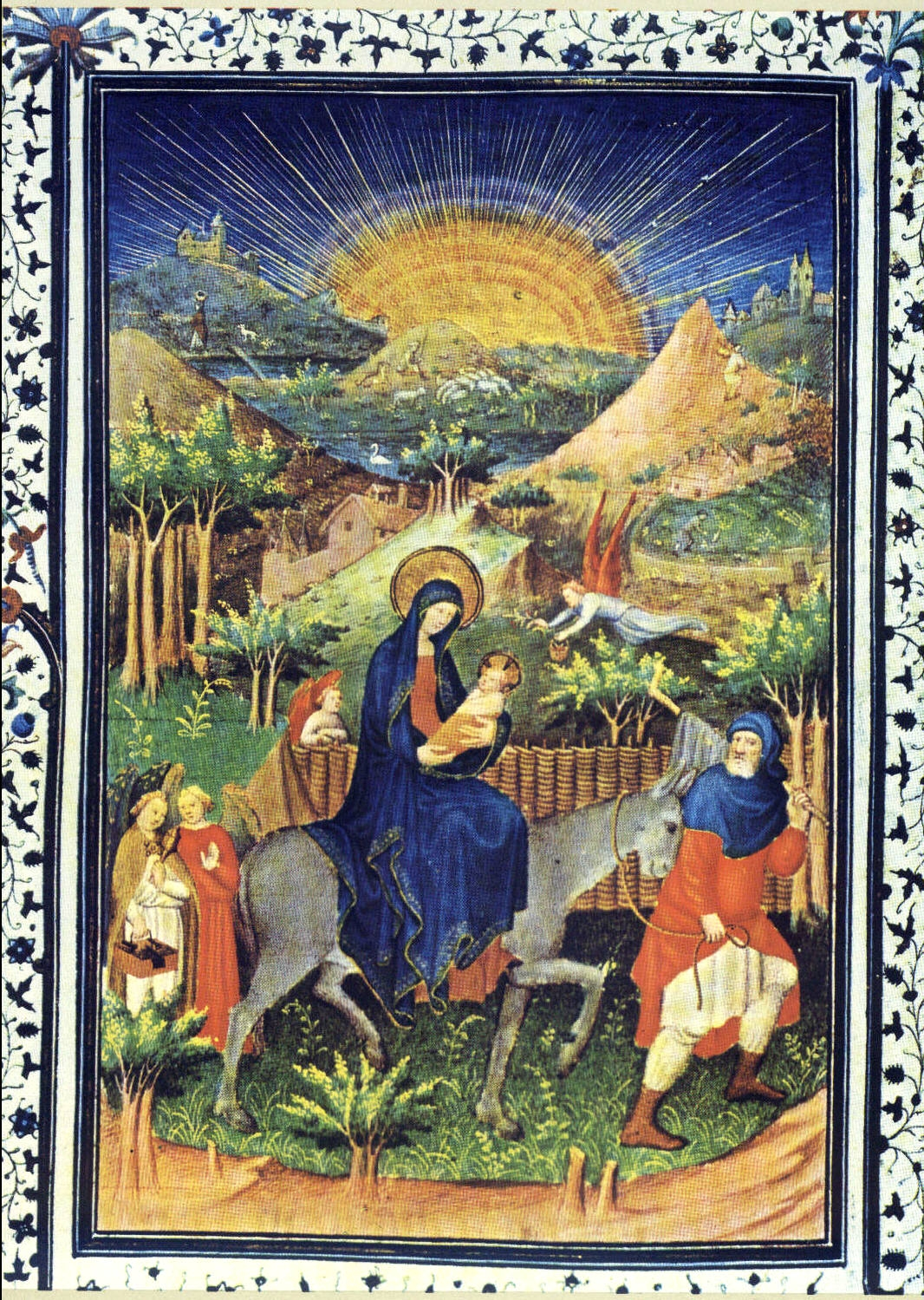
The Flight into Egypt (c. 1405–1408), Marshal Boucicaut's Book of Hours, Musée Jacquemart-André, Paris.

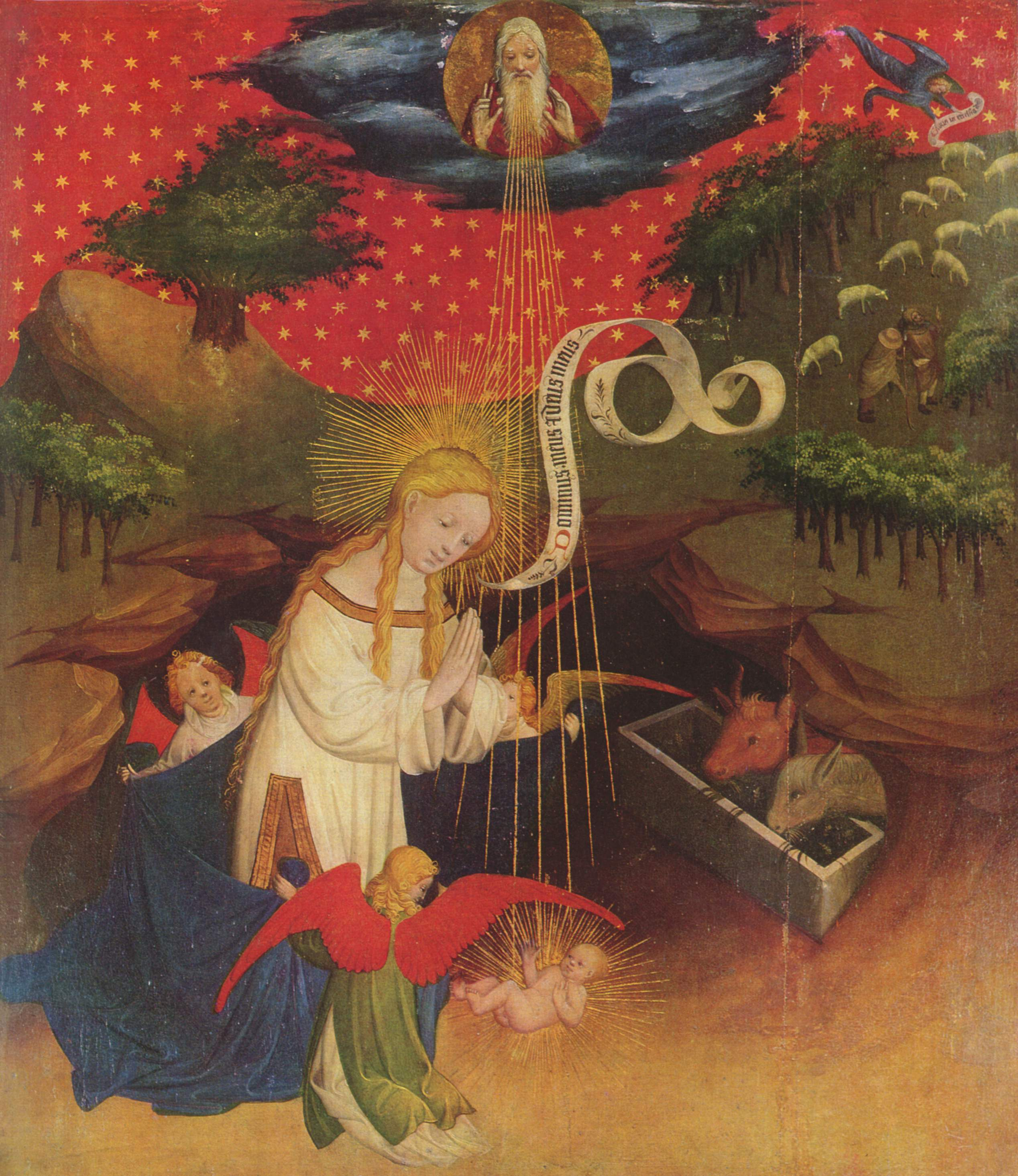
Nativity (1424), by Master Francke, Kunsthalle Hamburg.

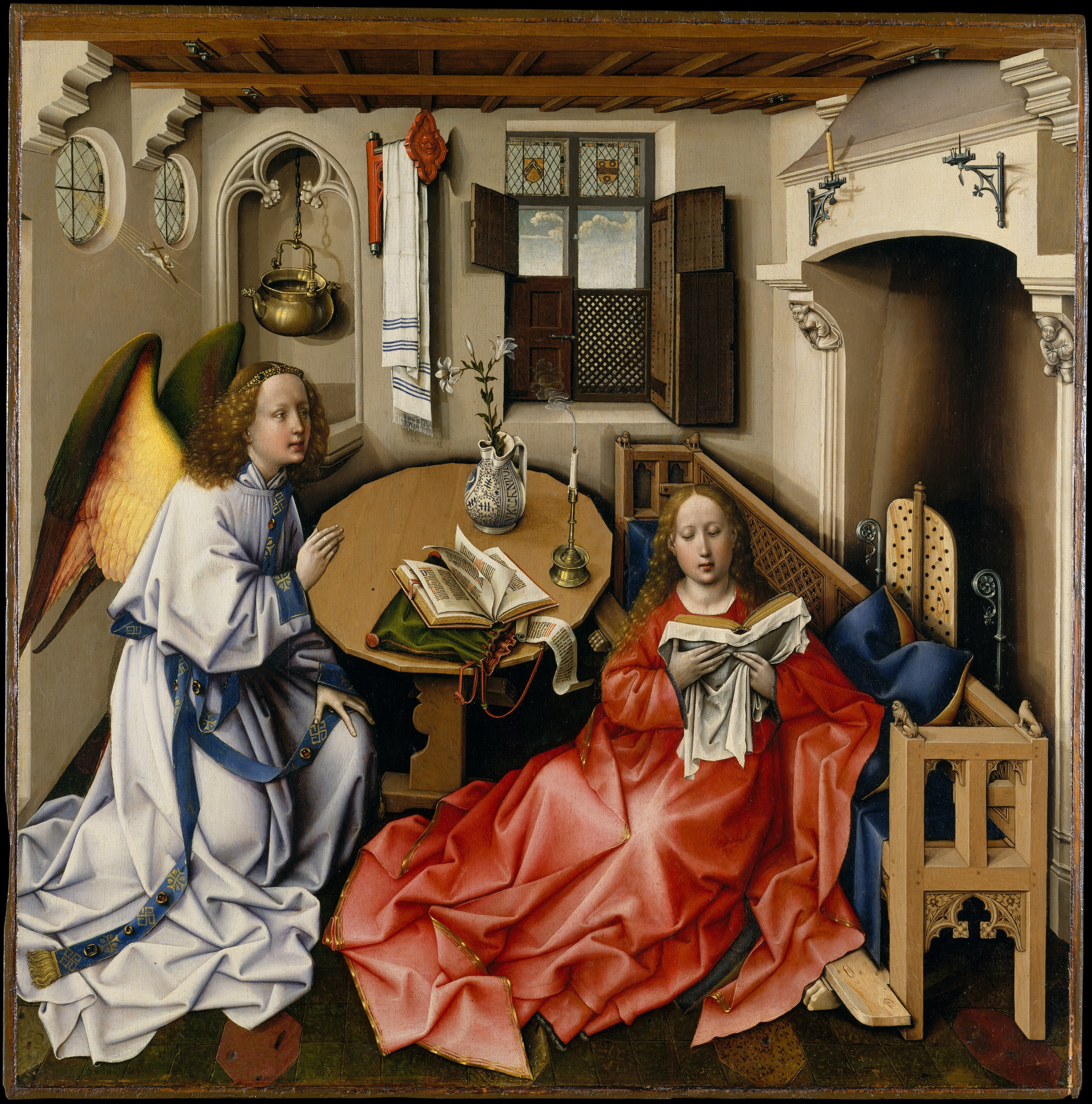
Central panel of the Mérode Triptych (1425-1428), by Robert Campin, Metropolitan Museum of Art, New York.

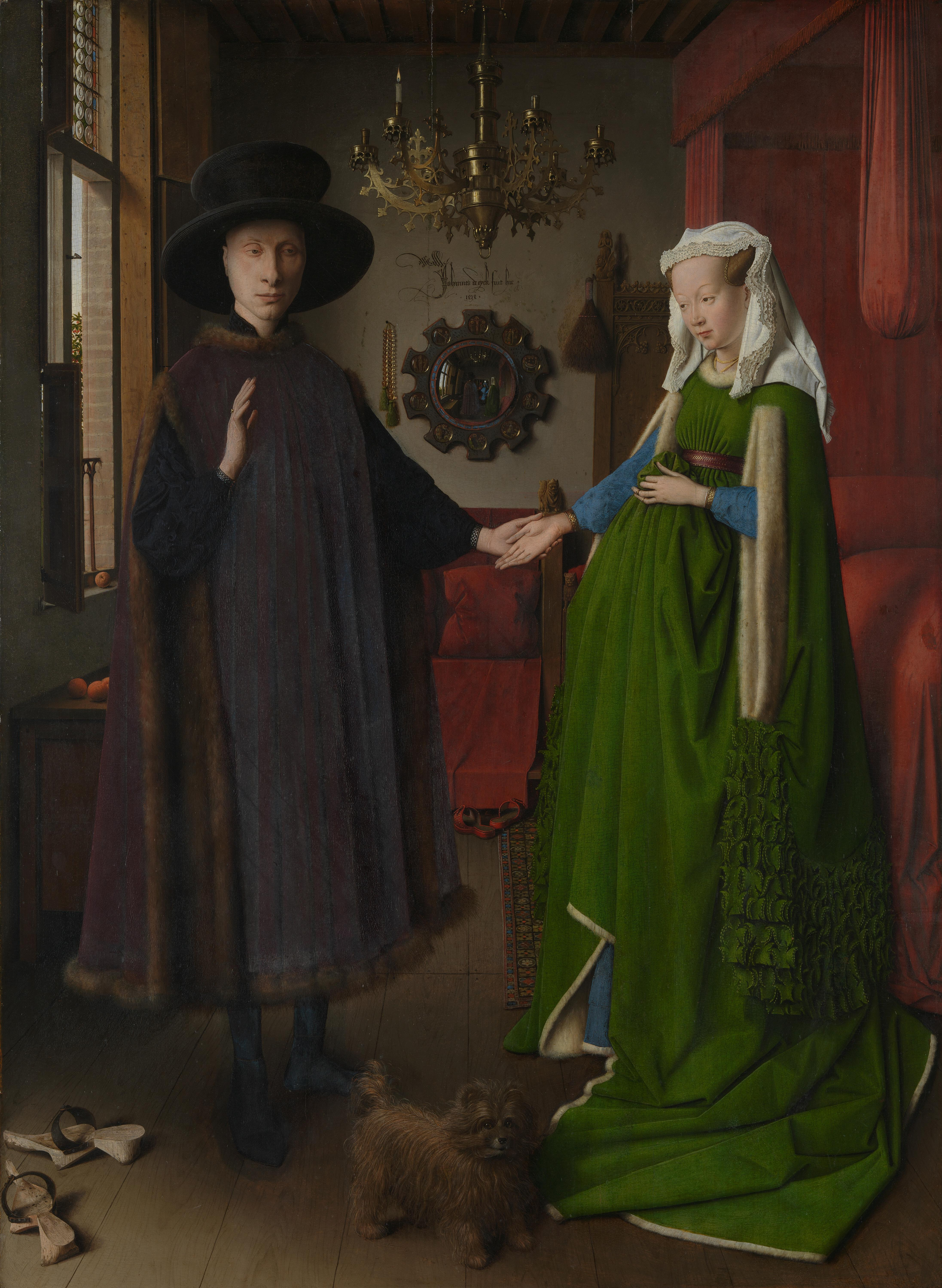
The Arnolfini Marriage (1434), by Jan van Eyck, The National Gallery, London.

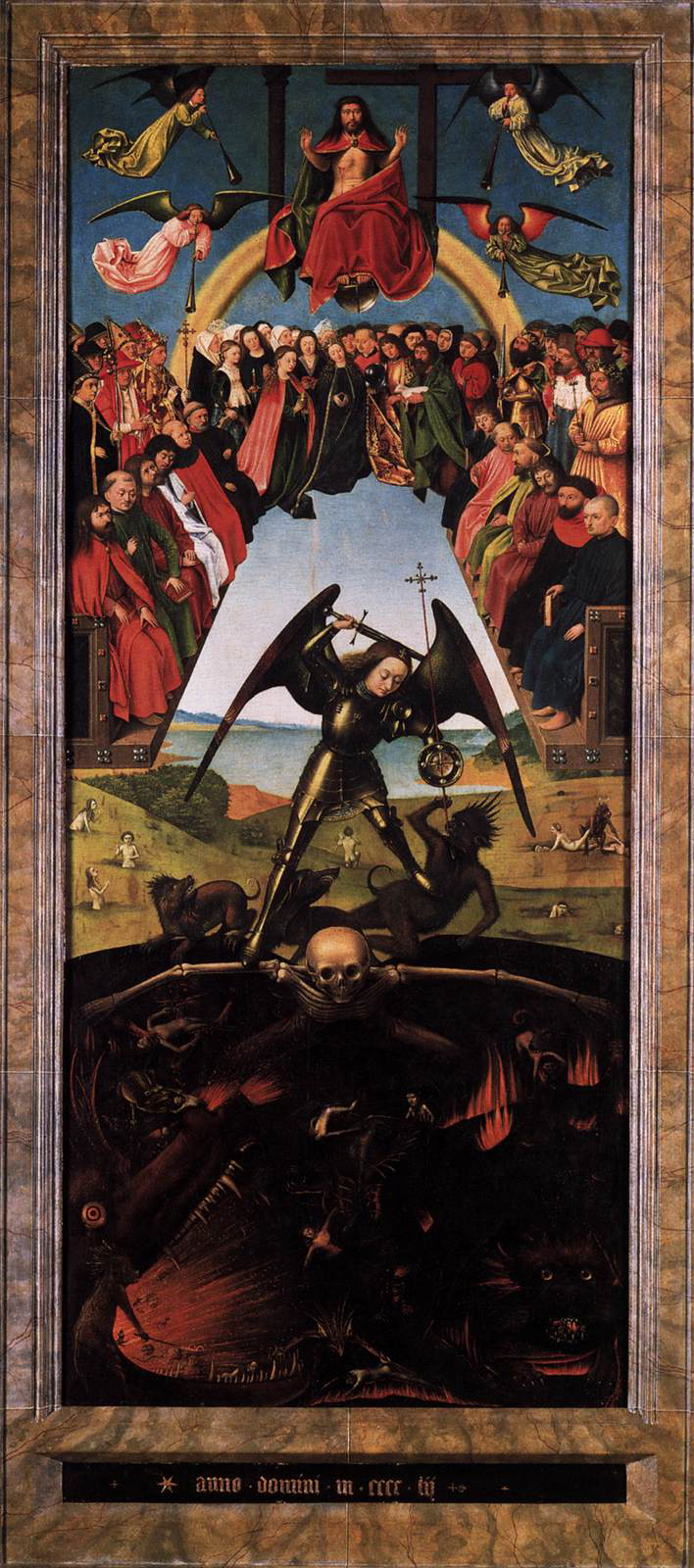
The Last Judgment (1452), by Petrus Christus, Staatliche Museen, Berlin.

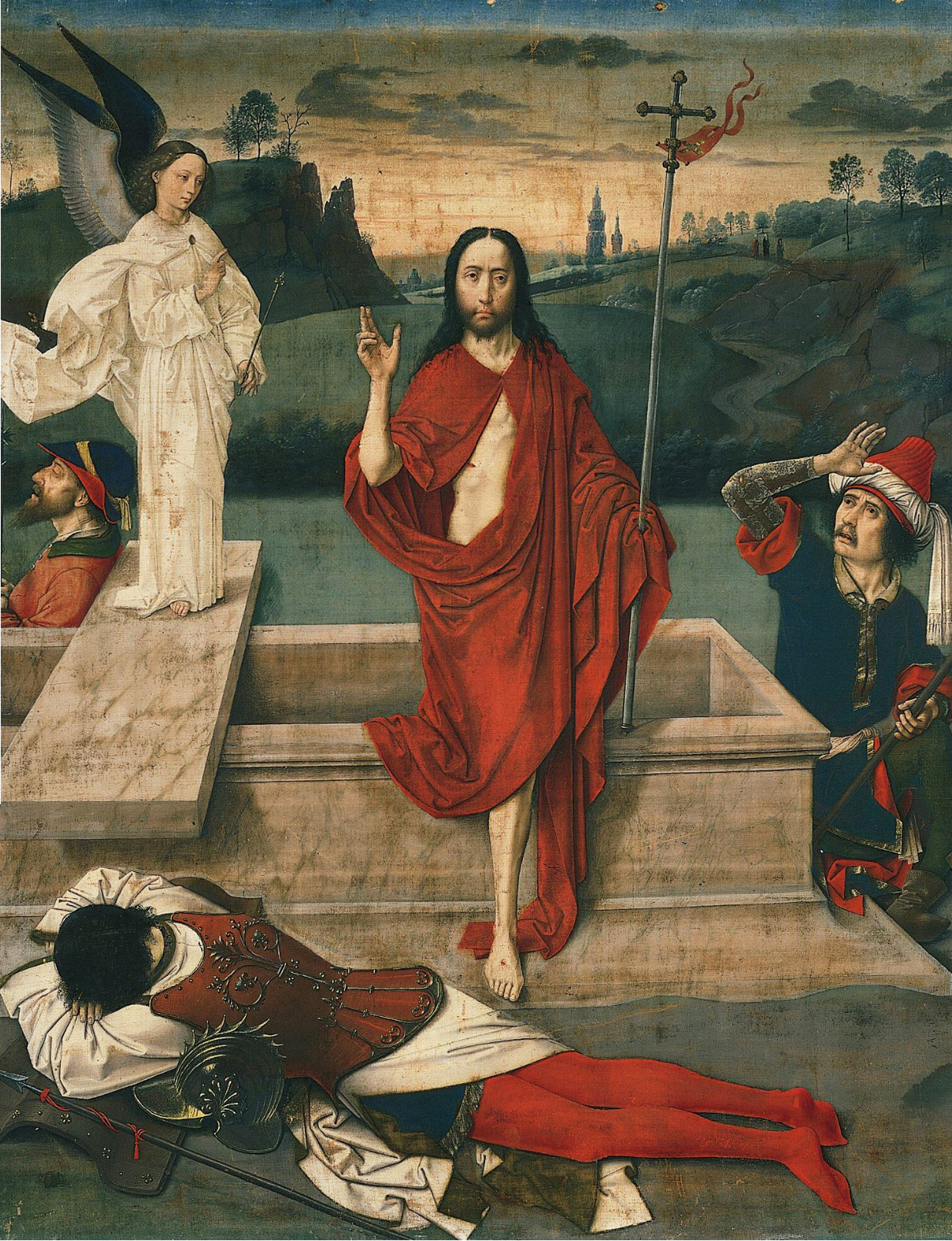
The Resurrection (1455), by Dirk Bouts, Norton Simon Museum, Pasadena (California).

=== Modern Age Art ===
==== Renaissance ====
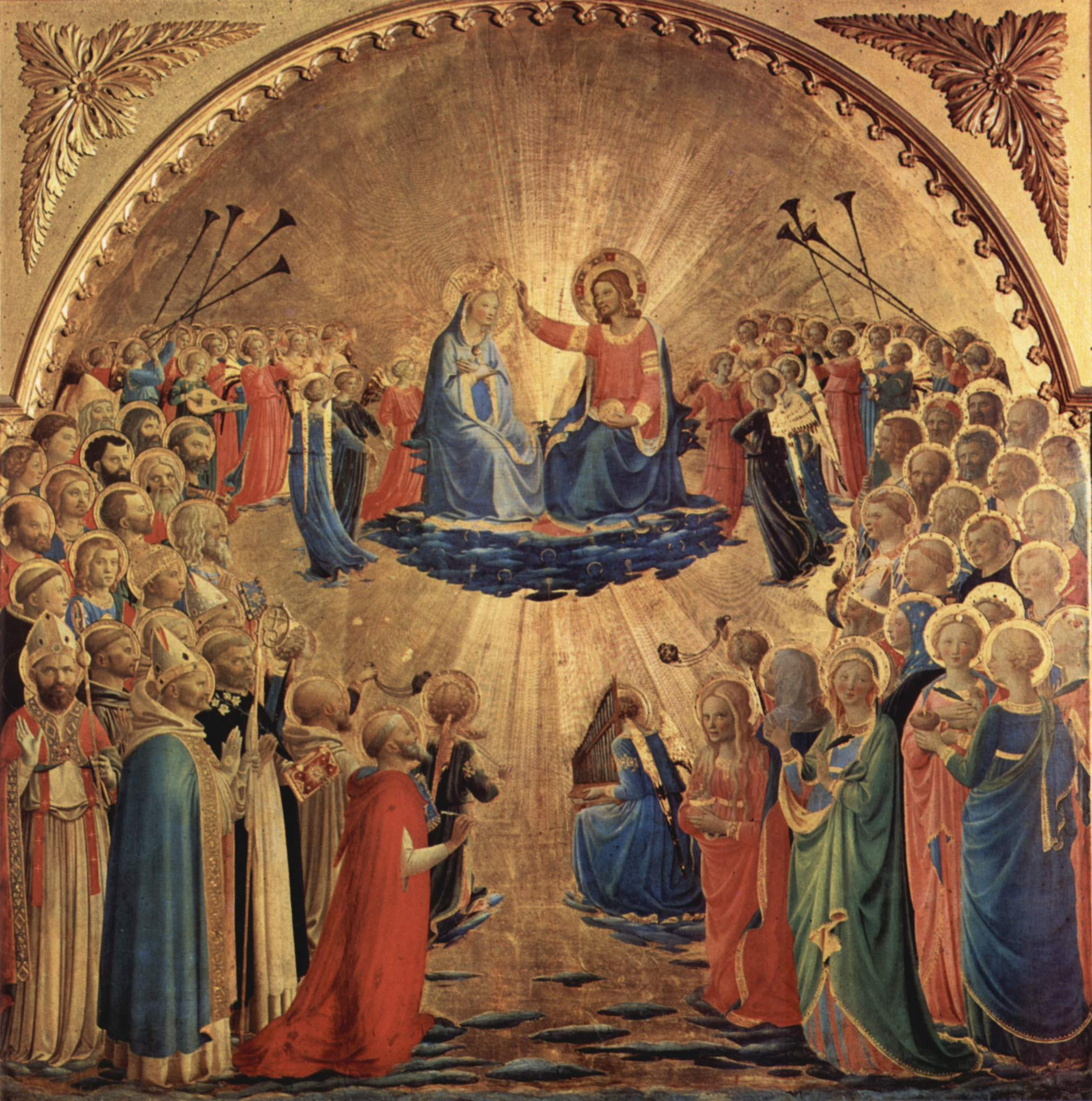
Coronation of the Virgin (1435), by Fra Angelico, Uffizi Gallery, Florence.

The art of the Modern Age—distinct from modern or contemporary art—began with the Renaissance, which emerged in Italy in the 15th century. Rooted in classical Greco-Roman models and inspired by nature, Renaissance art emphasized harmony, proportion, and rational order. Linear perspective became a fundamental compositional system, and light was treated more naturalistically through empirical observation of physical reality. Renaissance culture marked a return to rationalism, the study of nature, and classical philosophy, with humanism placing the human being at the center of intellectual inquiry.

During the Renaissance, canvas and oil painting became widespread, particularly in Venice after 1460. Oil technique allowed greater chromatic richness and more nuanced rendering of light and brightness. Typically, light was strongest in the foreground and diminished toward the background, producing a fixed and idealized illumination. Over time, this abstract space was transformed into a more realistic atmosphere through the gradual subordination of form to lighting effects and the dissolution of rigid volumes in luminous space.

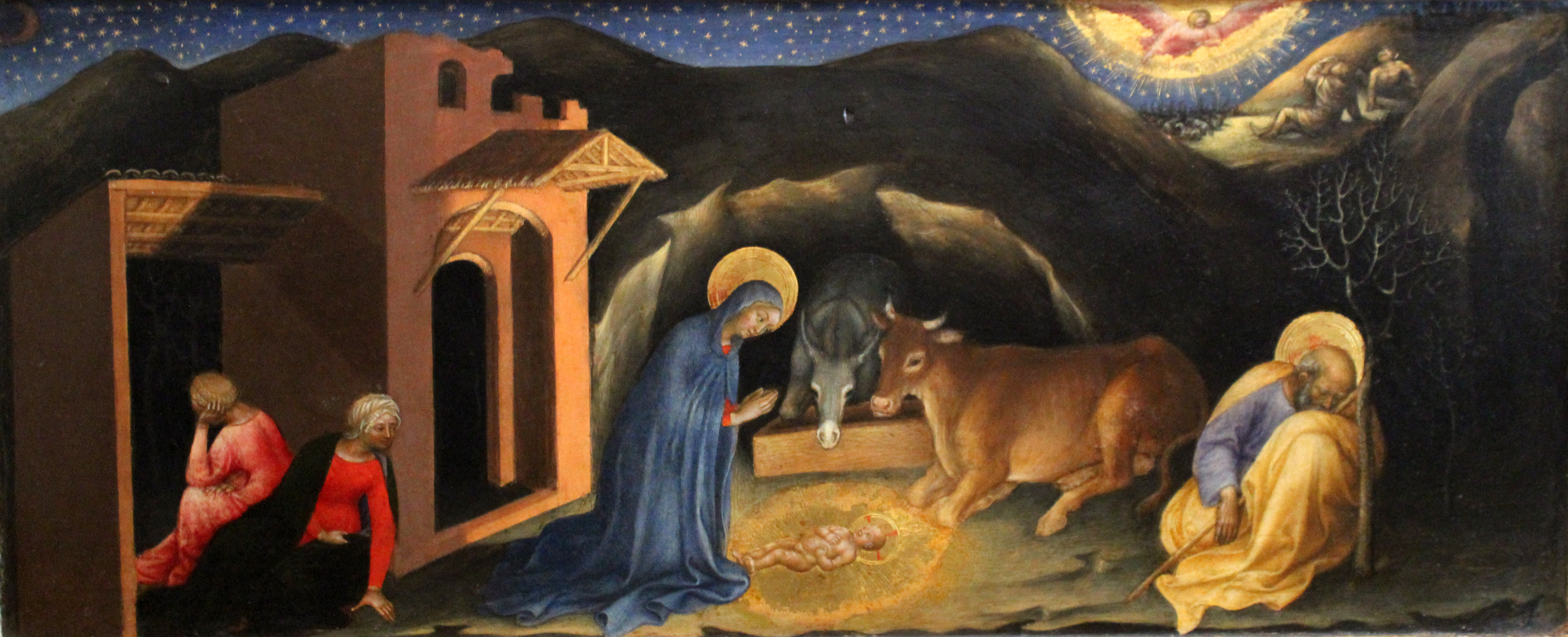
Nativity, predella of the Adoration of the Magi (1423), by Gentile da Fabriano, Uffizi Gallery, Florence.

Chiaroscuro was revived to give relief to forms, and artists deepened their study of tonal gradation to modulate light and shadow. Light no longer functioned primarily as a metaphor, as in Gothic art, but as a means of measuring and organizing reality. It defined pictorial space and modeled volumes through naturalistic effects. Even in religious subjects, symbolic light was subordinated to realistic composition.

The Renaissance also produced the first theoretical treatises on light in painting. Leonardo da Vinci devoted extensive sections of his Treatise on Painting to the scientific study of light. Albrecht Dürer examined the geometric determination of shadows cast by point light sources. Giovanni Paolo Lomazzo, in his Trattato (1584), classified light hierarchically, from sunlight and divine light to artificial and reflected light. Cennino Cennini reiterated Philoponus’ rule on distance through tonal contrast, stating that distant forms should appear darker and nearer ones lighter.

Leon Battista Alberti provided a foundational theoretical framework in De pictura (1435), emphasizing the interdependence of light and color and identifying three core elements of painting: circumscriptio (drawing), compositio (composition), and luminum receptio (illumination). He defined color as a quality of light and asserted that relief is achieved through light and shadow. Alberti also highlighted the role of white in creating brilliance and noted that darker tonal grounds enhance the visibility of light effects.

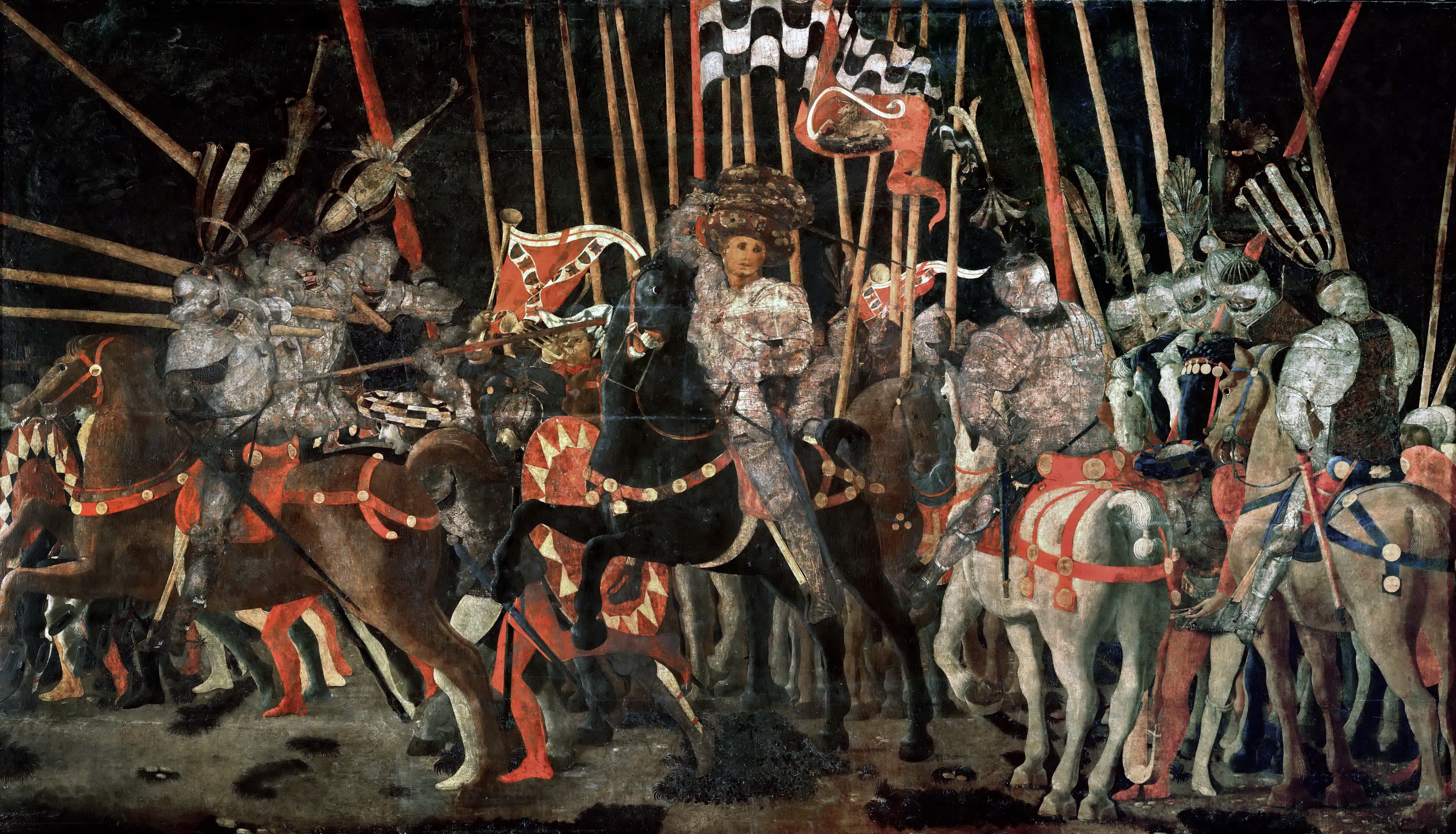
The Battle of San Romano (1456), by Paolo Uccello, Musée du Louvre, Paris.

Alberti’s theories strongly influenced Florentine painting in the mid-15th century, giving rise to a tendency sometimes referred to as pittura di luce (“painting of light”). Its principal representatives include Domenico Veneziano, Fra Angelico, Paolo Uccello, Andrea del Castagno and the early works of Piero della Francesca.

Domenico Veneziano, originally from Venice but active in Florence, introduced a style that emphasized color over line. In The Virgin and Child with Saints (c. 1445, Uffizi), he combined new spatial and lighting techniques to achieve a convincing naturalism. Solid forms are defined through light–shadow modeling, while a clear, serene sunlight fills the architectural setting, creating a luminous and tranquil atmosphere characteristic of his work.

Fra Angelico fused the symbolic light of medieval spirituality with the scientific naturalism of the Renaissance. His paintings feature a diffuse, non-contrasting light, differentiated by time of day, which conveys calm and spiritual harmony. In Scenes from the Life of Saint Nicholas (1437, Vatican Pinacoteca), he applied Alberti’s principle of balancing illuminated and shaded areas, notably in figures seen from behind and in landscape elements.

Paolo Uccello was also innovative in his treatment of light. In works such as The Battle of San Romano (1456, Louvre), objects are individually lit, their volume defined by both illumination and geometric structure. These elements are arranged in a highly constructed, almost theatrical space, characterized by an artificial and scenographic light.

The Birth of Venus (1485), by Sandro Botticelli, Uffizi Gallery, Florence.

Piero della Francesca made light the primary means of spatial definition. In The Baptism of Christ (1440–1445, National Gallery, London), figures are reduced to clear geometric forms articulated by uniform illumination. As Giulio Carlo Argan noted, Piero sought not the transmission but the fixation of light, turning it into a stable measure of space. His theoretical studies of perspective and optics (De prospectiva pingendi) informed a style marked by luminous clarity and symbolic restraint, evident in the frescoes of San Francesco in Arezzo. He was also among the first Renaissance painters to depict night scenes, such as The Dream of Constantine, and he successfully combined Flemish luminism with Florentine spatial rigor.

Sandro Botticelli, by contrast, moved away from naturalism toward a symbolic conception of light. In The Birth of Venus (1483–1485, Uffizi), light and darkness express a Neoplatonic opposition between spirit and matter. Venus occupies the center, mediating between day and night, sea and land, and the divine and the human.

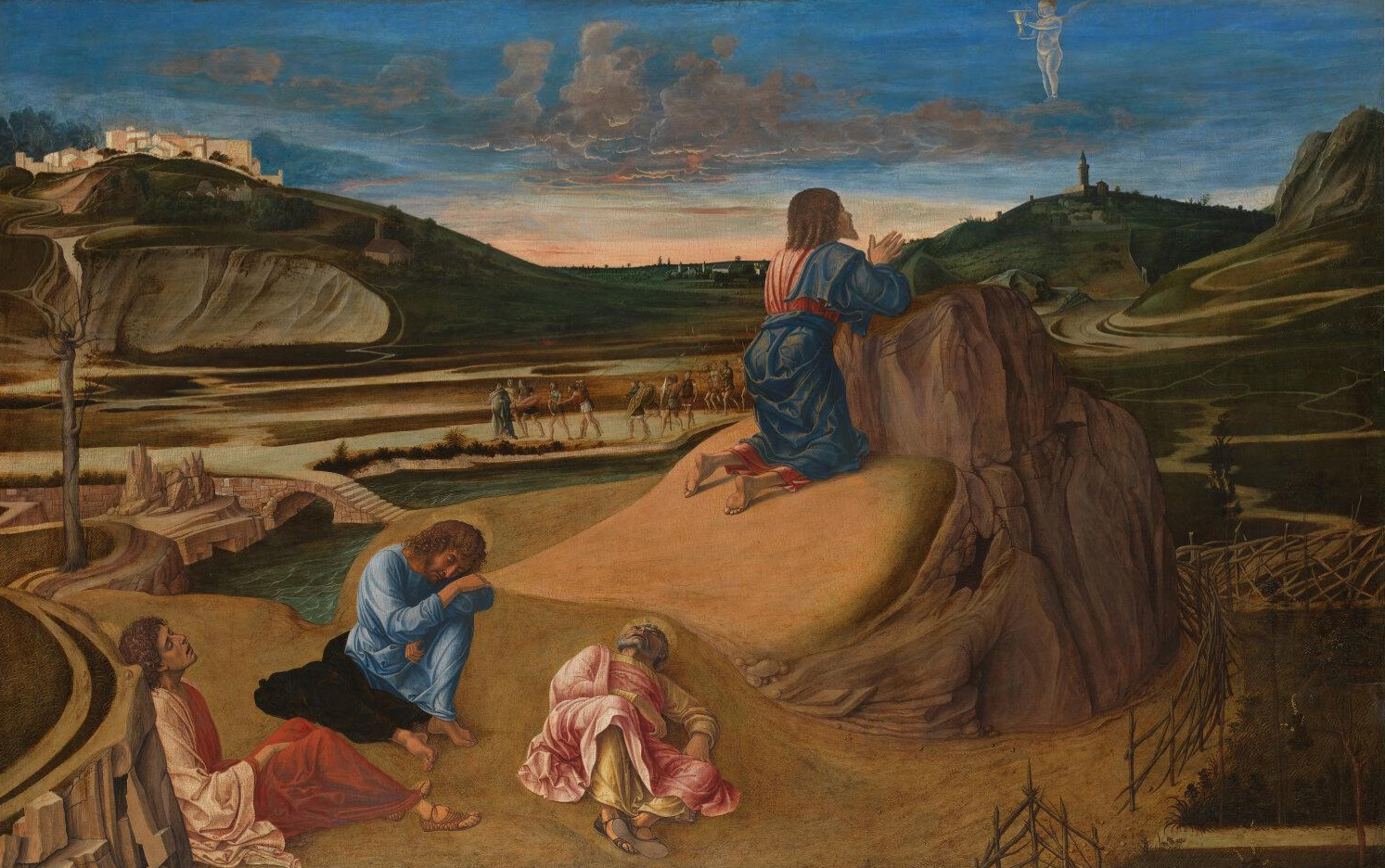
Christ on the Mount of Olives (1459), by Giovanni Bellini, The National Gallery, London.

A major pictorial school emerged in Venice, characterized by the use of canvas and oil painting and by the central role of light in structuring form, together with a strong emphasis on color. Chromatic richness became its defining feature, anticipating later developments in 16th-century painting. Its principal representatives were Carlo Crivelli, Antonello da Messina, and Giovanni Bellini. In the San Giobbe Altarpiece (c. 1485, Gallerie dell’Accademia, Venice), Bellini combined Florentine linear perspective with Venetian color, uniting spatial construction and atmospheric light through the Flemish oil technique and establishing a new pictorial language. Kenneth Clark noted that Bellini possessed an exceptional emotional sensitivity to light". n Christ on the Mount of Olives (1459, National Gallery, London), light becomes the compositional focus, with the rising sun illuminating a shadowed valley. Similar expressive effects appear in the Resurrection (1475–1479, Staatliche Museen, Berlin), where Christ radiates light over the sleeping soldiers. While early works favor dawn and dusk, Bellini later preferred full daylight, in which forms merge with atmosphere, though he also exploited cold winter light, as in the Virgin of the Meadow (1505, National Gallery, London).

La Gioconda (Mona Lisa), 1503–1519, by Leonardo da Vinci, Musée du Louvre, Paris.

The Renaissance also saw the development of sfumato, traditionally associated with Leonardo da Vinci. This technique blurred contours through gradual tonal transitions, producing a sense of distance and atmospheric depth. Achieved through successive glazes and soft modulation of shadows, sfumato eliminated visible brushwork and approximated the effects of human vision in open space. Also known as aerial perspective, it was used by artists such as Dürer, Giorgione and Bernardino Luini, and later by Velázquez and other Baroque painters.

Leonardo’s approach to painting centered on perception and the observation of nature. In his Treatise on Painting, he defined painting as the interplay of light and darkness (chiaroscuro), which generates movement and life. He described painting as a composition of light, shadow, and color, distinguishing between illumination (lume) and brilliance (lustro), and noting that rough, opaque surfaces do not produce luster. For Leonardo, light structured space, volume, and color, while shadows modulated form; he distinguished shadow (ombra) from darkness (tenebre), understanding the former as a transition between light and dark.

Leonardo also studied nocturnal illumination, the gradation of light according to distance from its source, and the optimal lighting of the painter’s studio. His subtle chiaroscuro is especially evident in his portraits, where soft shadows envelop faces in an ambiguous atmosphere. He emphasized intermediate tones as essential to perception and observed that colors gain or lose beauty depending on their degree of illumination.

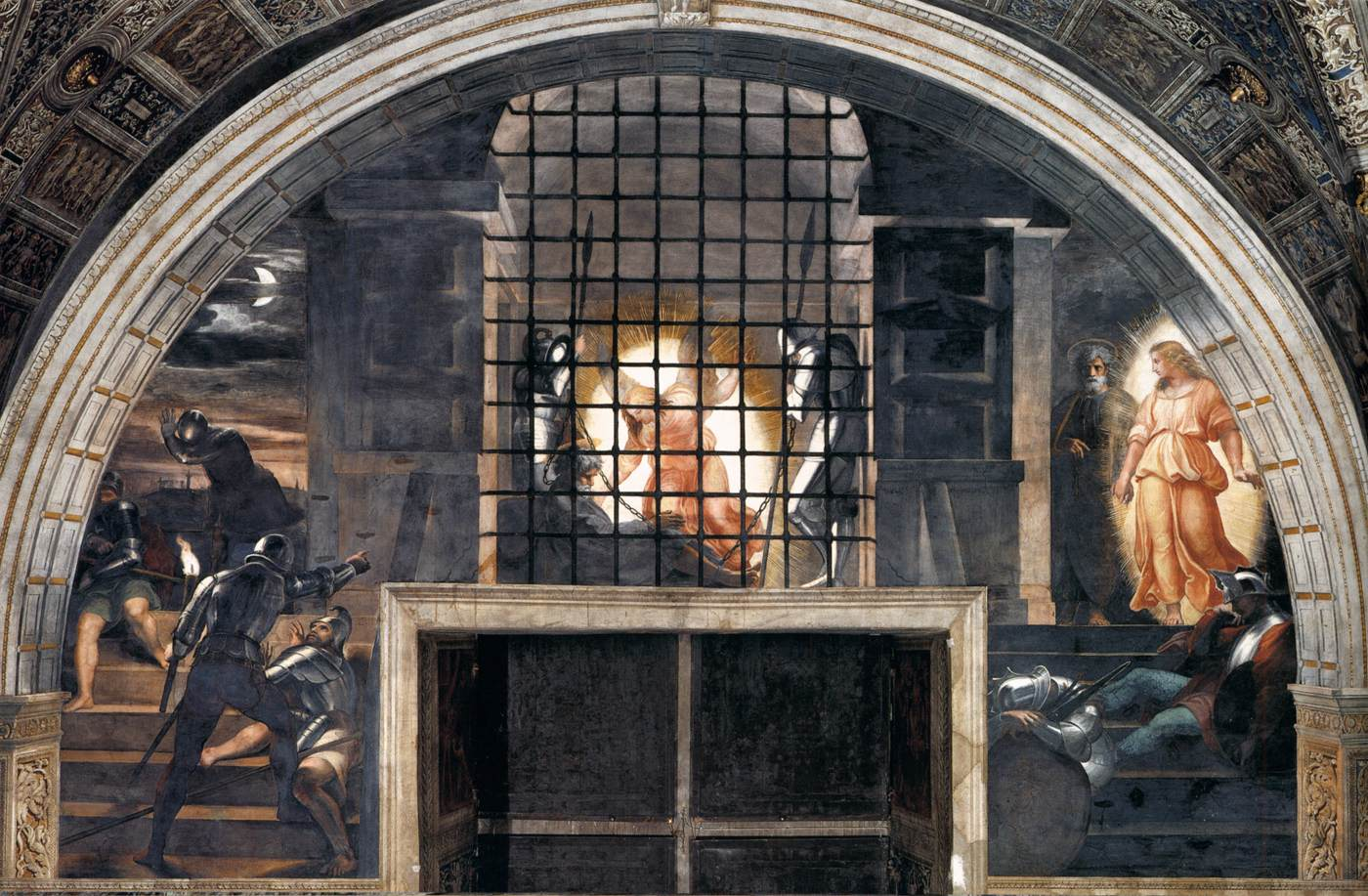
Liberation of Saint Peter (1514), by Raphael, Vatican Museums, Vatican City.

The other major figure of the early Cinquecento was Raphael, a painter of serene balance and idealized harmony, achieved through a highly refined and realistic technique. Giovanni Paolo Lomazzo praised the sweetness and clarity of his light, which endowed his figures with beauty, grace, and convincing relief. Raphael introduced innovative lighting solutions that mediate between Leonardo’s subtle chiaroscuro and the dramatic contrasts later developed by Caravaggio. In The Transfiguration (1517–1520, Vatican Museums), he divided the composition into a celestial and a terrestrial zone, each governed by distinct lighting effects. In The Liberation of Saint Peter (1514, Vatican Museums), he depicted a nocturnal scene illuminated by the radiant light of an angel, which defines depth, reflects on the soldiers’ armor, and influences the surrounding space. This work is often regarded as an early example of naturalistic artificial lighting in painting.

Outside Italy, Albrecht Dürer showed a refined sensitivity to light in his watercolor landscapes, rendered with meticulous detail and poetic nuance that anticipates later Romantic sensibilities. Albrecht Altdorfer explored dramatic and supernatural illumination in The Battle of Alexander at Issos (1529, Alte Pinakothek, Munich), where the sun breaking through clouds generates spectacular luminous effects. Matthias Grünewald, by contrast, developed an intense and expressive treatment of light rooted in medieval mysticism. In the Isenheim Altarpiece (1512–1516, Unterlinden Museum, Colmar), the radiant halo surrounding the Risen Christ exemplifies his emotive use of luminosity.

Bridging Gothic and Renaissance traditions, Hieronymus Bosch produced a singular body of work marked by imaginative and symbolic uses of light. His landscapes display varied atmospheric conditions, while his infernal scenes feature flames, fires, and supernatural illuminations of striking originality. Such effects are prominent in works including The Last Judgment, The Garden of Earthly Delights, and The Temptations of Saint Anthony. Bosch’s fascination with firelight influenced later artists, as seen in works associated with the circle of Lucas van Leyden and in paintings by Joachim Patinir, such as Charon Crossing the Styx. These fiery and fantastical lighting effects also left their mark on Giorgione and on Mannerist painters including Lorenzo Lotto, Dosso Dossi and Domenico Beccafumi.

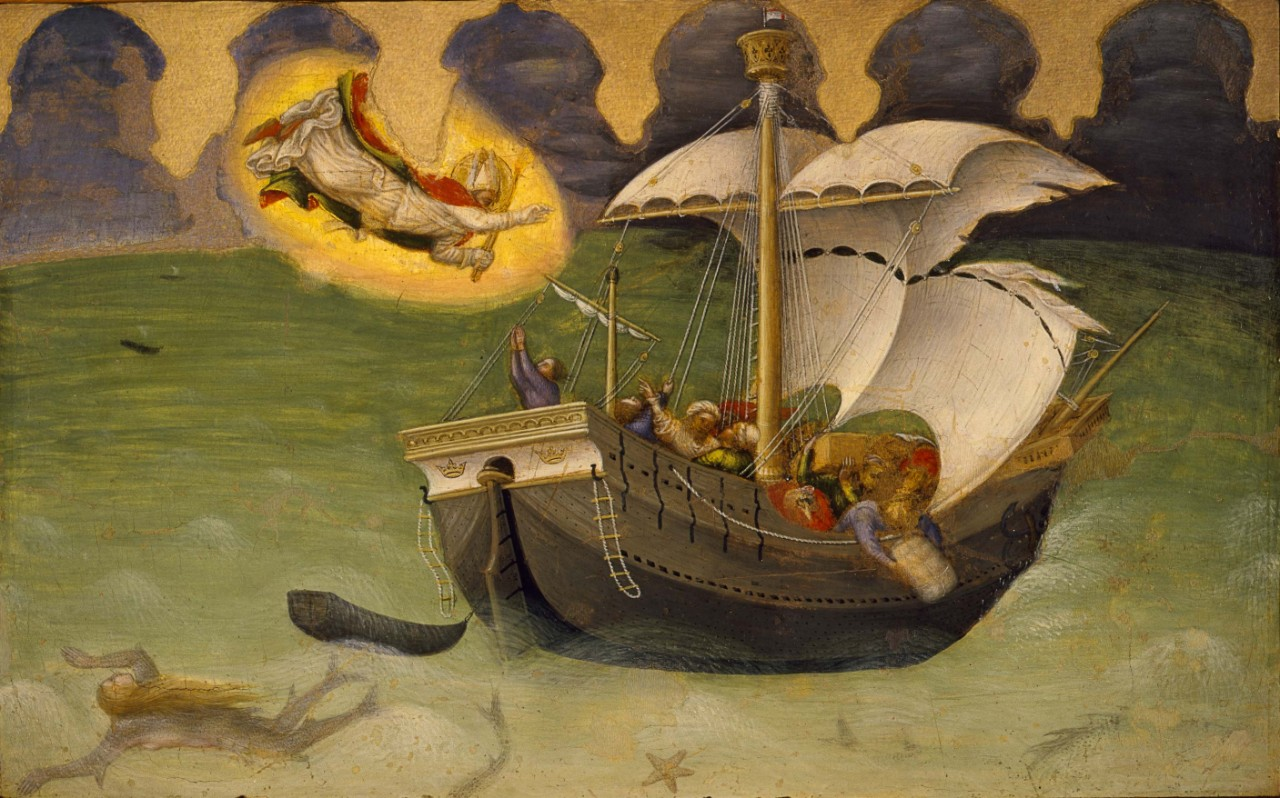
St. Nicholas Saves a Ship from a Storm (1425), by Gentile da Fabriano, Pinacoteca Vaticana, Vatican City.

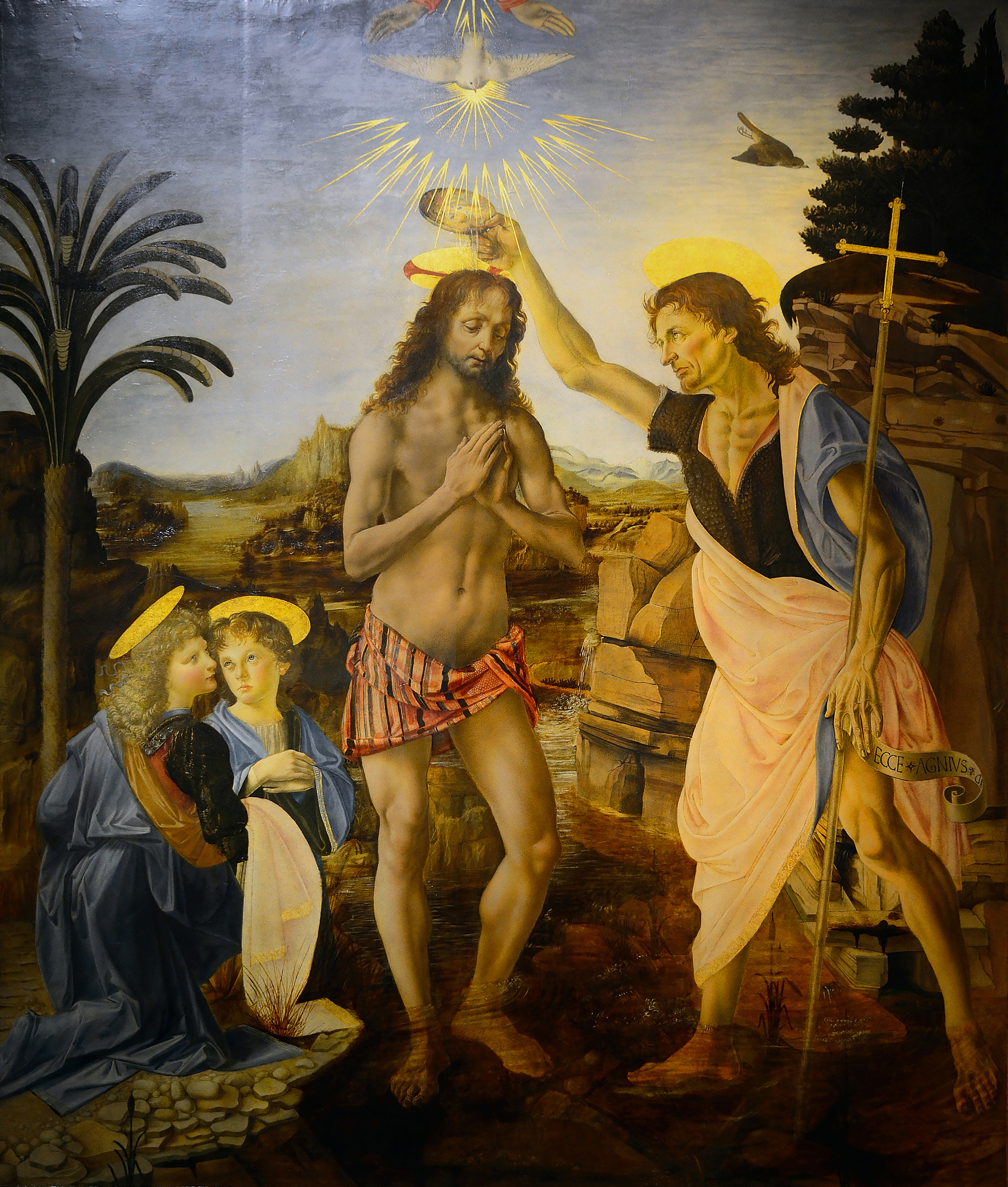
Baptism of Christ (1472-1475), by Andrea del Verrocchio, Uffizi Gallery, Florence.

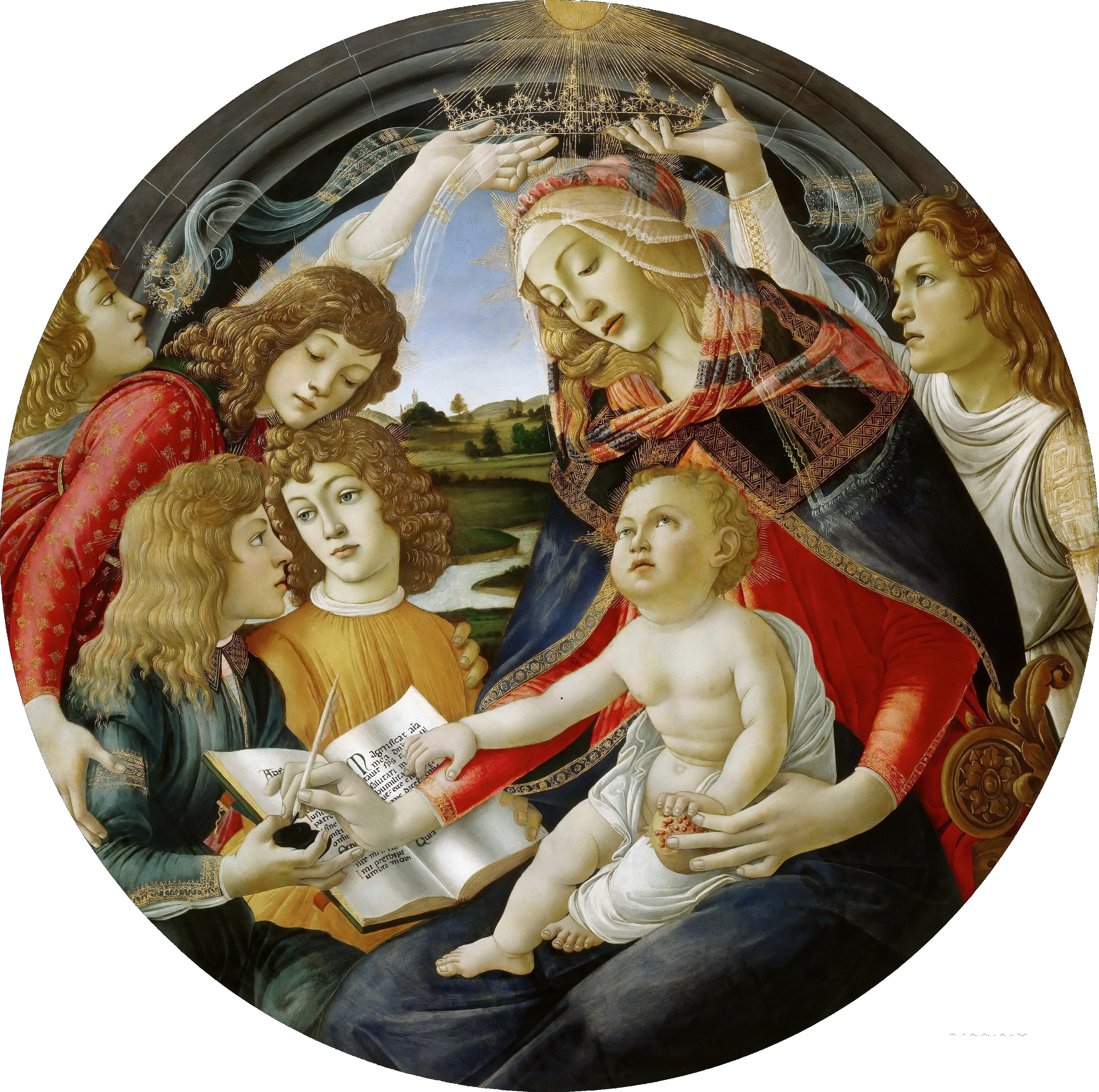
Madonna of the Magnificat (1483), by Sandro Botticelli, Uffizi, Florence.

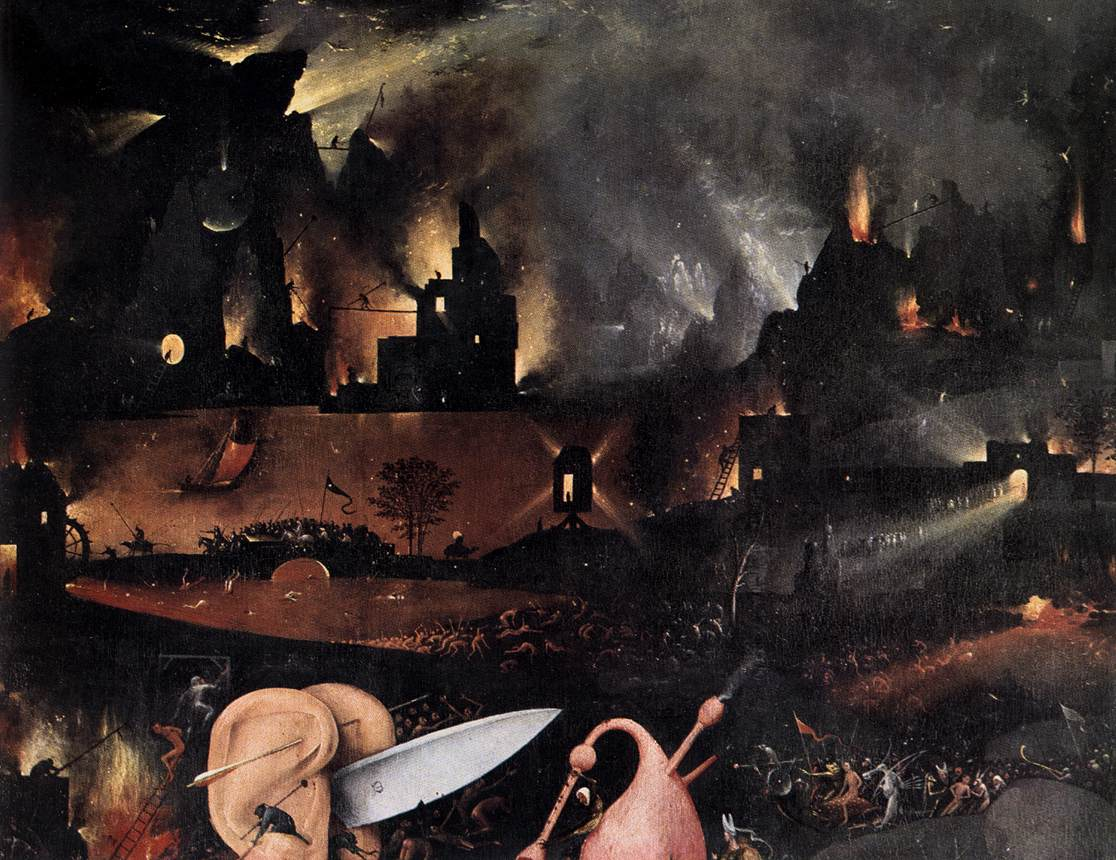
Detail of the right panel (The Inferno) from The Garden of Earthly Delights (c. 1500–1505), by Bosch, Museo del Prado, Madrid.

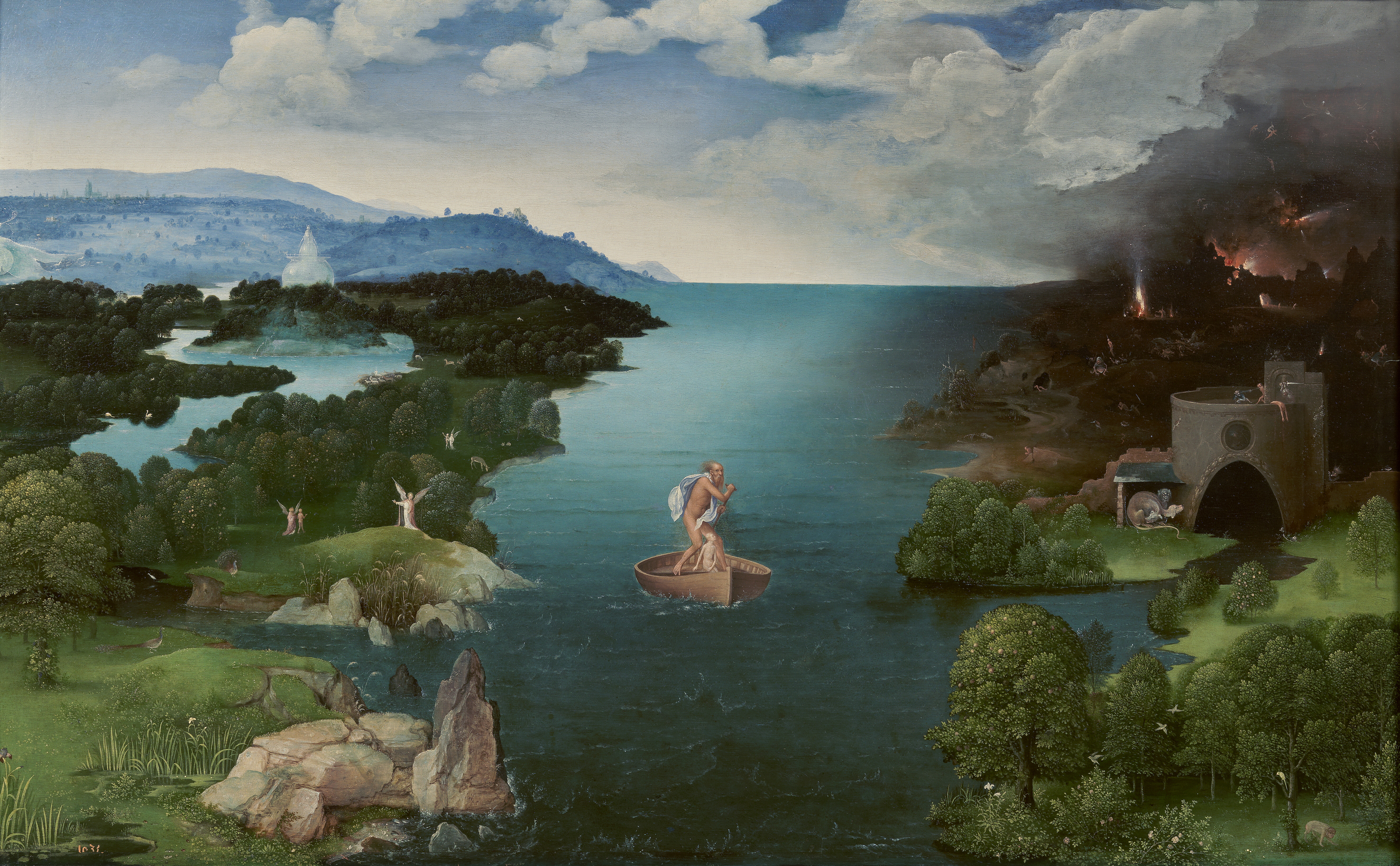
Charon Crossing the Styx Lagoon (c. 1520–1524), by Joachim Patinir, Museo del Prado, Madrid.

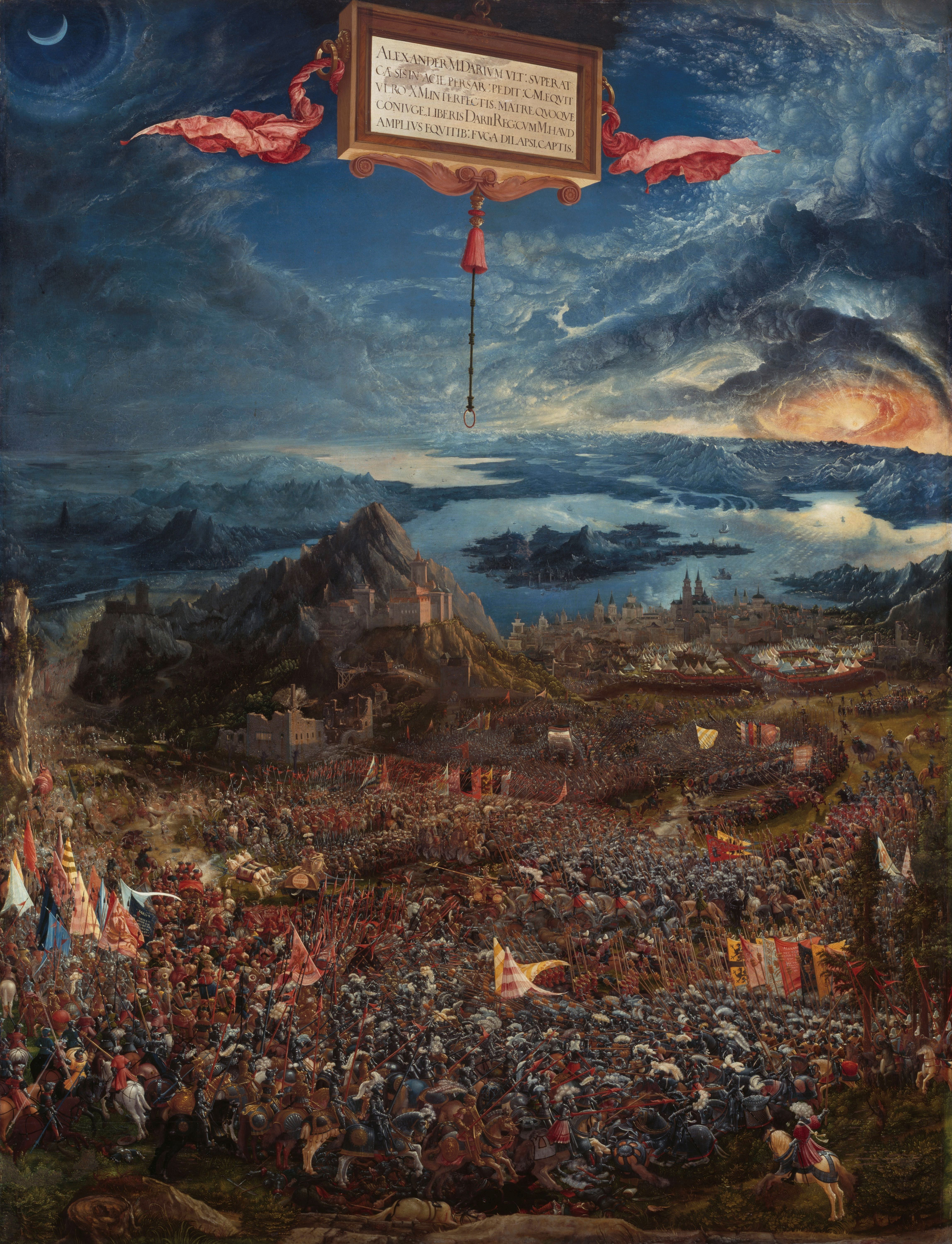
The Battle of Alexander at Issos (1529), by Albrecht Altdorfer, Alte Pinakothek, Munich.

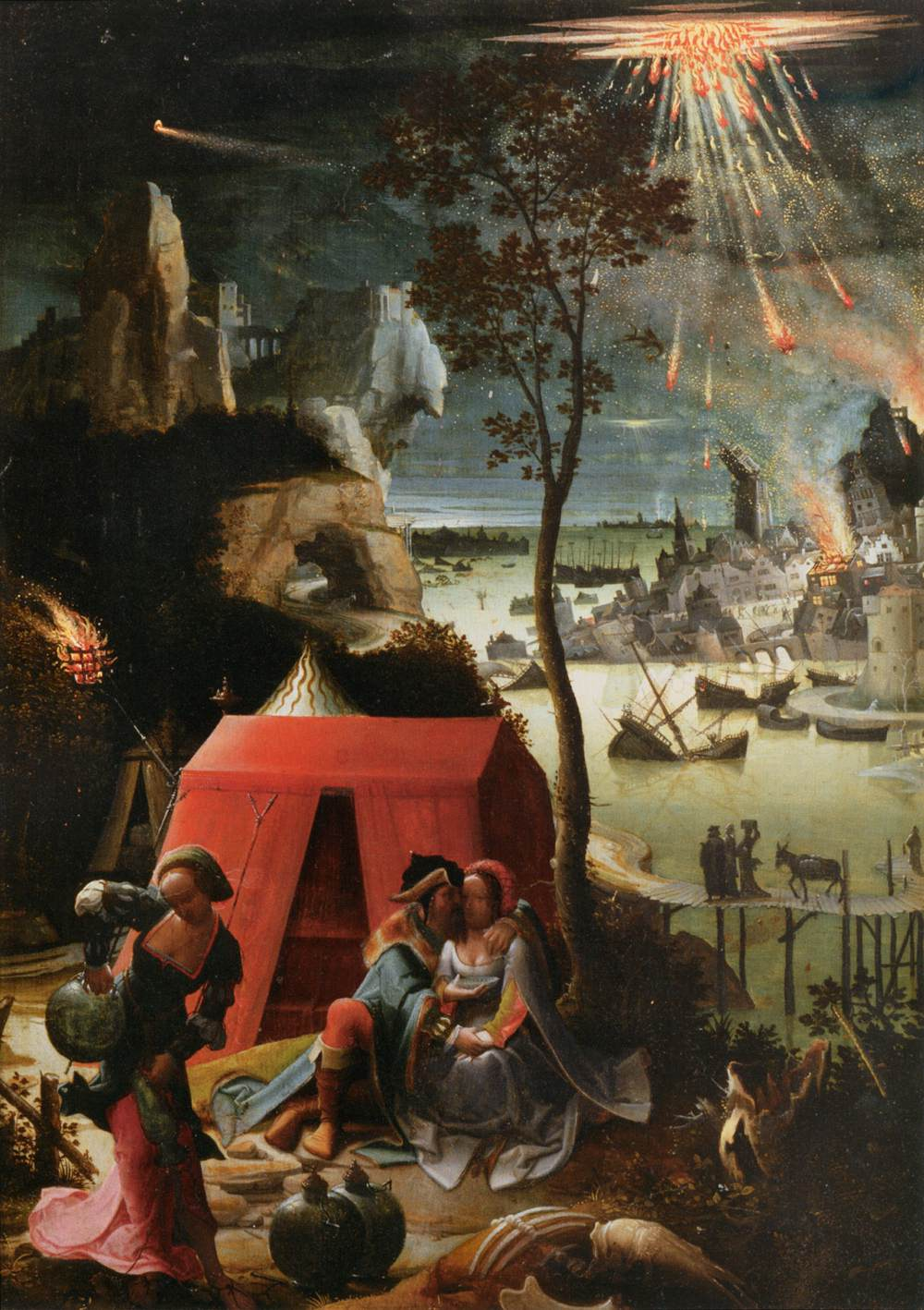
Lot and his daughters (c. 1530), anonymous, Musée du Louvre, Paris.

==== Mannerism ====
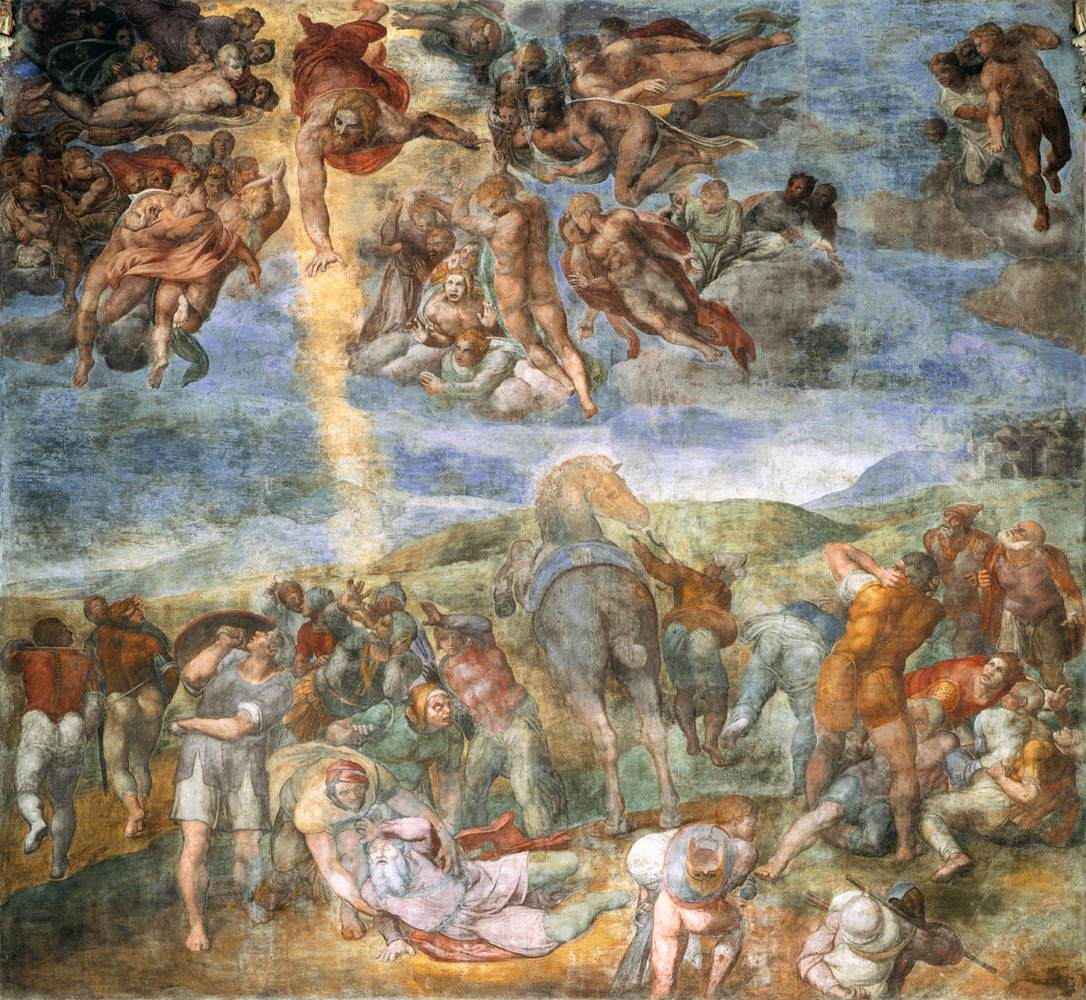
Conversion of Saint Paul (1549), by Michelangelo, Pauline Chapel, Vatican City.

At the end of the High Renaissance, in the middle of the 16th century, Mannerism emerged as a reaction against classical naturalism. Artists abandoned nature as the primary model in favor of a more expressive and subjective approach, characterized by stylized forms, distorted proportions and perspectives, and artificial atmospheres. Light was treated in an unconventional and unreal manner, often combining cold moonlight with warm firelight. Night scenes became frequent, with intense chromatic contrasts and dynamic rhythms that broke with Renaissance harmony. In Mannerism, light assumed an expressive rather than structural role, disrupting classical balance, as seen in the works of Pontormo, Rosso or Beccafumi.

Mannerist painters also broke with the Renaissance optical system by suppressing the clear relationship between light sources and illuminated areas, as well as the gradual transitions between light and shadow. This resulted in abrupt contrasts, strong chromaticism, and an artificial brilliance independent of any identifiable source.

Between Renaissance classicism and Mannerism stands Michelangelo, whose use of light was primarily sculptural but could become highly dramatic. In the frescoes of the Pauline Chapel—the Crucifixion of Saint Peter and the Conversion of Saint Paul (1549)—he exploited the chapel’s natural lighting: the darker wall reinforces the tragic intensity of the Crucifixion, while the Conversion is illuminated by both natural light and a powerful divine ray, emphasizing the moment of spiritual transformation.

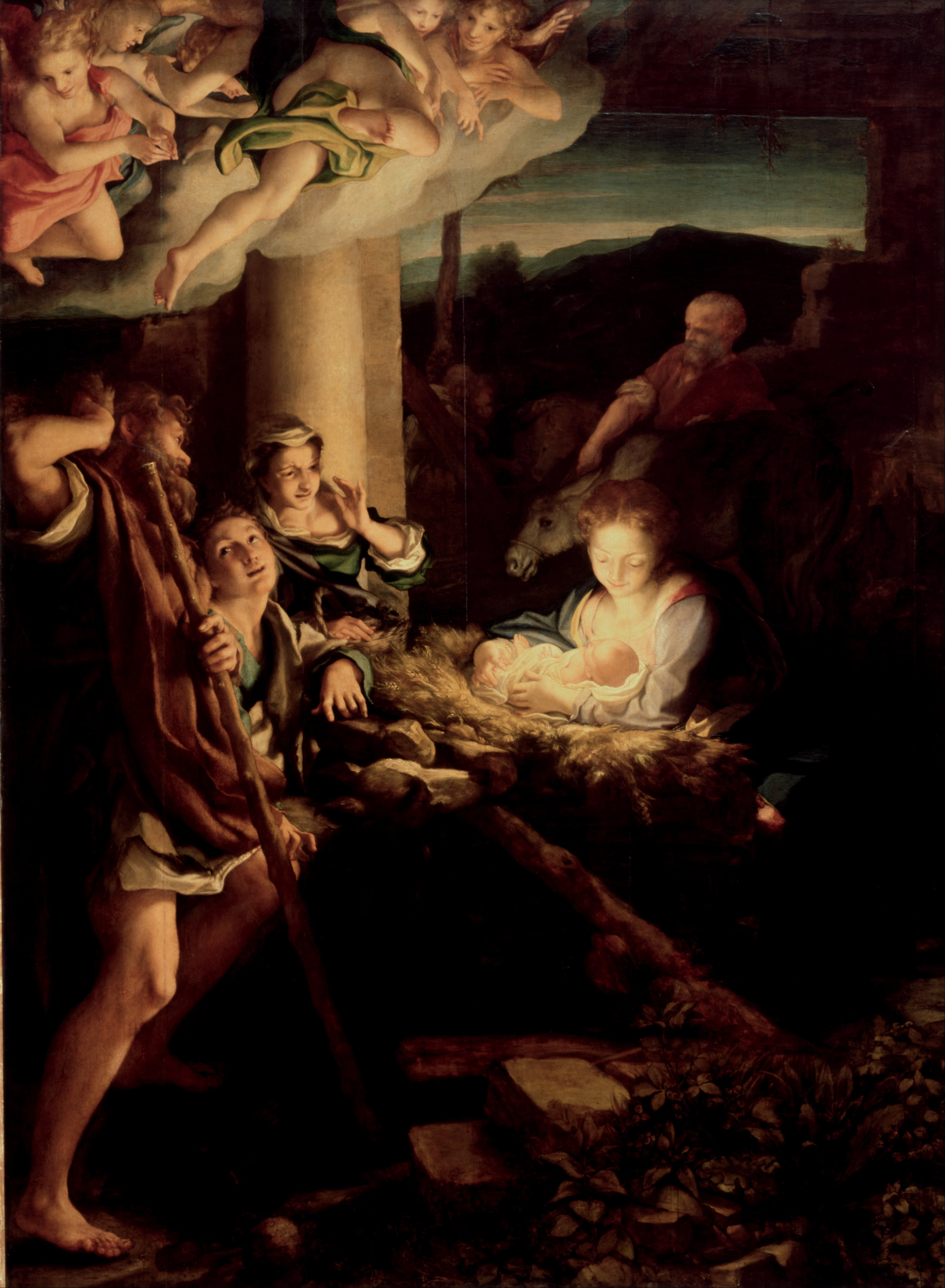
The Nativity (1522), by Correggio, Gallery of Old Masters Paintings, Dresden.

Another reference of Mannerism was Correggio, who pioneered the use of dark tonal grounds to enhance depth and developed a refined sfumato with soft transitions and diffuse light. In The Nativity (1522), he presented Christ’s birth as a “miracle of light,” a motif that became influential. His dome fresco of the Assumption of the Virgin (1526–1530) introduced dramatic illusionism and foreshadowed Baroque spatial effects through sotto in sù perspective.

Jacopo Pontormo developed an intensely emotional style with unstable space and expressive color, while Beccafumi experimented with unusual lighting and chromatic effects. Rosso Fiorentino likewise employed unconventional color and dramatic light–shadow contrasts. Luca Cambiasso’s interest in nocturnal illumination anticipated tenebrism, while Bernardino Luini retained a Leonardesque softness in his treatment of light.

Alongside this expressive Mannerism, a more serene Venetian school developed, distinguished by its treatment of light and color. In the work of Giorgione, Titian, Tintoretto and Veronese, form was subordinated to luminous and chromatic values. Linear perspective gave way to aerial perspective, and color assumed the function of light and shadow. This approach, known as tonalism, relied on layered glazes to model form through tonal relationships, creating volume through color modulation rather than drawing.

Giorgione introduced Leonardesque principles to Venice and was among the first to prioritize mood over narrative. Vasari regarded him, alongside Leonardo, as a founder of modern painting. His landscapes, conceived through subtle modulation of light and color, transformed the genre, as exemplified by The Tempest (1508), where atmosphere and luminous depth dominate the composition.

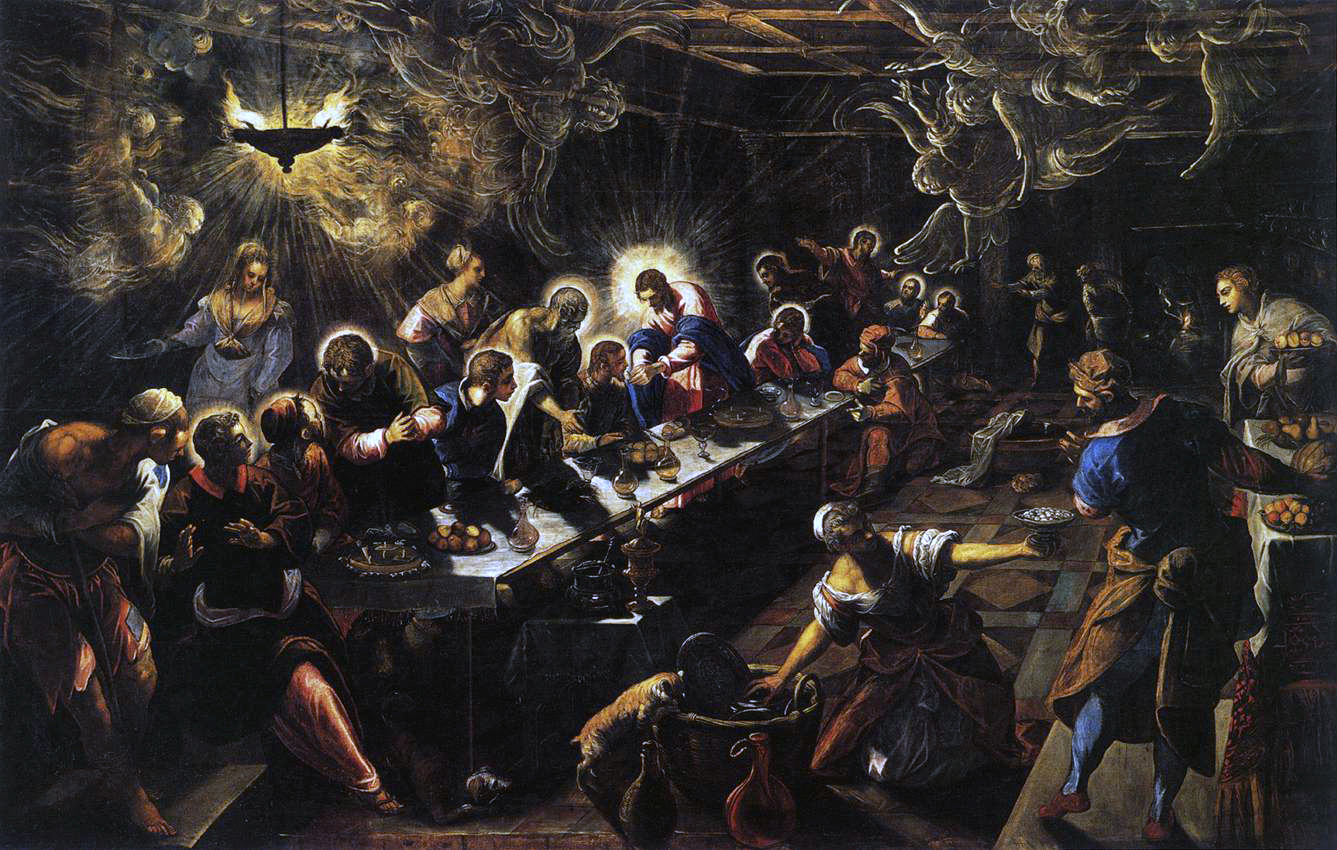
Last Supper (1592-1594), by Tintoretto, Basilica of San Giorgio Maggiore, Venice.

Titian was a master of atmospheric luminosity, creating vibrant effects through subtle gradations of light achieved by close observation of reality and exceptional technical control. In Pentecost (1546, Santa Maria della Salute, Venice), rays of light emanate from the dove of the Holy Spirit and culminate in tongues of fire over the apostles, producing innovative luminous effects. His research gradually evolved toward greater drama and emphasis on artificial light, as in The Martyrdom of Saint Lawrence (1558, Jesuit Church, Venice), where torchlight and fire are combined with a supernatural burst of divine light projected onto the saint. This approach strongly influenced Veronese, Tintoretto, Jacopo Bassano and El Greco.

Tintoretto favored nocturnal settings lit by candles and torches (di notte e di fuoco). His paintings feature deep atmospheres, elongated figures, and intense artificial illumination, with strong chiaroscuro and phosphorescent effects. Similar lighting appears in the work of the Bassano family and the Lombard painters Savoldo and Moretto da Brescia, and it anticipated Baroque tenebrism.

Jacopo Bassano likewise explored night scenes and indirect lighting, combining natural and artificial sources to striking effect, as in Christ in the House of Mary, Martha and Lazarus (c. 1577, Museum of Fine Arts, Houston).

Boy Blowing on an Ember (1571-1572), by El Greco, Capodimonte Museum, Naples.

Paolo Veronese, heir to the luminism of Giovanni Bellini and Vittore Carpaccio, favored clear, golden daylight in grand architectural settings, minimizing shadow to enhance the brilliance of fabrics and jewels. In Allegory of the Battle of Lepanto (1571), he contrasted the battle scene below with a celestial vision above, where angels hurl lightning toward the combat, creating dramatic lighting effects.

Outside Italy, Pieter Brueghel the Elder demonstrated a keen sensitivity to natural light in landscapes and genre scenes. Influenced at times by Bosch’s fiery effects, as in The Triumph of Death, he also used the sun as an explicit light source, varying its color and intensity according to season and time of day, as in The Flemish Proverbs, The Census at Bethlehem, and Landscape with the Fall of Icarus.

El Greco, active in Spain, developed a highly personal style shaped by Venetian colorism, Michelangelo’s figural conception, and Byzantine traditions. In his work, light predominates over shadow as a symbol of spiritual truth. In The Expolio (1577, Toledo Cathedral), a zenithal light isolates Christ’s face as the focal point. In the Trinity at Santo Domingo el Antiguo, he introduced a radiant golden gloria, while in The Martyrdom of Saint Maurice he contrasted earthly light with a celestial burst above. In his late Adoration of the Shepherds (1612–1613), the Christ Child becomes the source of illumination, radiating intense chromatic light.

El Greco’s lighting evolved from Venetian naturalism toward a Byzantine-inspired, non-natural light without a defined source. This arbitrary and multiple illumination produces hallucinatory effects. His method progressed from dark to light tones, finished with touches of white to create shimmering highlights. Achieved through glazes and dry whites, his light is mystical and subjective, marked by incandescent reflections and spectral brilliance.

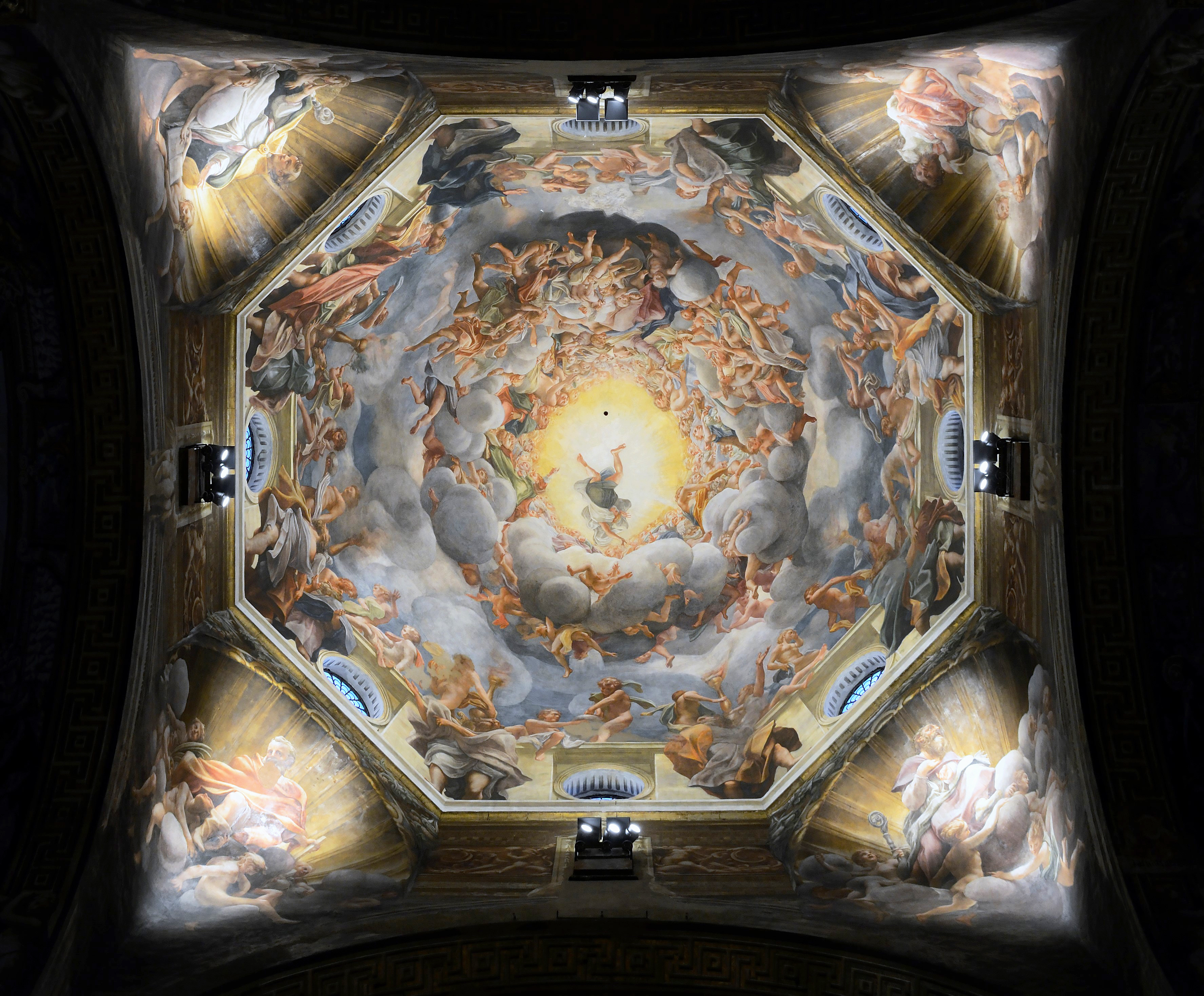
The Assumption of the Virgin (1526-1530), by Correggio, Parma Cathedral.

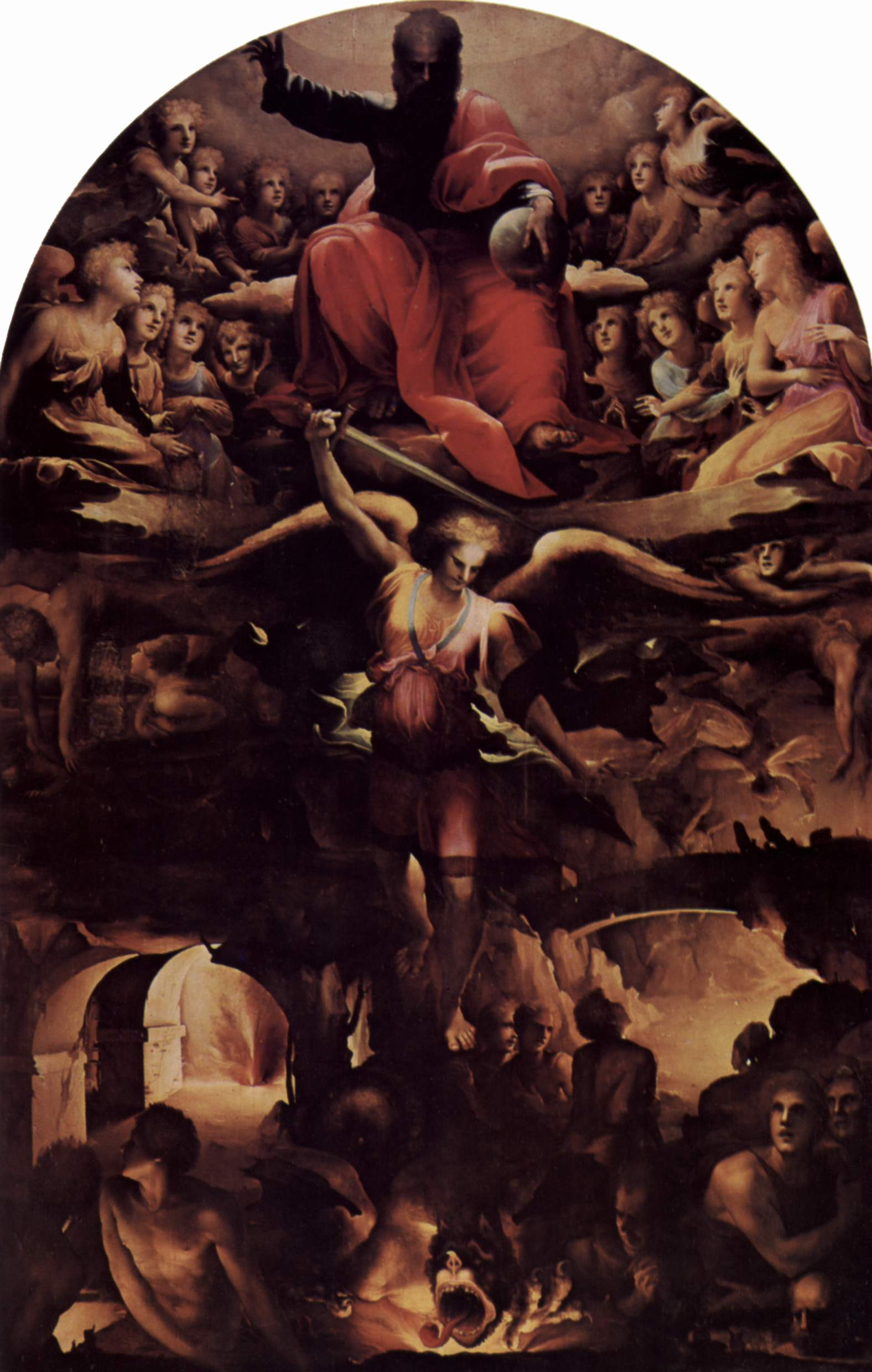
The fall of the rebellious angels (1526-1530), by Domenico Beccafumi, San Niccolò del Carmine, Siena.

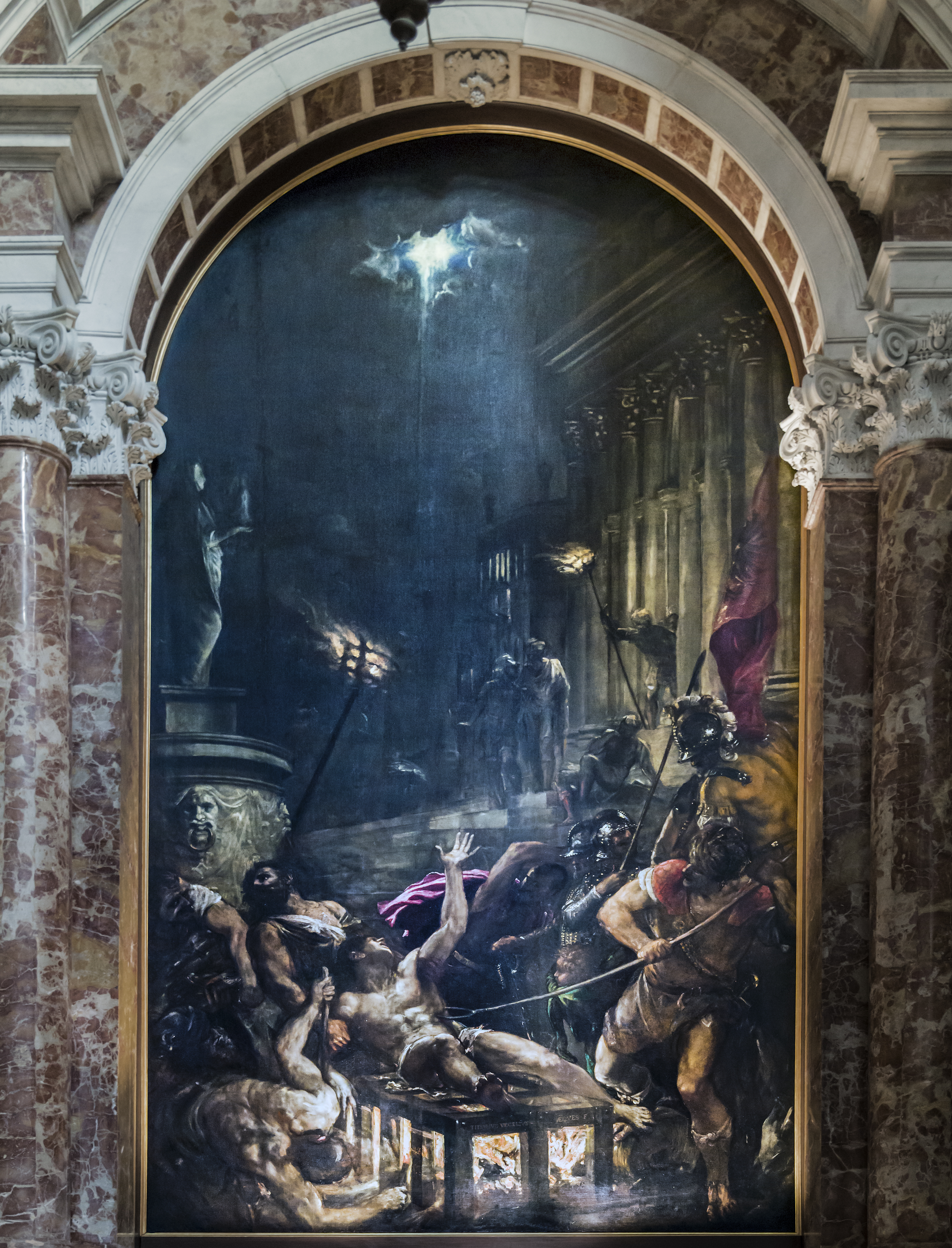
The Martyrdom of Saint Lawrence (1558), by Titian, Church of the Jesuits, Venice

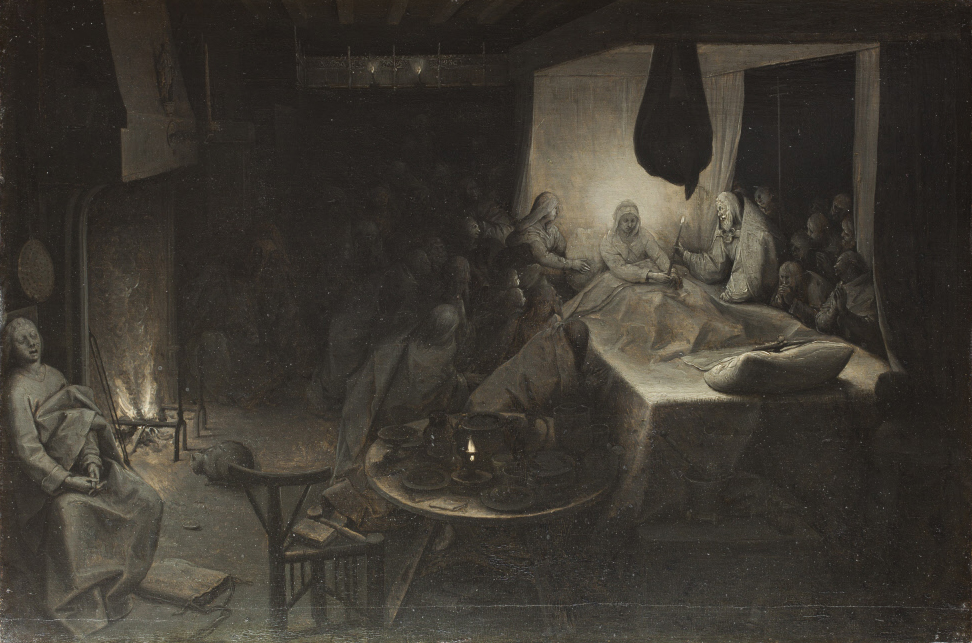
The Death of the Virgin Mary (c. 1564), by Pieter Brueghel the Elder, National Trust, Upton House, Banbury.

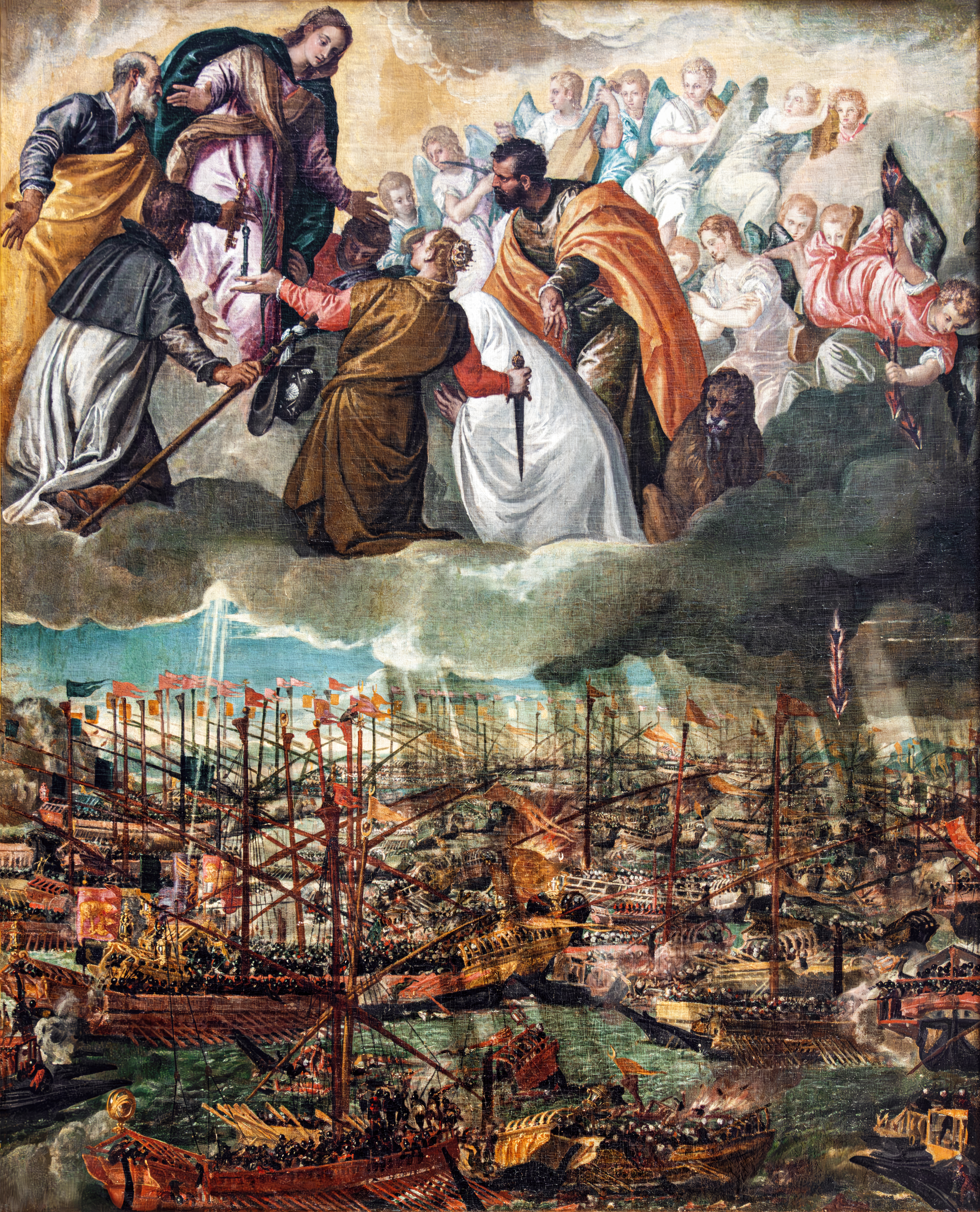
Allegory of the Battle of Lepanto (1571), by Veronese, Galleria dell'Accademia, Venice.

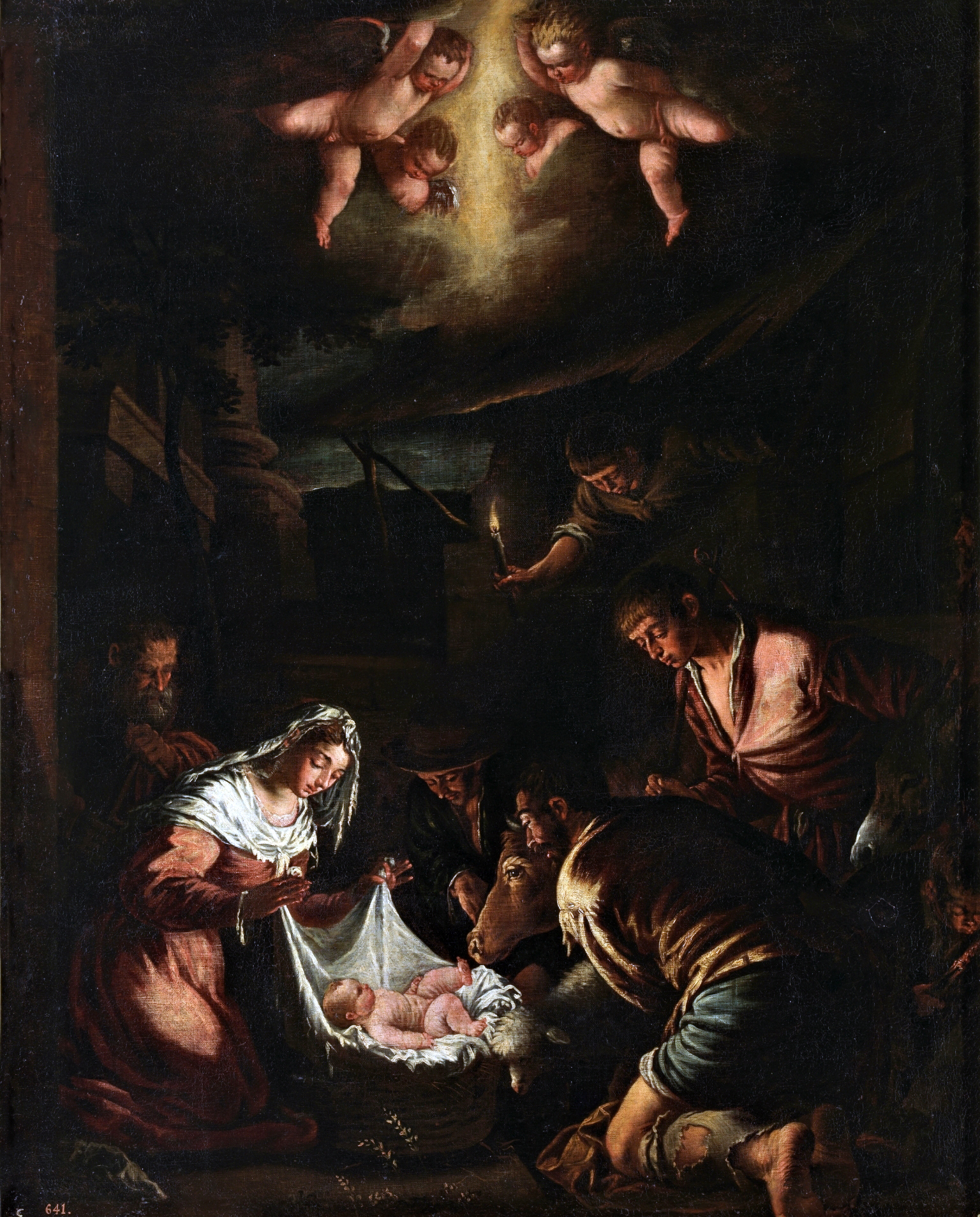
Adoration of the Shepherds (c. 1575), by Jacopo Bassano, Museo del Prado, Madrid.

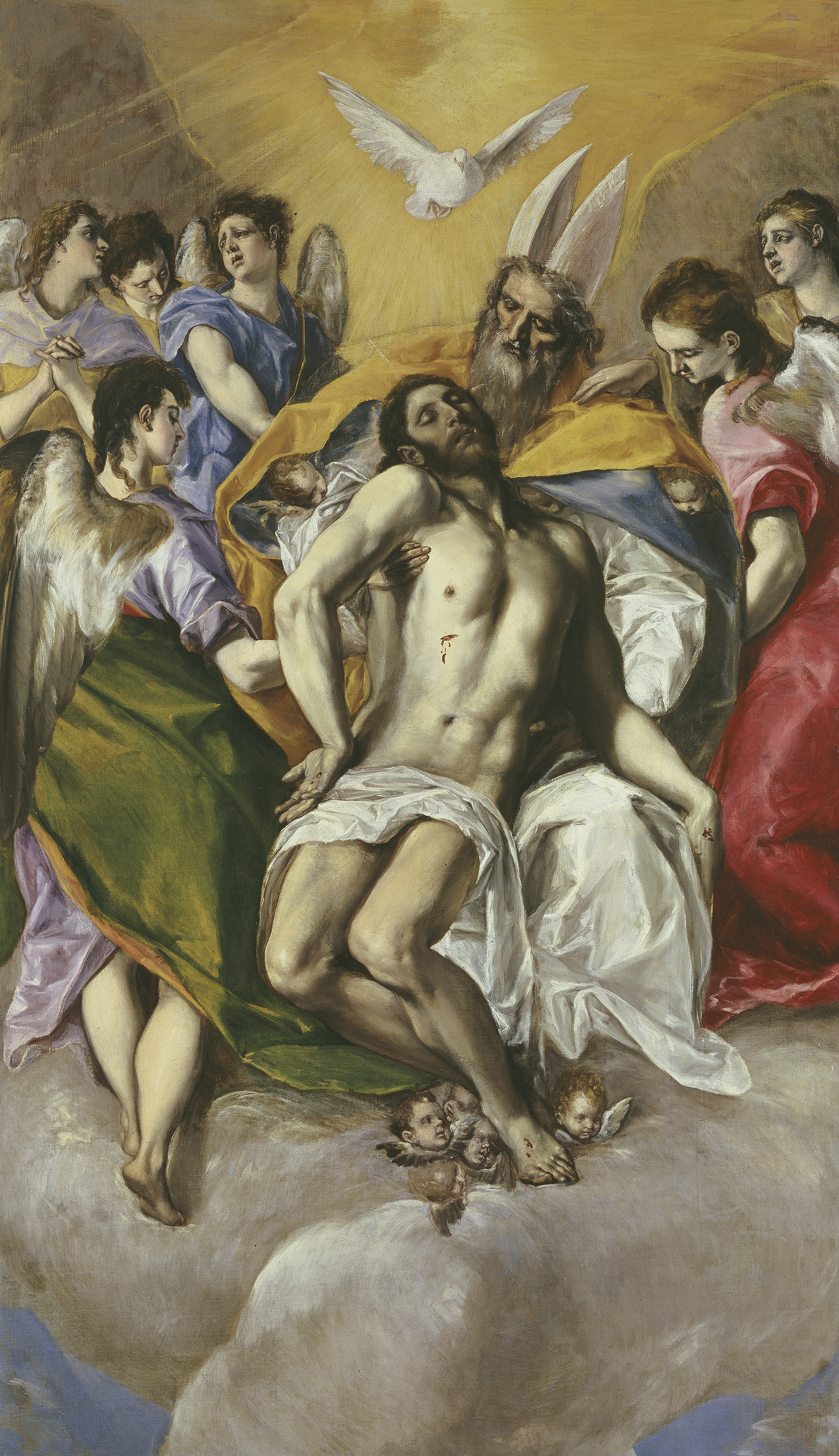
Trinity (1577-1580), by El Greco, Museo del Prado, Madrid.

==== Barroco ====
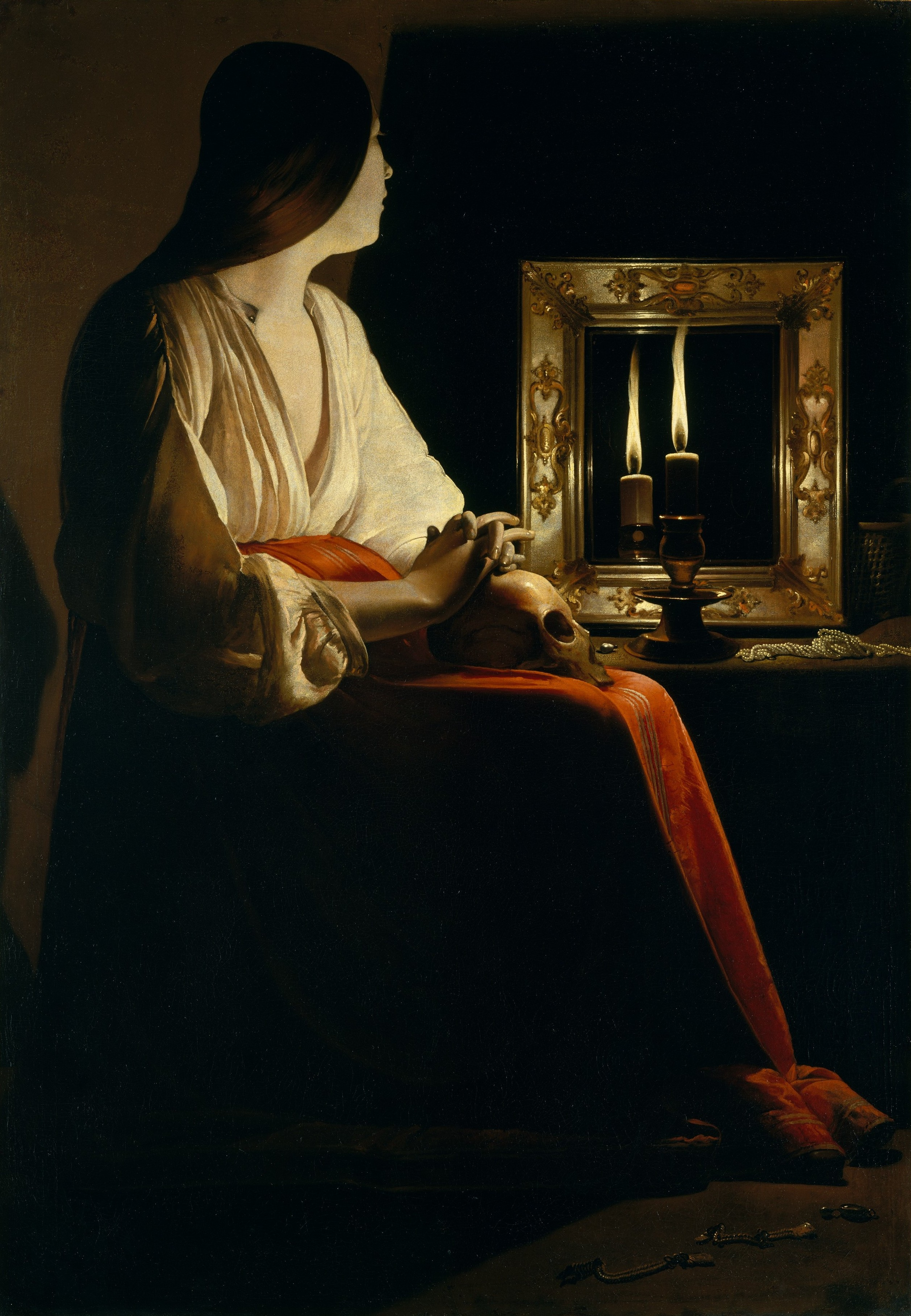
Penitent Magdalene (1625), by Georges de La Tour, Metropolitan Museum of Art, New York

The 17th-century Baroque marked a decisive evolution in the use of light in painting. While retaining some classical rationalism, Baroque art embraced dynamism, drama, and theatricality, emphasizing optical effects and illusionistic scenography. Its development varied geographically, giving rise to distinctive national schools, but Italian influence remained central. Two main tendencies emerged: naturalism (or Caravagism), which emphasized the realistic imitation of nature and strong chiaroscuro, and classicism, which combined realism with intellectual and idealized interpretations of reality. Later, the “full Baroque” period favored decorative, mural, and illusionistic painting, often with trompe-l’œil effects and sumptuous scenographies.

During this era, scientific research into light profoundly influenced artistic techniques. Figures such as Johannes Kepler, Francesco Maria Grimaldi, Isaac Newton, Christiaan Huygens, Robert Boyle contributed to understanding optics and color. Newton, in particular, demonstrated that white light comprises a spectrum of colors and created the first chromatic circle, revealing relationships between colors. This scientific progress allowed painters to treat light not merely as an atmospheric or symbolic effect but as a compositional system, a principal element shaping the visual experience of a painting. In the Baroque, light was studied for the first time as a system of composition, articulating it as a regulating element of the painting: light fulfills several functions, such as symbolic, modeling and illumination, and begins to be directed as an emphatic element, selective of the part of the painting to be highlighted, so that artificial light becomes more important, which can be manipulated at the free will of the artist. Sacred light (nimbus, haloes) was abandoned and natural light was used exclusively, even as a symbolic element. On the other hand, the light of different times of the day (morning, twilight) began to be distinguished. Illumination was conceived as a luminous unit, as opposed to the multiple sources of Renaissance light; in the Baroque there may be several sources, but they are circumscribed to a global and unitary sense of the work.

The Baroque also popularized the nocturne genre, which posed particular challenges for light representation. Artists had to simulate darkness and illumination from natural night sources (moon, stars) or artificial sources (candles, torches, lanterns, bonfires, fireworks). These light sources could be either visible in the scene or implied from outside the frame, producing striking chiaroscuro contrasts and dramatic atmospheres.

===== Naturalism =====
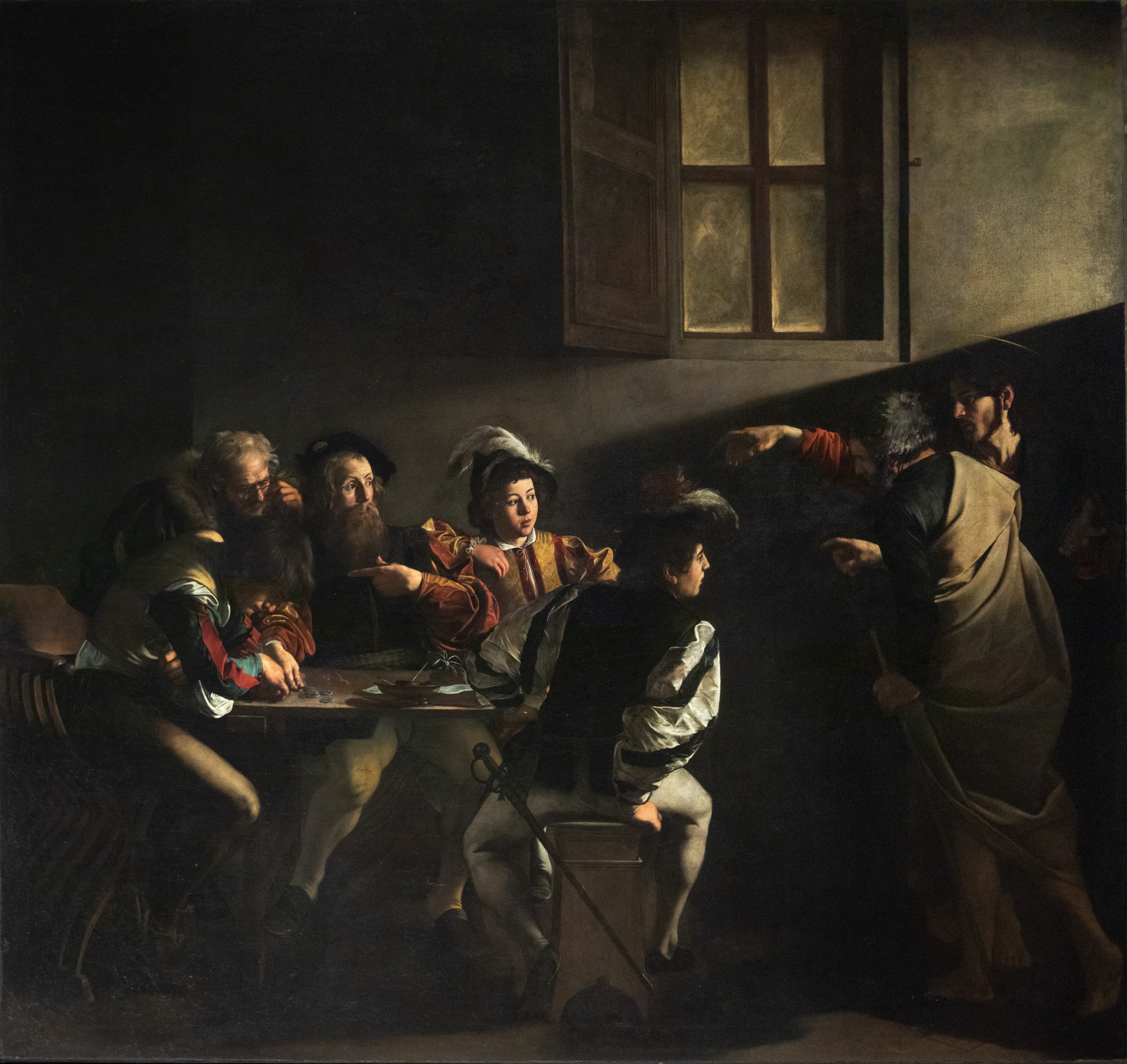
The Vocation of Saint Matthew (1601), by Caravaggio, Church of San Luigi dei Francesi, Rome.

Chiaroscuro resurfaced in the Baroque, particularly during the Counter-Reformation, as a means of directing attention to the essential elements of religious painting, in contrast to Renaissance pictorial decor. Its most extreme form was tenebrism, characterized by sharp contrasts of light and shadow and intense, often artificial illumination that highlights selected areas. This produced a strong dramatic effect, especially in religious scenes, though also in mythological subjects and still lifes. Major exponents included Caravaggio, Orazio and Artemisia Gentileschi, Bartolomeo Manfredi, Carlo Saraceni, Giovanni Battista Caracciolo, Pieter van Laer (il Bamboccio), Adam Elsheimer, Gerard van Honthorst, Georges de La Tour, Valentin de Boulogne, the Le Nain brothers and José de Ribera (lo Spagnoletto).

Caravaggio pioneered the dramatic use of light in dark interiors, employing directed illumination to emphasize key figures. Light became a structural element in his work, shaping space and determining composition. Influenced by Leonardo’s chiaroscuro, he used strong contrasts in which figures emerge from darkness, with light defining their presence and significance. This light is conceptual rather than imitative, functioning as a substantive and spatial element.

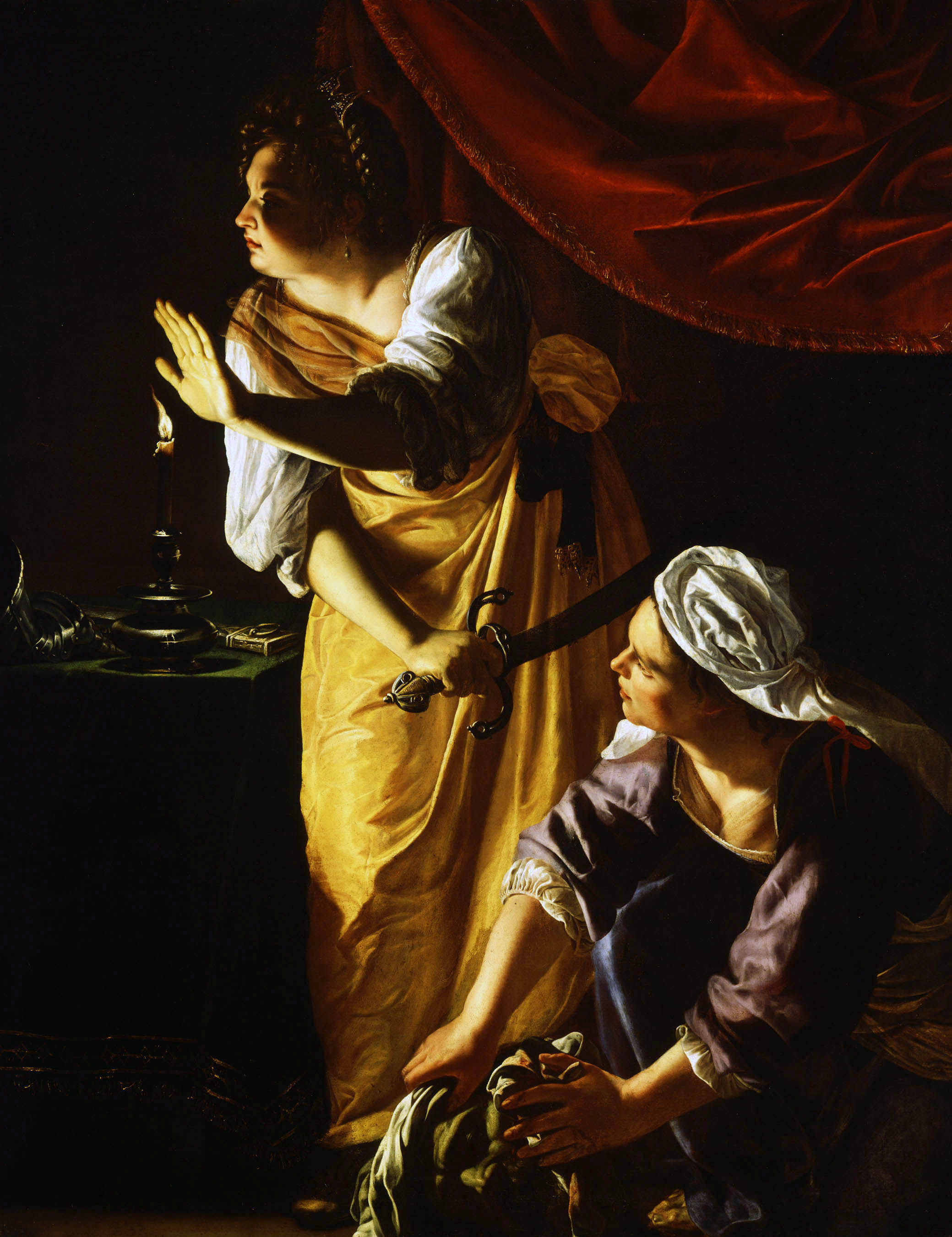
Judith and her servant girl with the head of Holofernes (c. 1625), by Artemisia Gentileschi, Detroit Institute of Arts, Detroit

A hallmark of his style is the diagonal entry of light, seen in works such as Boy with a Basket of Fruit and the Contarelli Chapel paintings, where illumination unifies composition and reinforces narrative focus. In later works, he intensified dramatic tension through complex lighting effects.

Artemisia Gentileschi adopted Caravaggesque tenebrism, emphasizing dramatic scenes, expressive light, and solid anatomical forms. In Judith Beheading Holofernes, light isolates the central figures against a dark background. In later works, her style incorporated clearer spaces and a more classical balance, while maintaining chiaroscuro as a means of modeling form and space.

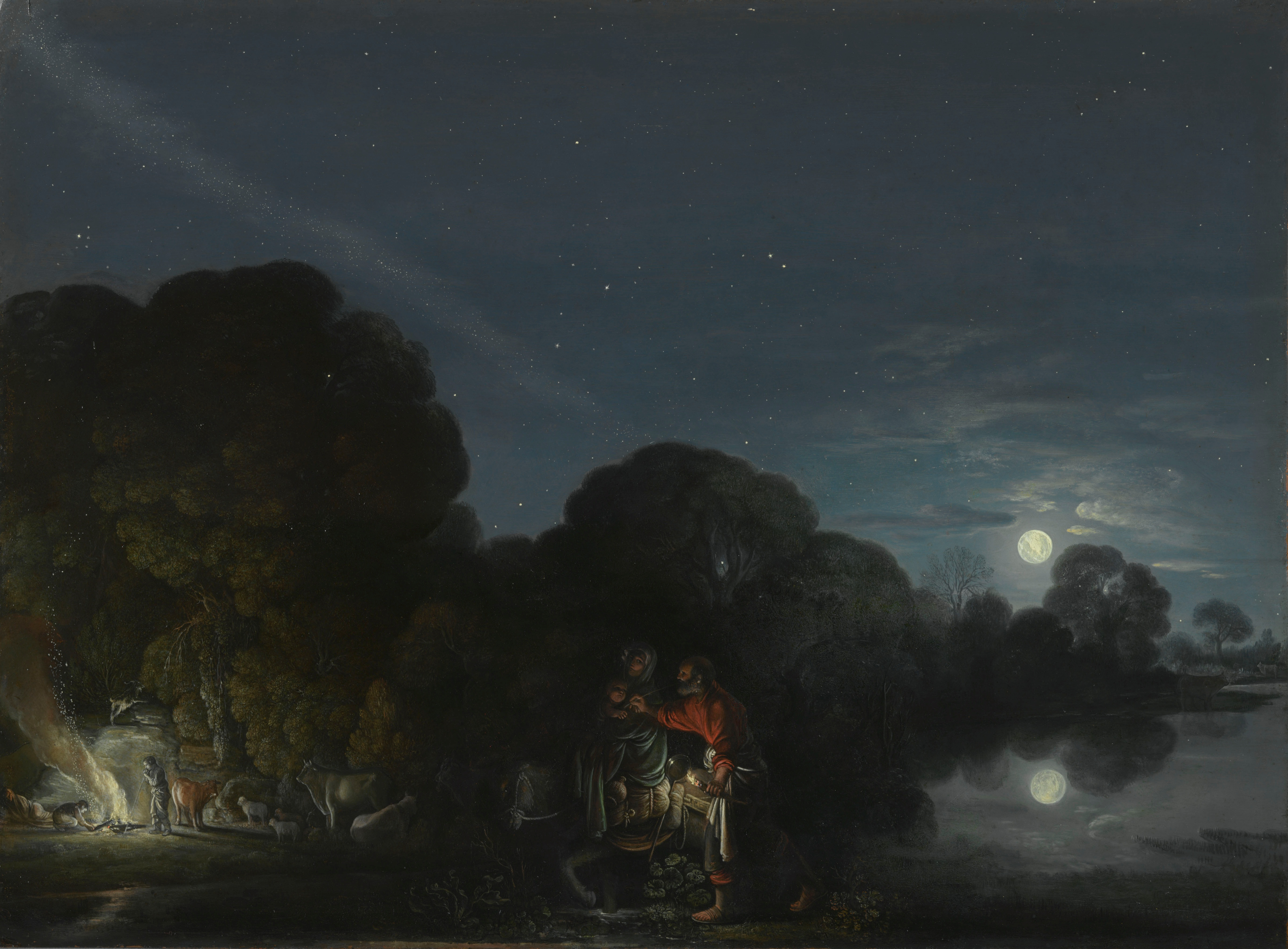
Flight into Egypt (1609), by Adam Elsheimer, Alte Pinakothek, Munich

Adam Elsheimer specialized in landscape lighting, exploring dawn, dusk, and nocturnal effects. His Flight into Egypt is notable for its multiple light sources and early naturalistic depiction of moonlight and the Milky Way.

Georges de La Tour focused on artificial light, especially candles, often placing the source within the scene to enhance dramatic and symbolic effects. His compositions alternate between visible light sources and concealed illumination, producing either direct or backlit effects. Despite their realism, his lighting is controlled and conceptual, serving compositional and symbolic purposes.

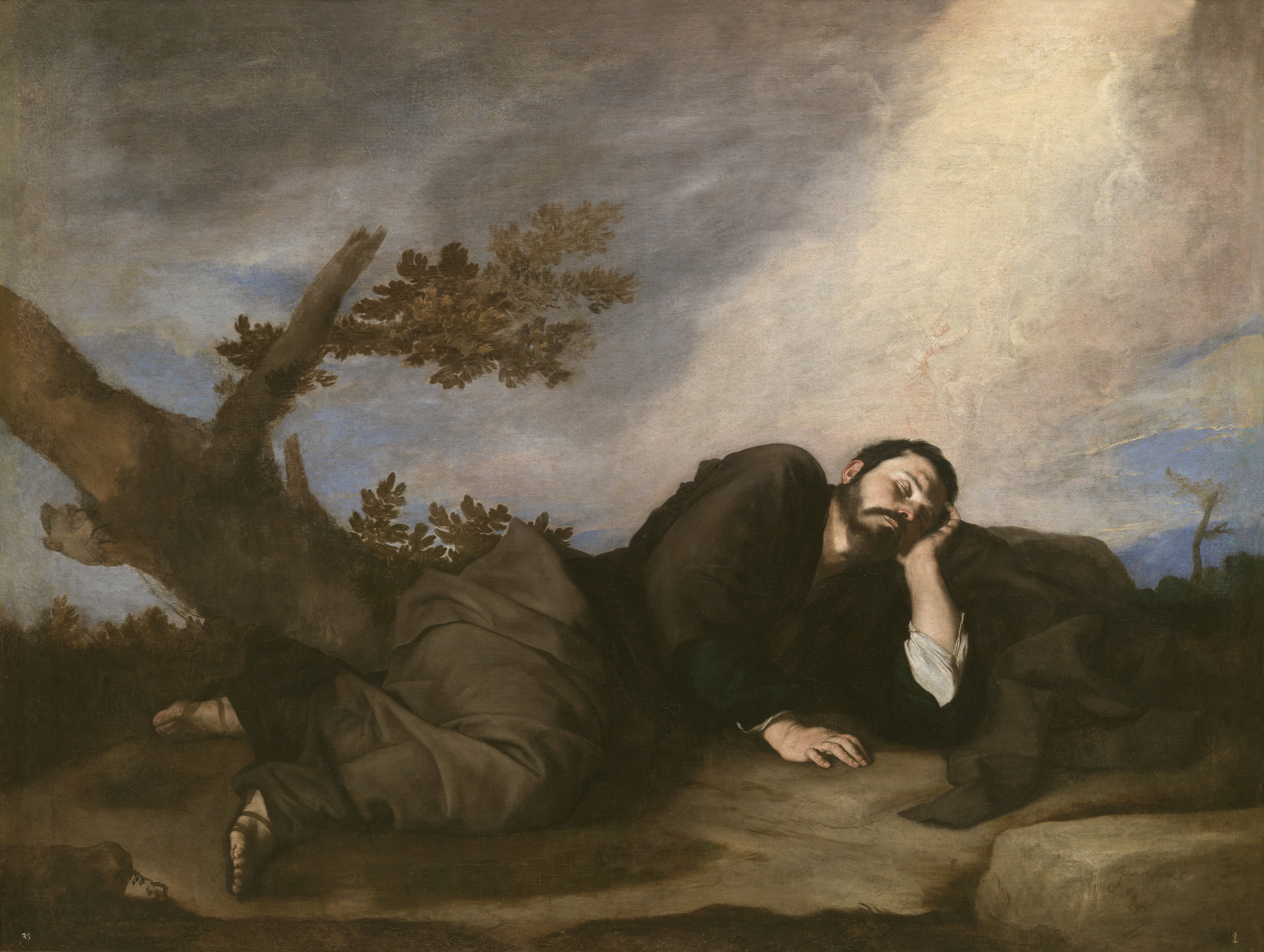
Jacob's Dream (1639), by José de Ribera, Museo del Prado, Madrid.

José de Ribera adopted Caravaggesque tenebrism with a more tactile and dynamic approach, using dense brushwork and strong contrasts. From the 1630s, he moved toward brighter palettes and clearer backgrounds while maintaining expressive lighting. In Spain, Caravaggism also influenced Juan Bautista Maíno, Juan Sánchez Cotán, Juan van der Hamen, and Francisco de Zurbarán, whose works combined tenebrism with elements of Venetian color and Flemish detail.

In the Netherlands, the Utrecht Caravaggists, such as Hendrik Terbrugghen, Dirck van Baburen, and Gerard van Honthorst, adapted Caravaggio’s chiaroscuro into a tonal and optical approach. Honthorst became especially known for candlelit scenes. Rembrandt developed a more diffuse and symbolic use of light, avoiding sharp contrasts in favor of subtle penumbra. His light, often concentrated in specific areas, dematerializes form and creates a sense of inner radiance, functioning as both structural and expressive element.

The Prodigal Son (1623), by Gerard van Honthorst, Alte Pinakothek, Munich

Johannes Vermeer refined the depiction of natural light in interior scenes, achieving a balance of clarity and softness. His use of color and light creates calm, luminous atmospheres, with forms defined through subtle tonal transitions. Light in his work is inseparable from color and serves as the primary means of constructing space and form.

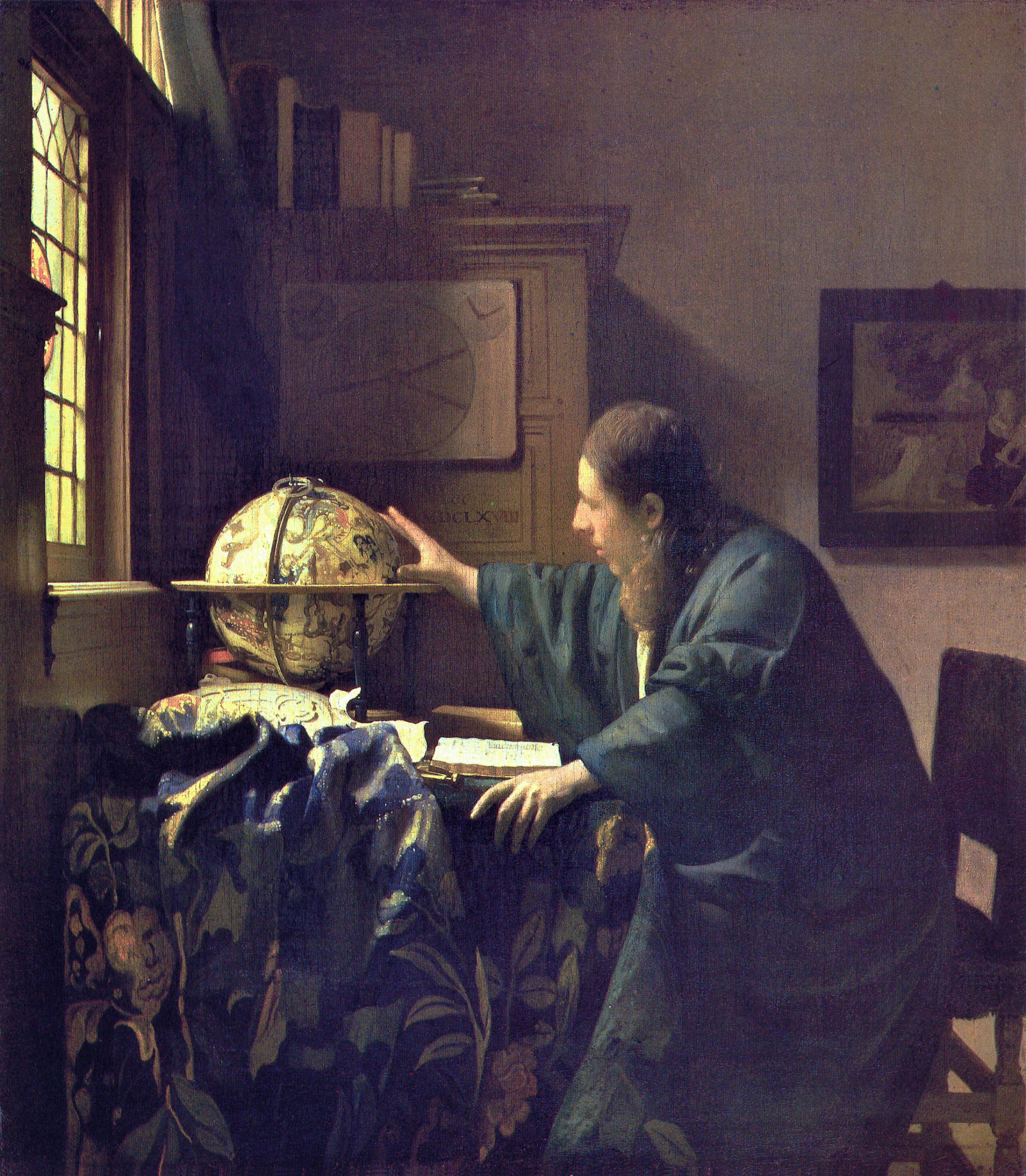
The Astronomer (1688), by Johannes Vermeer, Musée du Louvre, Paris

Other Dutch painters, including Frans Hals, Jacob Jordaens, and Godfried Schalcken, explored varied lighting effects, from diffuse luminosity to candlelit scenes. Landscape painting in Holland, developed by artists such as Jan van Goyen, Jacob van Ruysdael, and Aelbert Cuyp, emphasized atmospheric light and its interaction with nature, particularly in skies and reflections. Still life painting, represented by Willem Kalf, highlighted the reflective qualities of objects through precise rendering of light and texture.

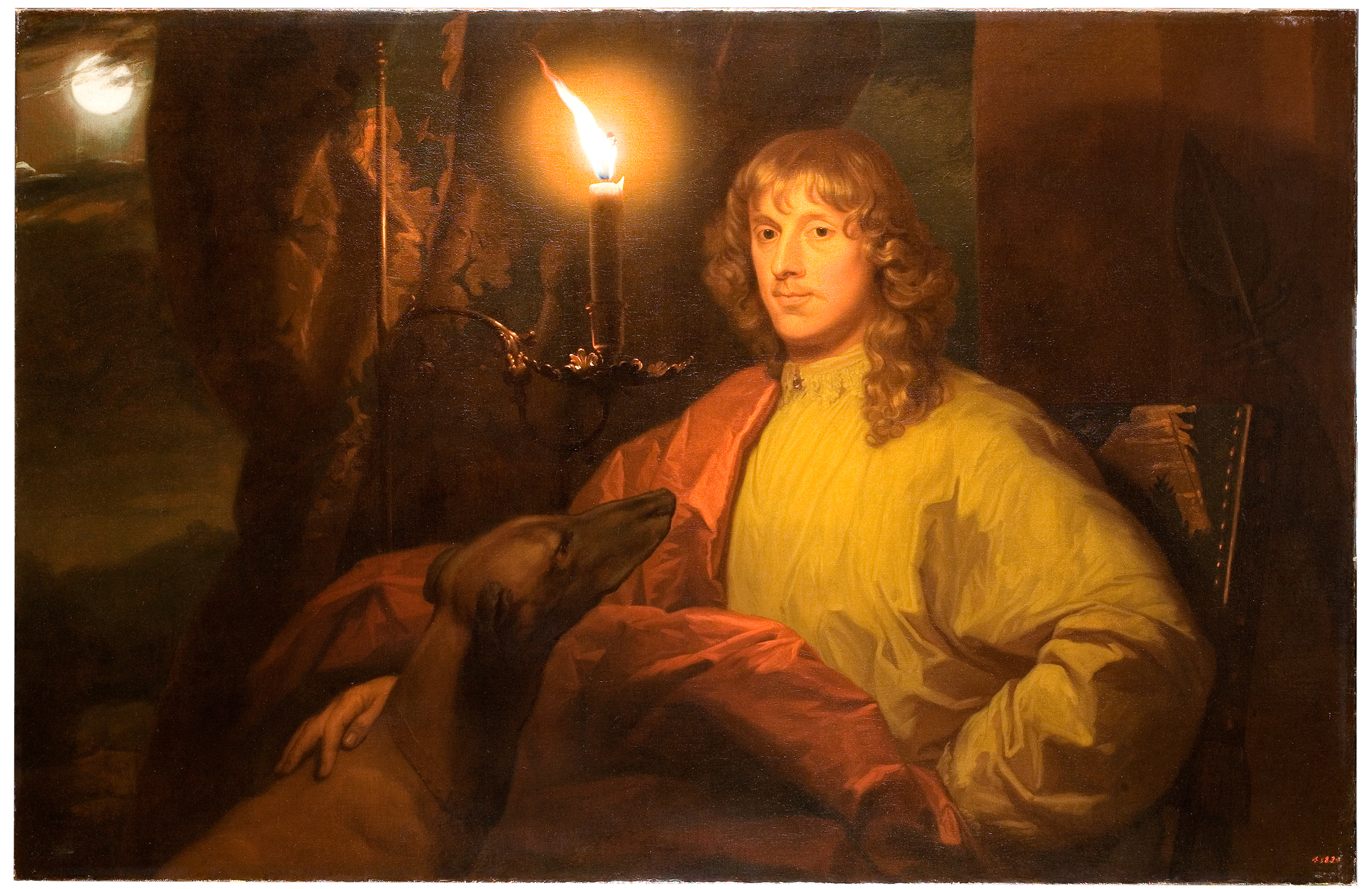
Portrait of James Stuart, Duke of Lennox and Richmond (1692-1696), by Godfried Schalcken, Leiden Collection, New York

Overall, Baroque artists transformed light into a central expressive and structural element, using it to shape space, enhance drama, and convey symbolic meaning across a wide range of genres .

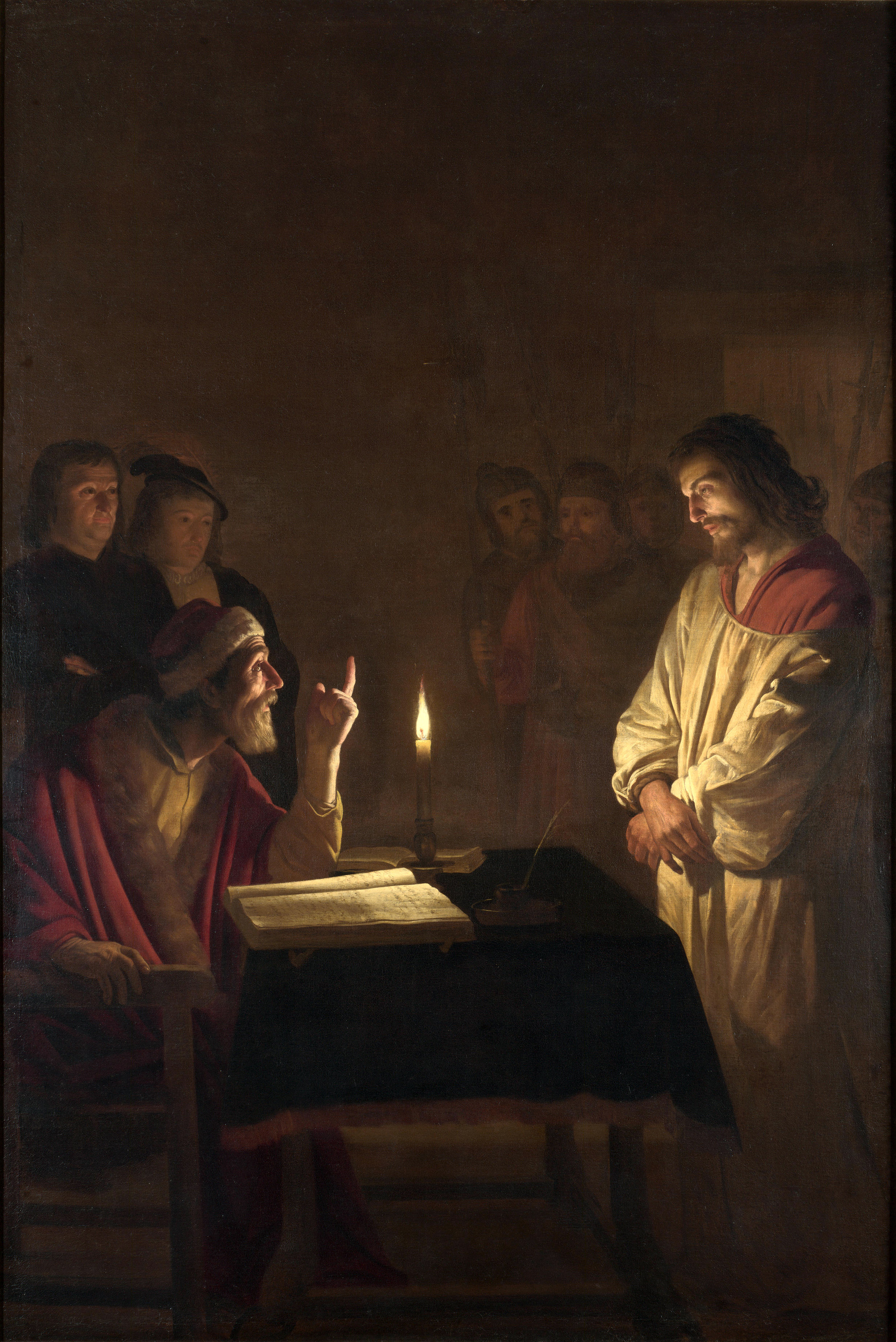
Christ before the High Priest (c. 1617), by Gerard van Honthorst, The National Gallery, London

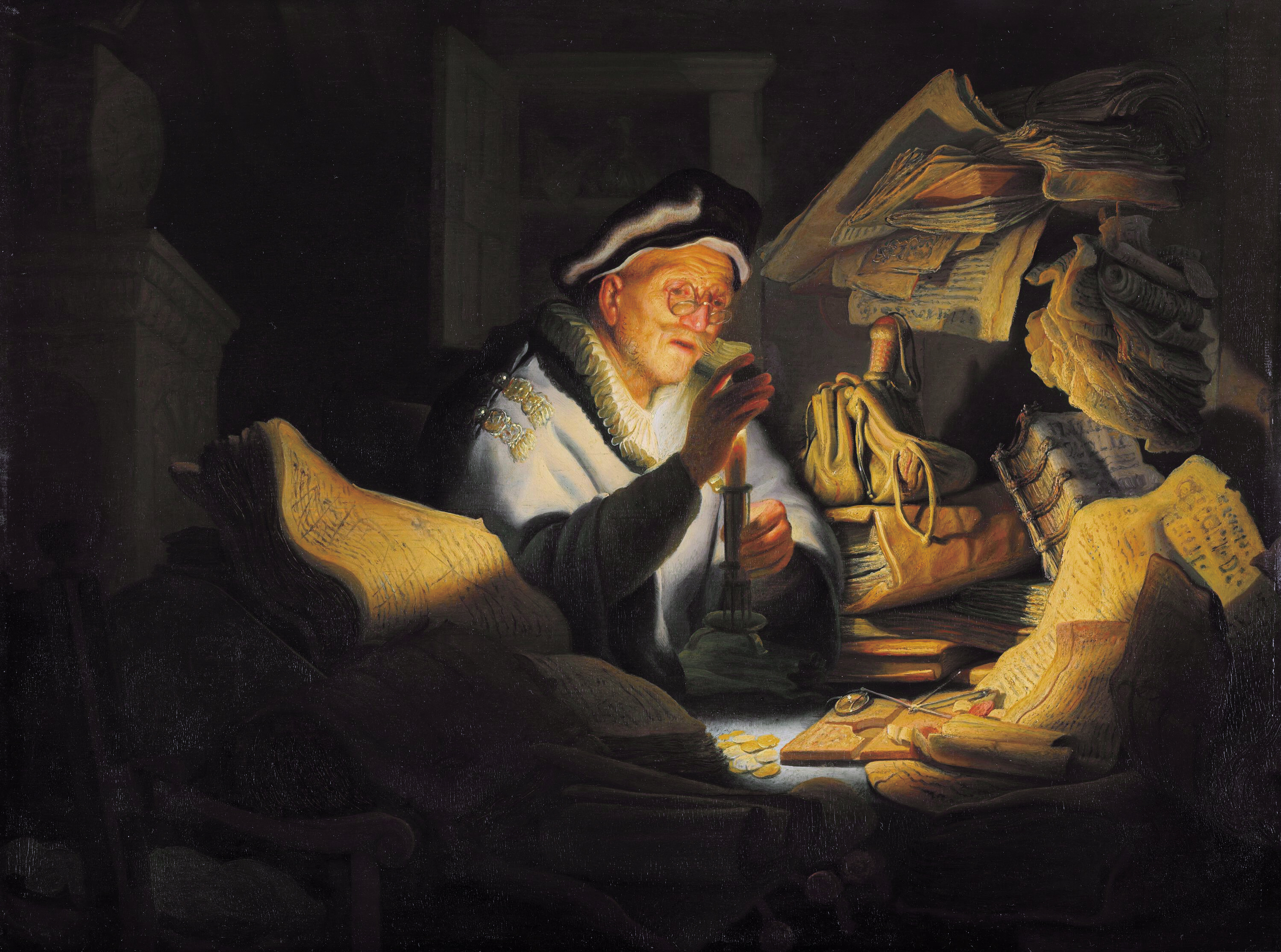
The Parable of the Rich Fool (1627), by Rembrandt, Gemäldegalerie, Berlin

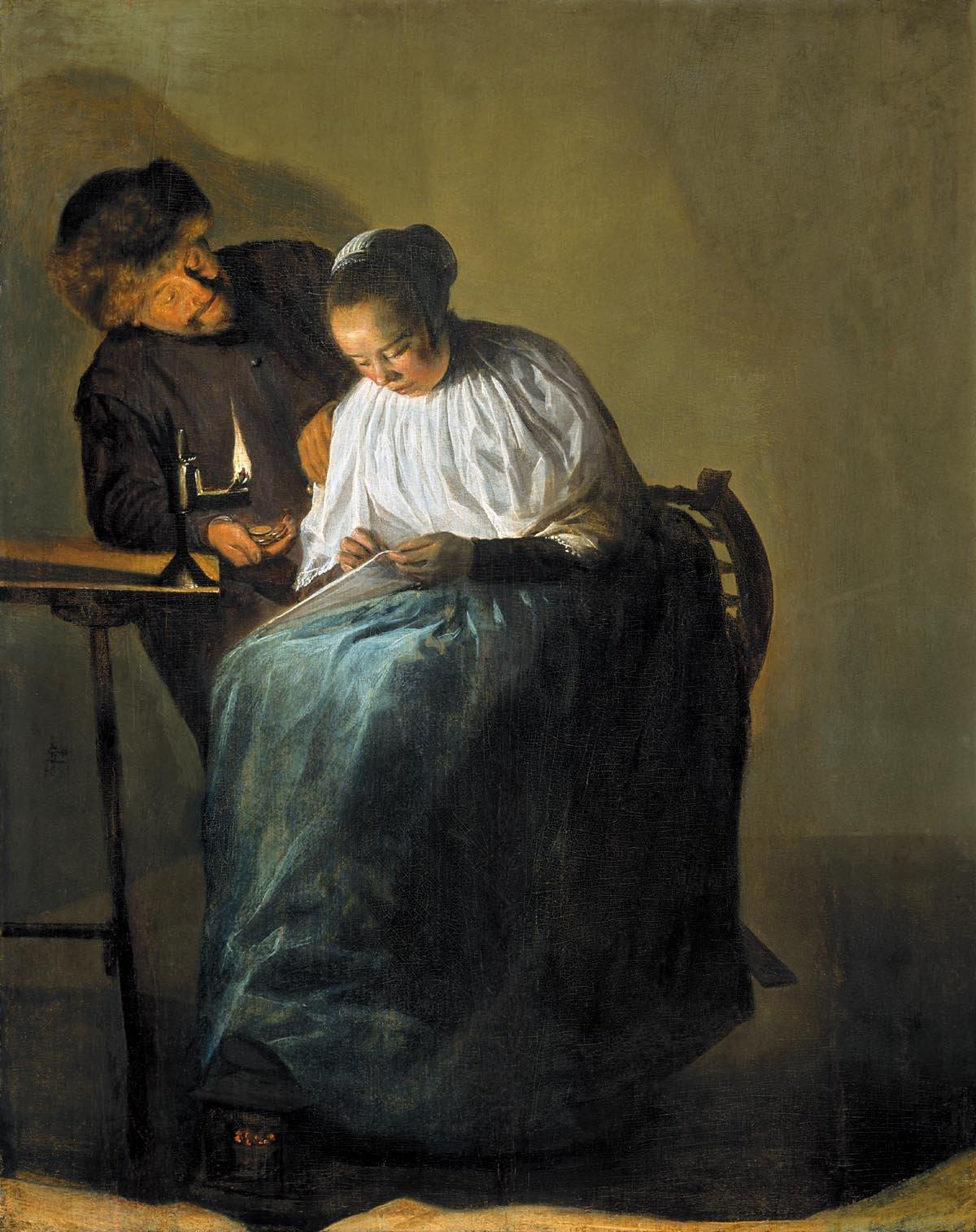
Man Offering Money to a Young Woman (1631), by Judith Leyster, Mauritshuis, The Hague

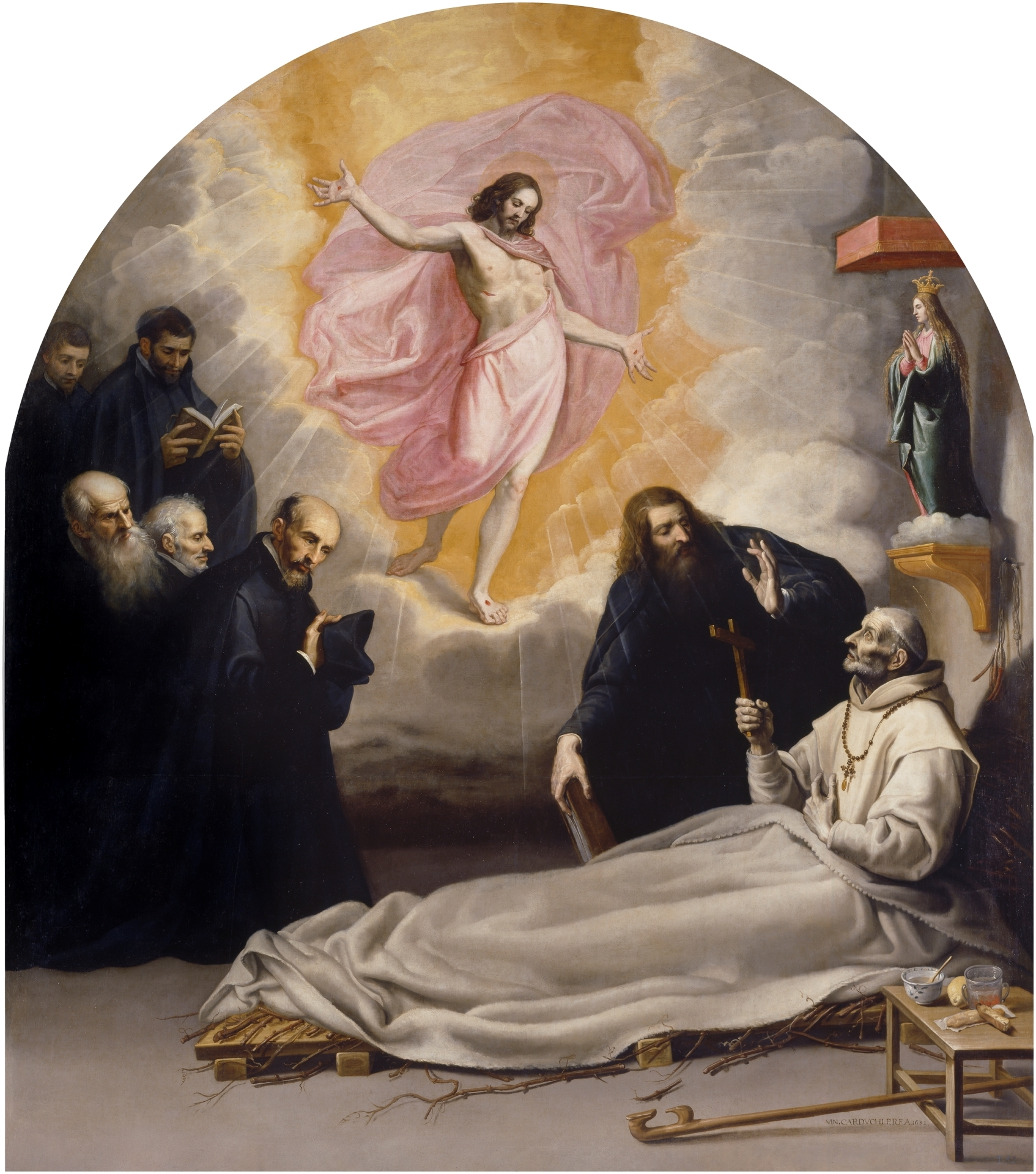
Death of the Venerable Odón de Novara (1632), by Vicente Carducho, Museo del Prado, Madrid.

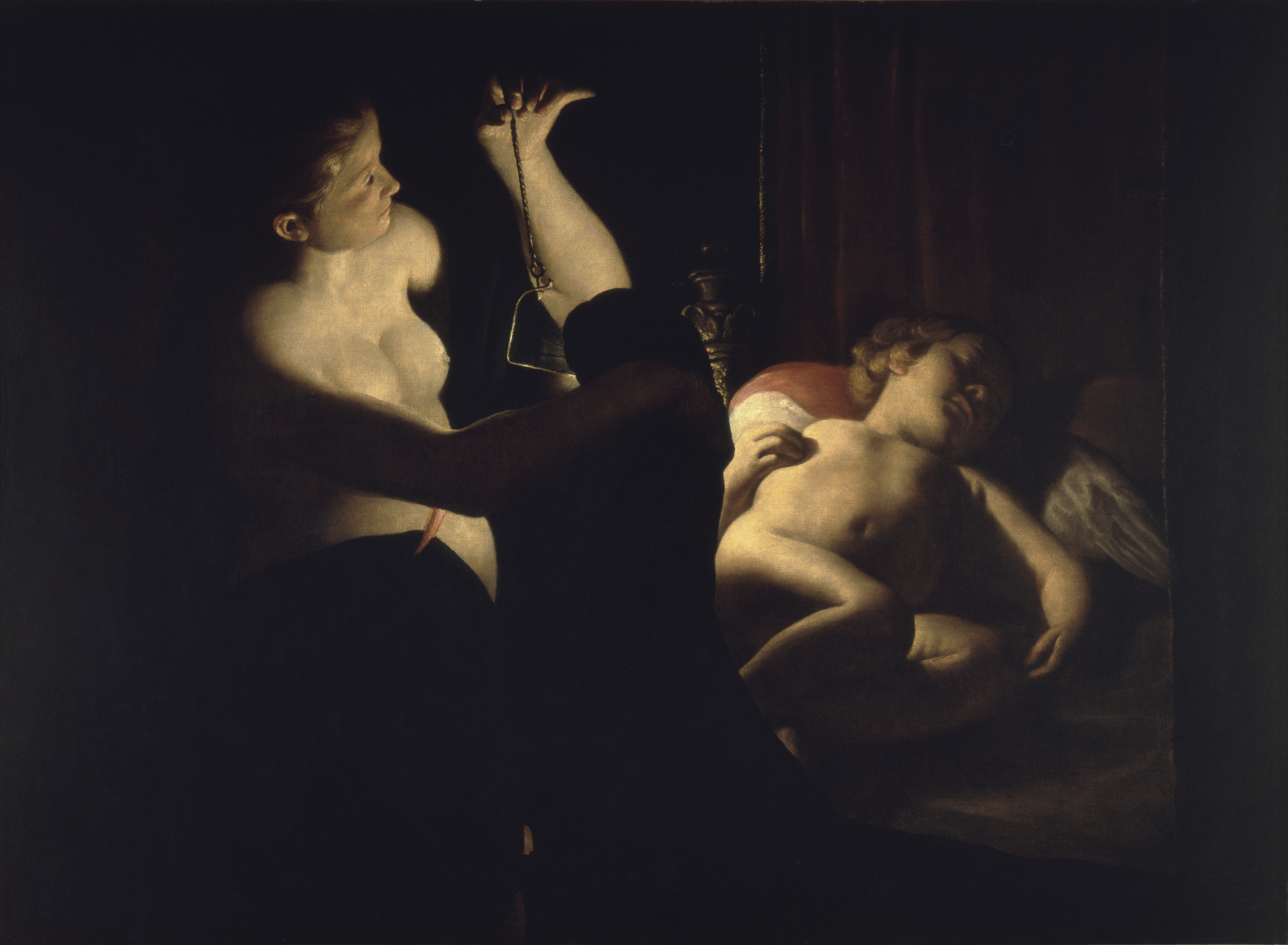
Cupid and Psyche (c. 1638–1642), by Trophime Bigot, Museo Soumaya, Mexico City.

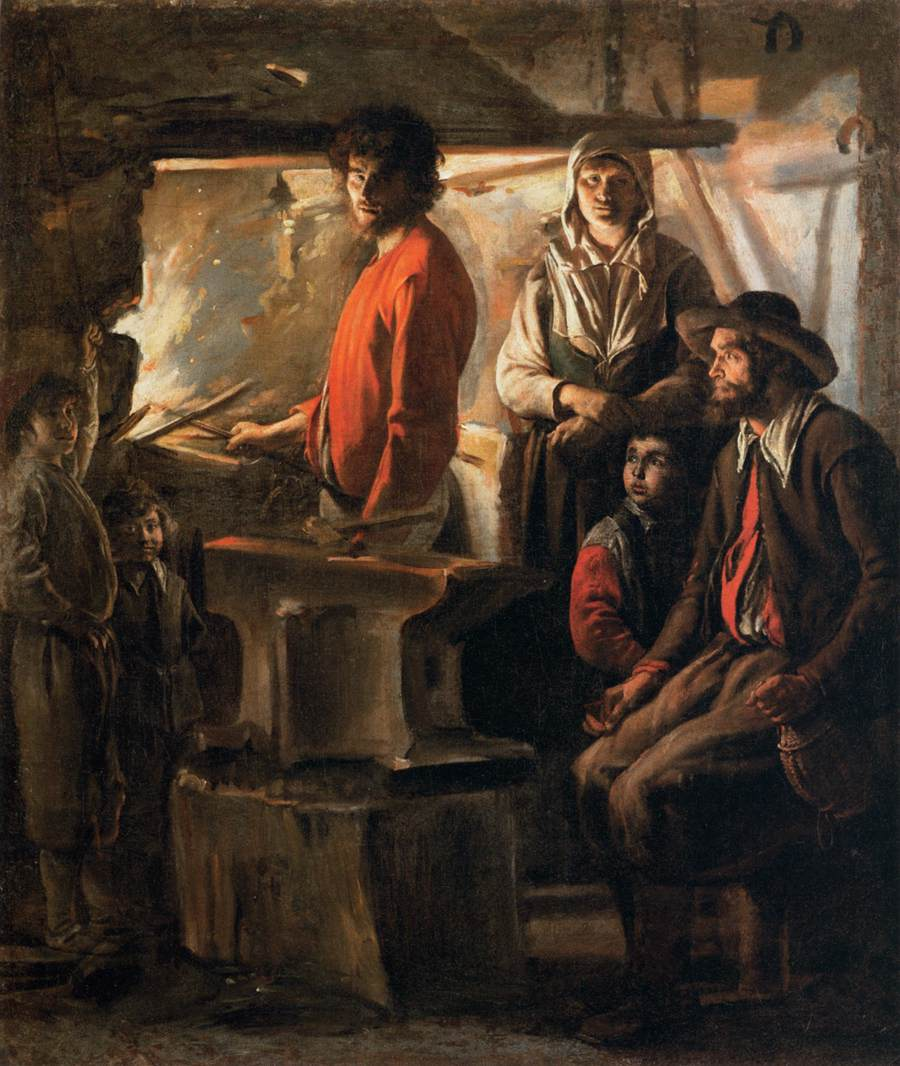
The forge (c. 1640), by Louis Le Nain, Musée du Louvre, Paris

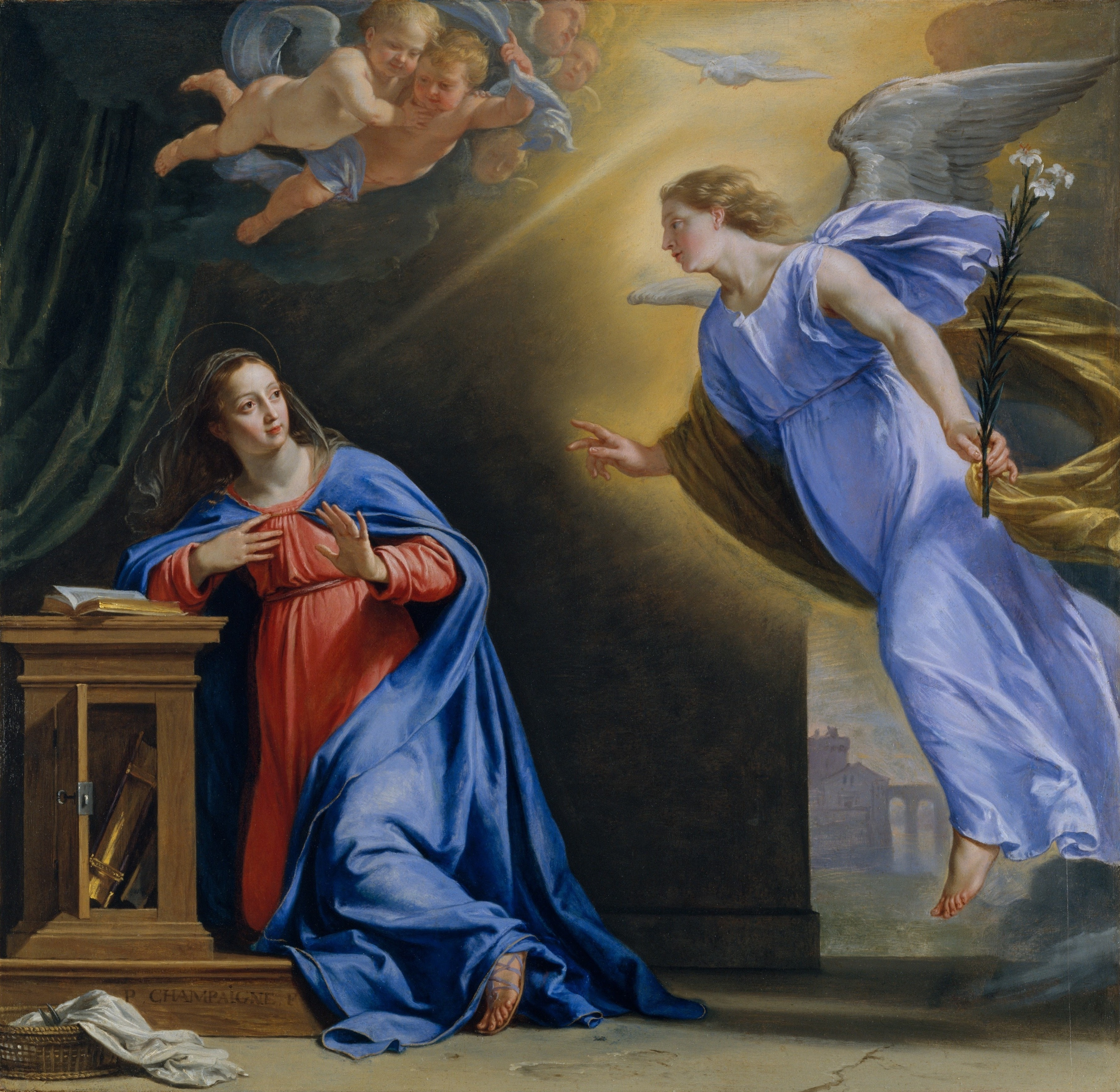
The Annunciation (1644), by Philippe de Champaigne, Metropolitan Museum of Art, New York

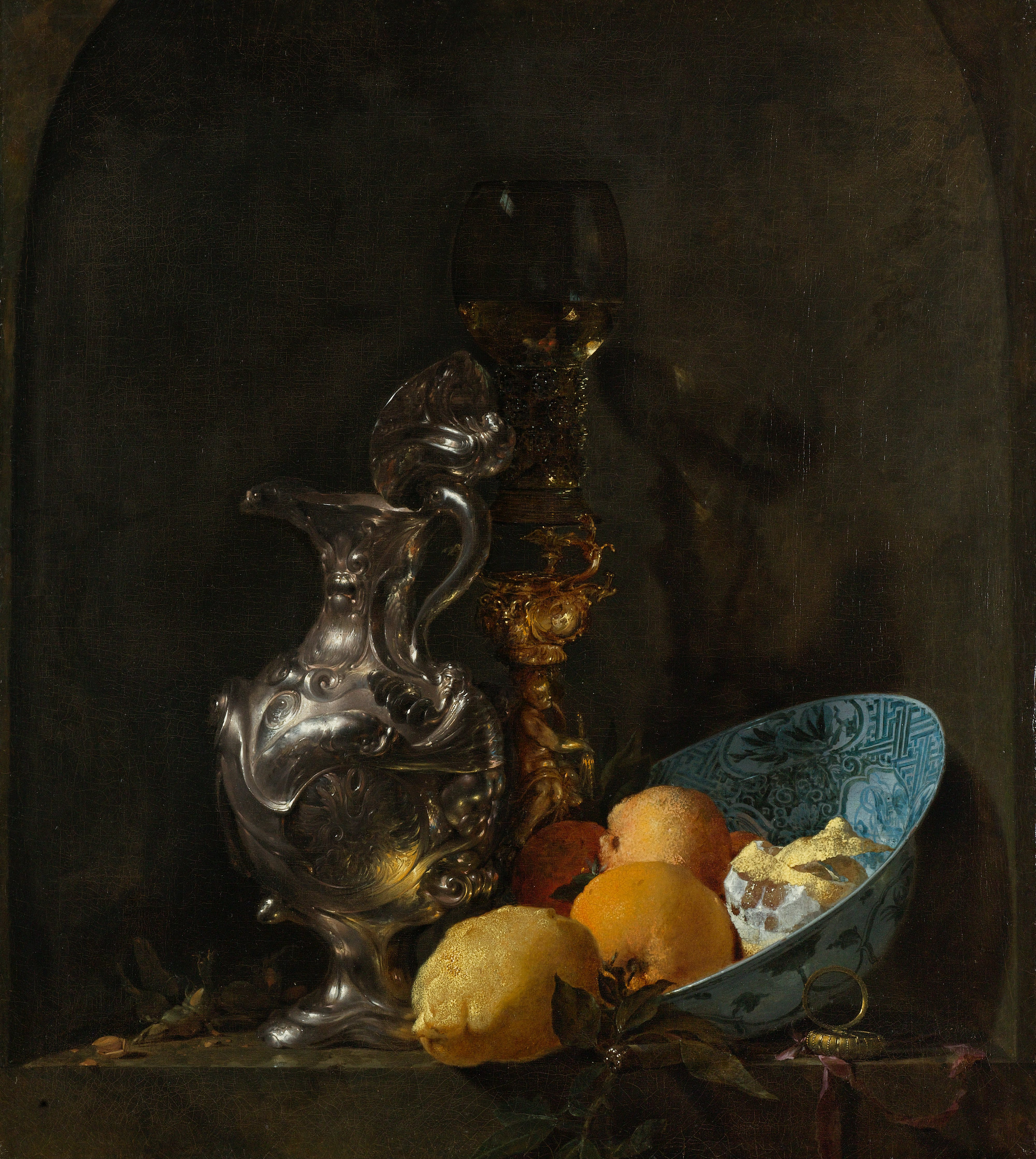
Still life with silver jug (c. 1656), by Willem Kalf, Rijksmuseum, Ámsterdam

===== Classicism and full Baroque =====
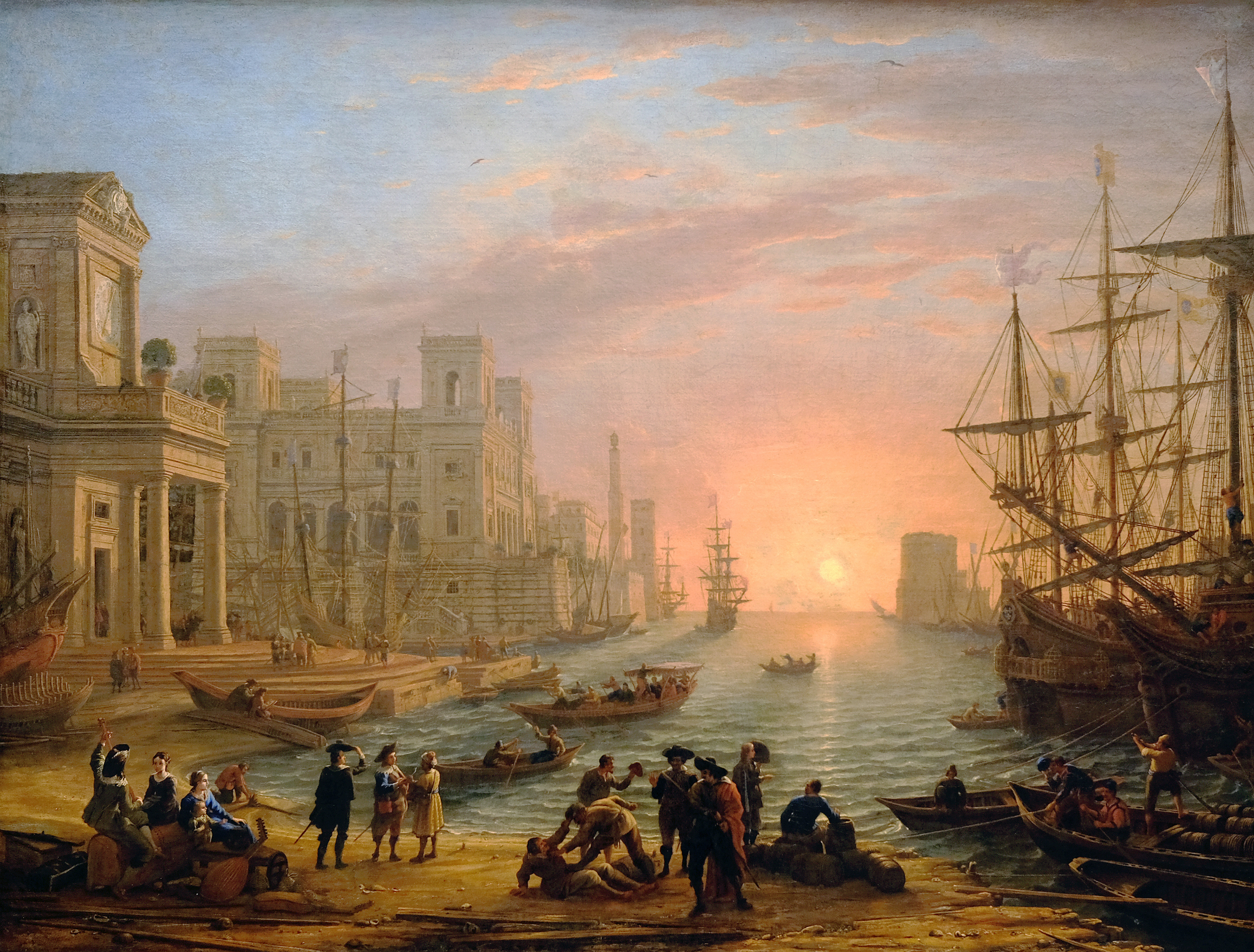
Sunset on a harbor (1639), by Claude Lorrain, Musée du Louvre, Paris

Classicism emerged in Bologna with the Bolognese School, led by Annibale and Agostino Carracci. It arose as a reaction against Mannerism, seeking an idealized vision of nature based on Greco-Roman and Renaissance models. Its aim was ideal beauty, often expressed through landscapes and historical or mythological subjects. Other key figures included Guido Reni, Domenichino, Francesco Albani, Guercino and Giovanni Lanfranco.

In classicism, light plays a central compositional role, though with varied approaches. One current favored decorative effects, with bright tones and broad luminous spaces (Reni, Lanfranco, Guercino). Another developed landscape painting along two lines: a more structured, scenographic style (exemplified by Nicolas Poussin and Domenichino), and a more lyrical approach focused on light, represented by Claude Lorrain.

Claude Lorrain gave light a fundamental role, both as a structural and aesthetic element. He used natural sunlight—often at dawn or sunset—placed centrally to organize space, create depth, and unify the composition. His diffuse, serene light establishes atmosphere and harmony, softening contours and guiding the viewer’s gaze, often toward a luminous horizon. Compared to the more dramatic lighting of Rembrandt or Jacob van Ruysdael, Claude’s light is calm and enveloping, prioritizing unity and ideal beauty.

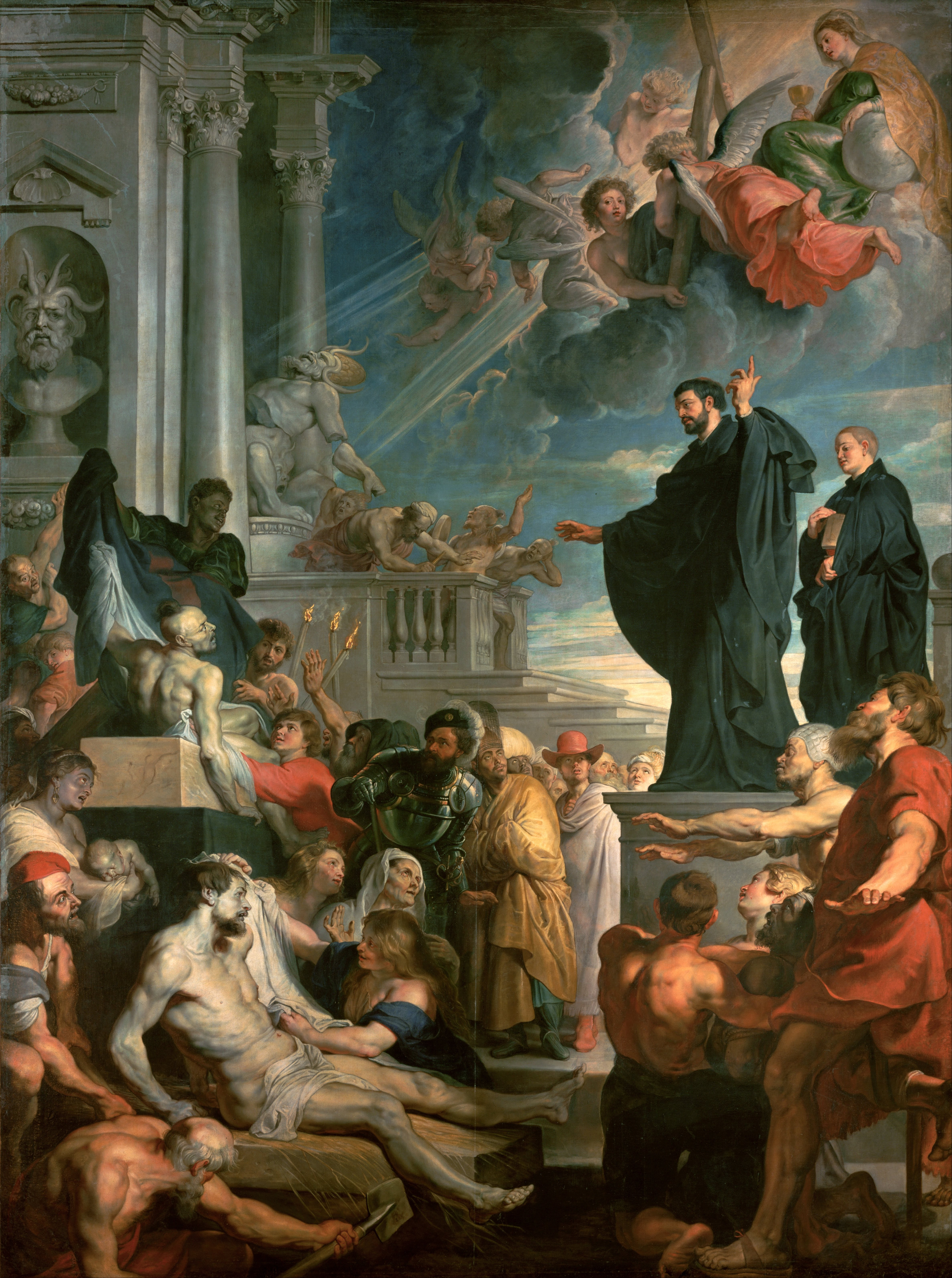
The Miracles of Saint Francis Xavier (1617-1618), by Peter Paul Rubens, Kunsthistorisches Museum, Viena

In Flanders, Peter Paul Rubens represents a synthesis of luminous traditions. Rejecting tenebrist extremes, he developed a dynamic, unified light that integrates figures and space. Influenced initially by Caravaggism, he later adopted brighter tones and emphasized color and movement, combining Flemish and Venetian elements. His landscapes, especially in later years, display vibrant light and color, influencing later artists such as Eugène Delacroix and Pierre-Auguste Renoir.

In Spain, Diego Velázquez achieved a profound synthesis of light and space. His work evolves from early tenebrism to a luminous, atmospheric style in which light permeates a continuous space, dissolving contours and creating a sense of movement. In Las Meninas, multiple light sources structure the scene, defining and dissolving forms to create a convincing spatial illusion. Velázquez used light not only to model objects but to construct the entire pictorial space, anticipating later developments such as Impressionism.

Las meninas (1656), by Diego Velázquez, Museo del Prado, Madrid

Another major Spanish painter, Bartolomé Esteban Murillo, developed a softer, more luminous style. After an early tenebrist phase, he adopted a serene light with translucent colors, often used in religious subjects such as the Immaculate Conception, where golden light symbolizes the divine. The final phase, known as full Baroque (late 17th to early 18th century), intensified the theatrical and illusionistic qualities of painting, especially in large-scale decorative and ceiling works. Major exponents include Pietro da Cortona, Andrea Pozzo, Giovanni Battista Gaulli (il Baciccio), Luca Giordano and Charles Le Brun. These artists pushed contrasts of light and shadow to their limits while refining transitions between them, creating immersive, scenographic compositions. A notable example is Pozzo’s Glory of Saint Ignatius of Loyola, where radiant light structures the entire composition. In Spain, this decorative Baroque was represented by painters such as Francisco de Herrera, Juan Carreño de Miranda, Claudio Coello and Francisco Ricci.

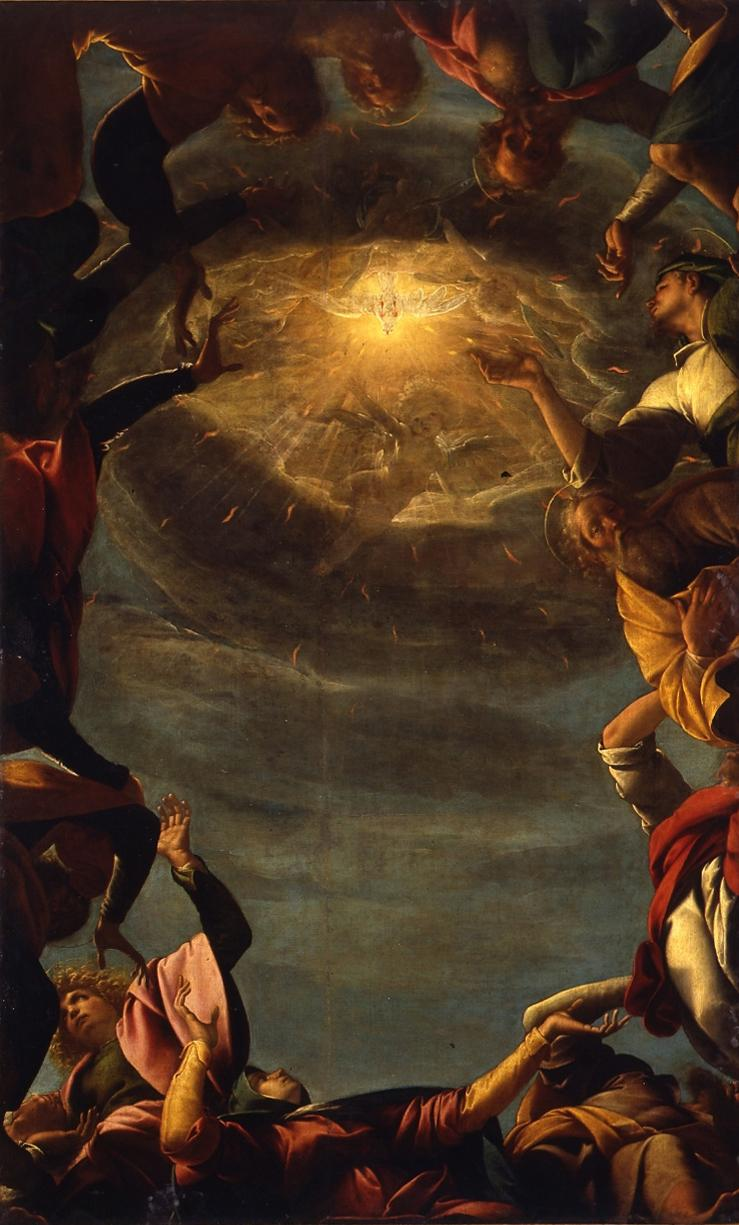
Pentecost (1615), by Pier Francesco Mazzucchelli, Museo d'Arte Antica, Milan

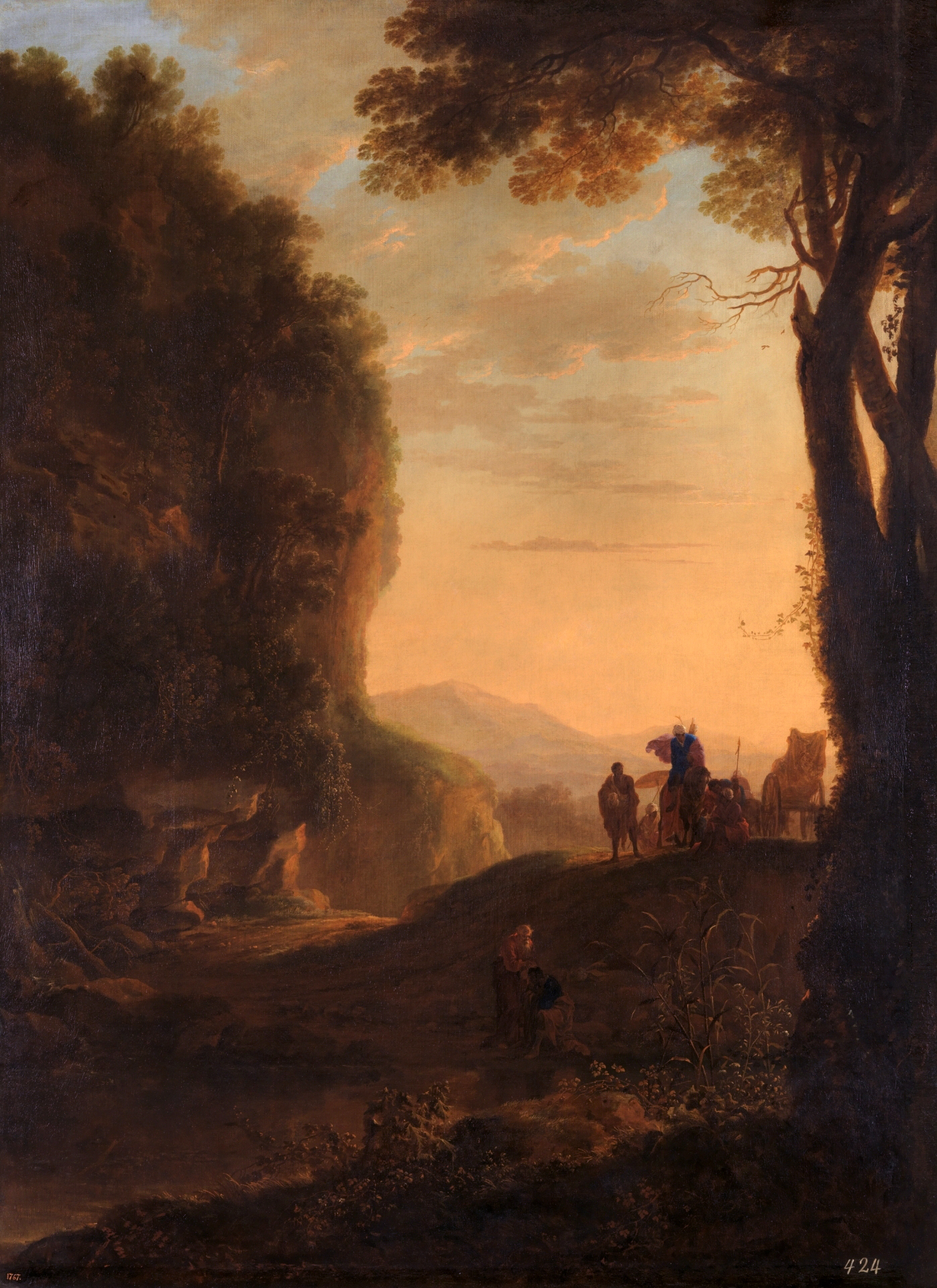
Baptism of the Eunuch of Queen Candace (1640), by Jan Both, Museo del Prado, Madrid

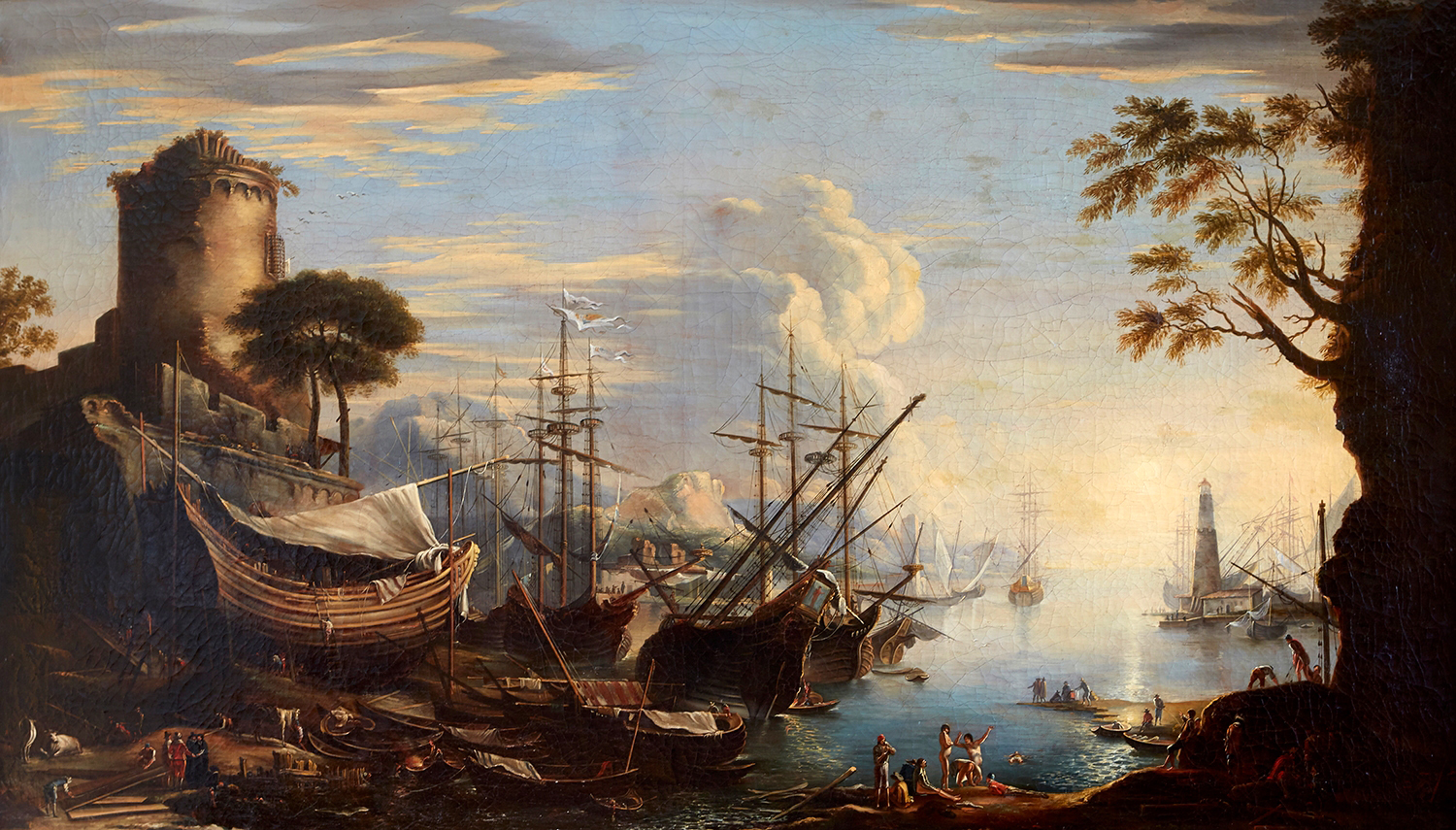
Marina del puerto (1640), by Salvator Rosa, Palazzo Pitti, Florence

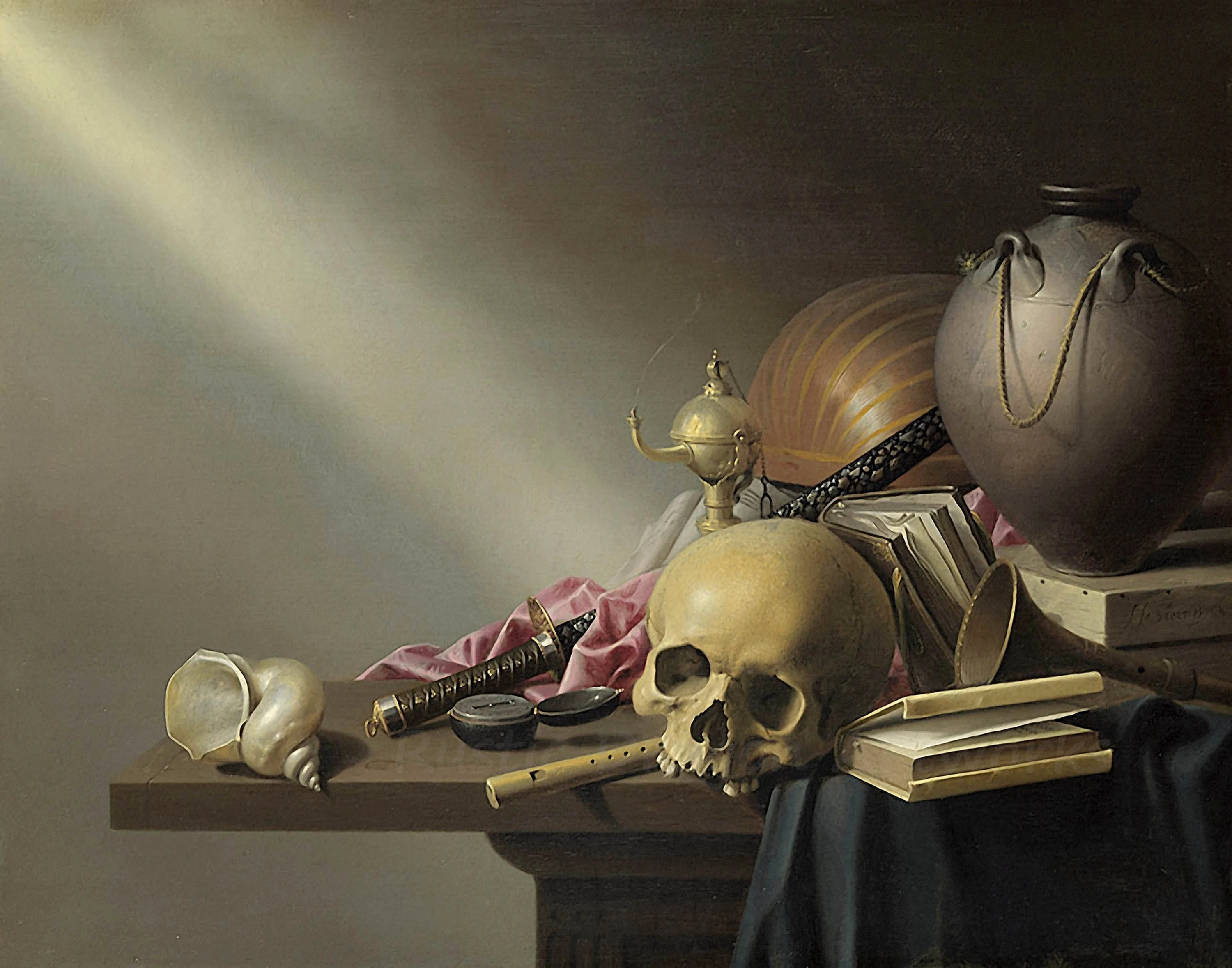
Vanities (1640-1645) by Harmen Steenwijck, The National Gallery, London

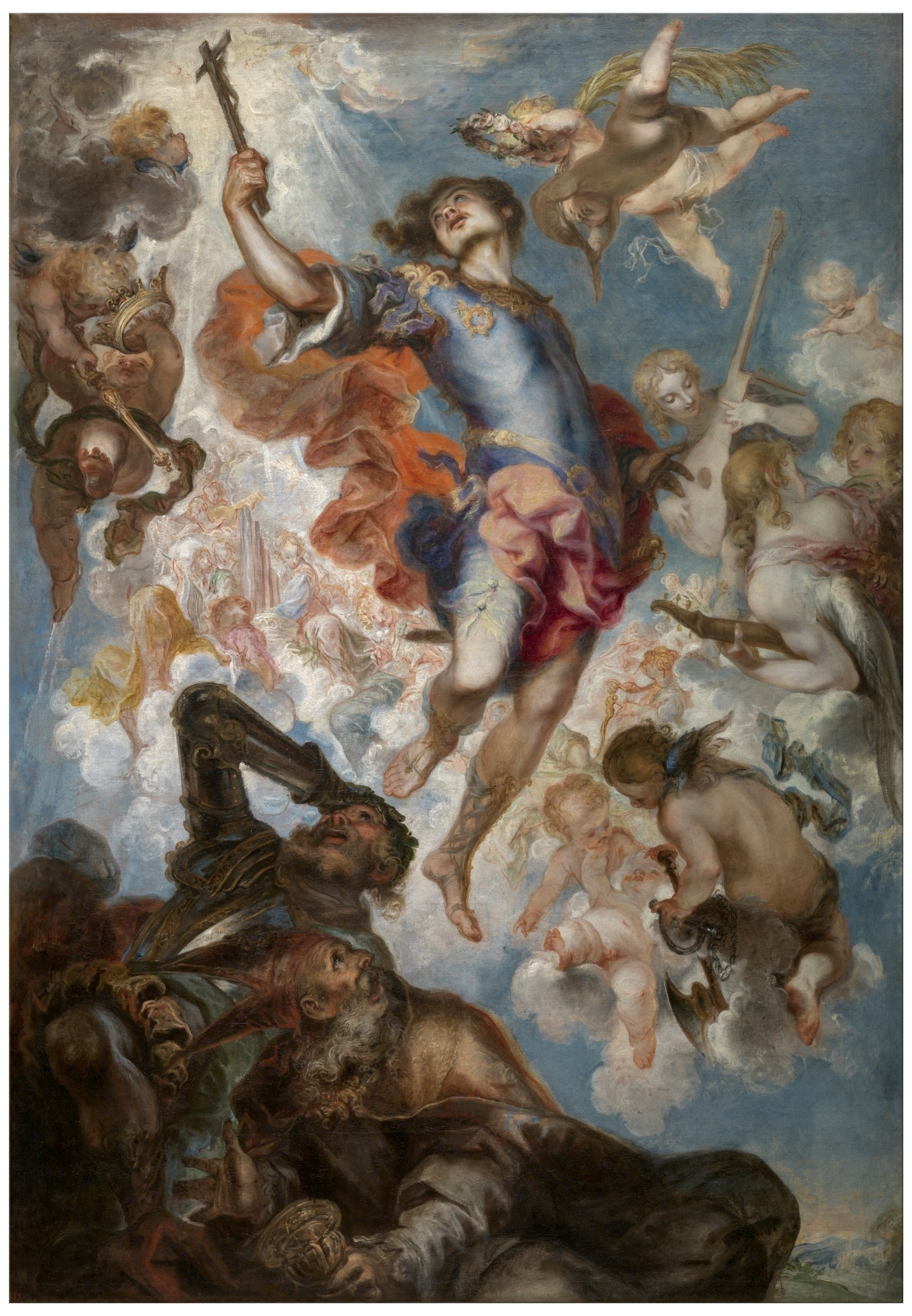
The Triumph of Saint Hermenegildo (1654), by Francisco Herrera the Younger, Museo del Prado, Madrid.

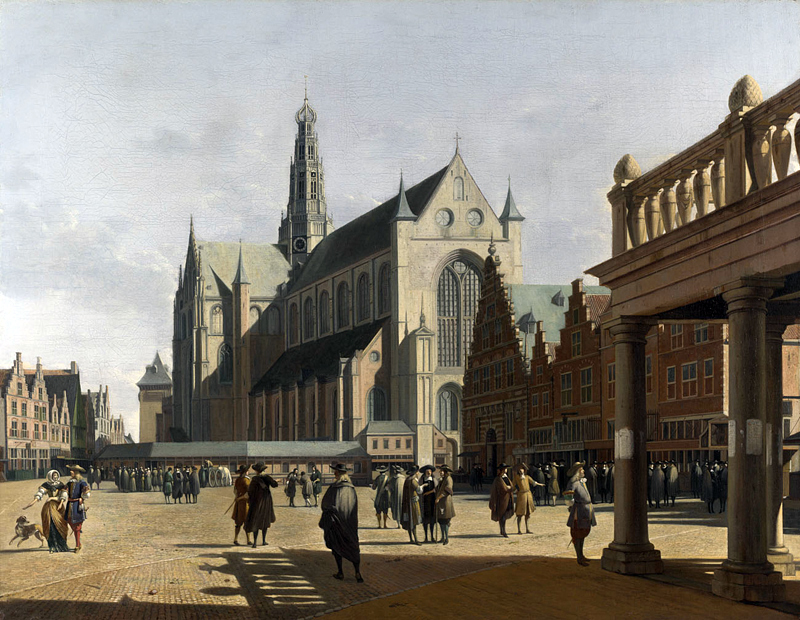
The Market Square and the Grote Kerk in Haarlem (1674), by Gerrit Berckheyde, The National Gallery, London

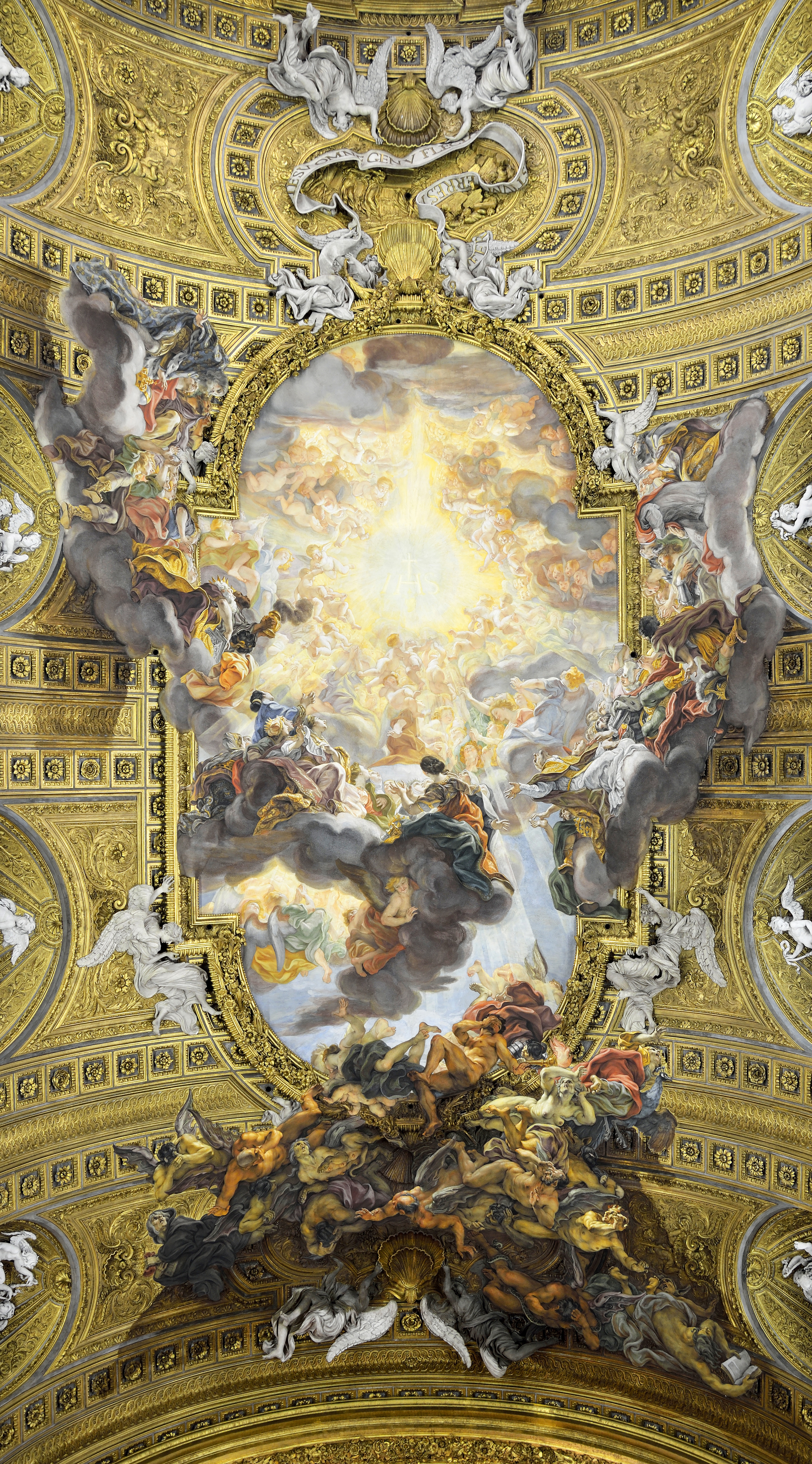
Triumph of the Name of Jesus (1674-1679), by Giovanni Battista Gaulli, Church of the Gesù, Rome.

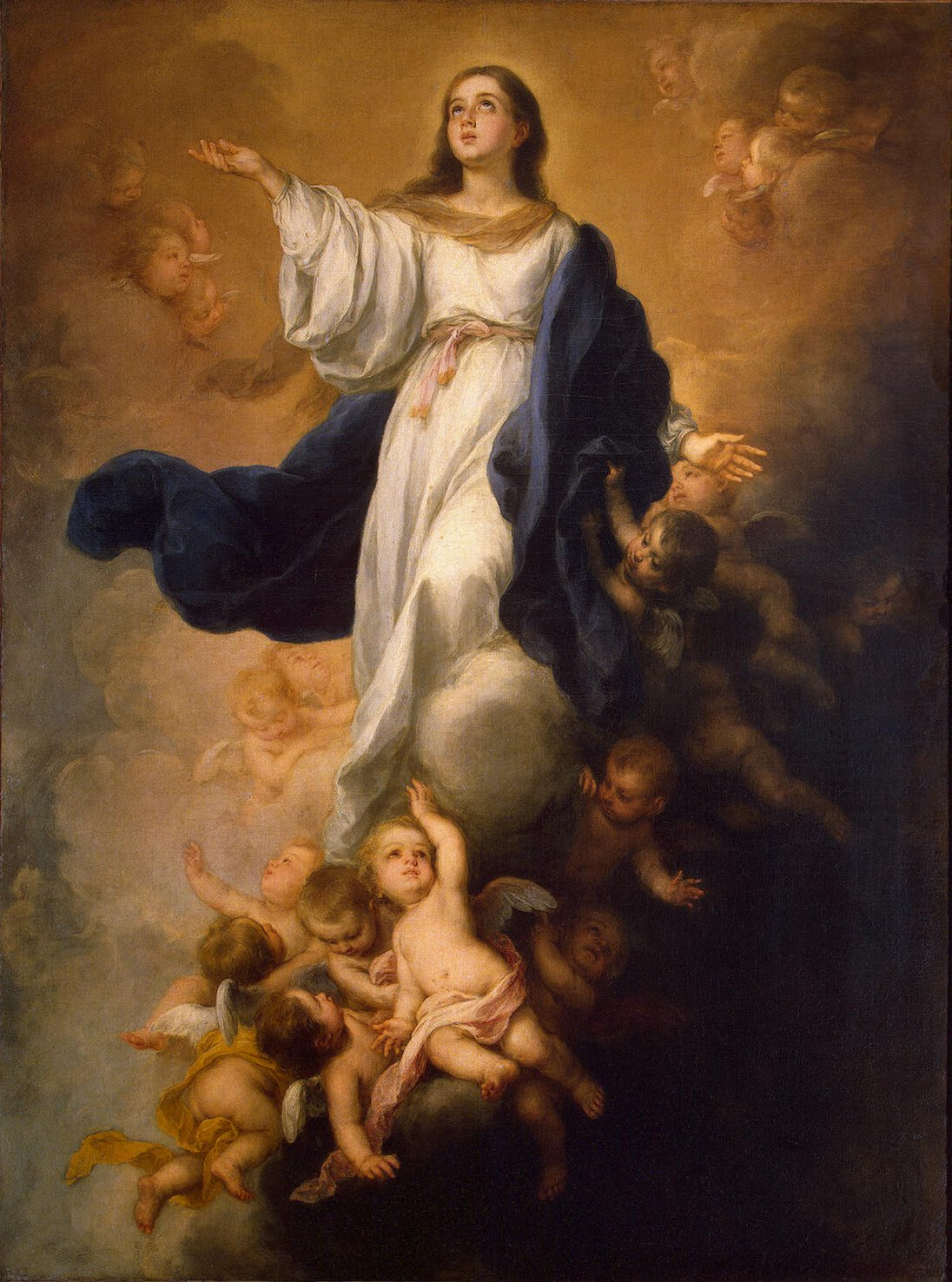
Immaculate Conception (1680), by Bartolomé Esteban Murillo, Hermitage Museum, St. Petersburg

==== 18th Century ====
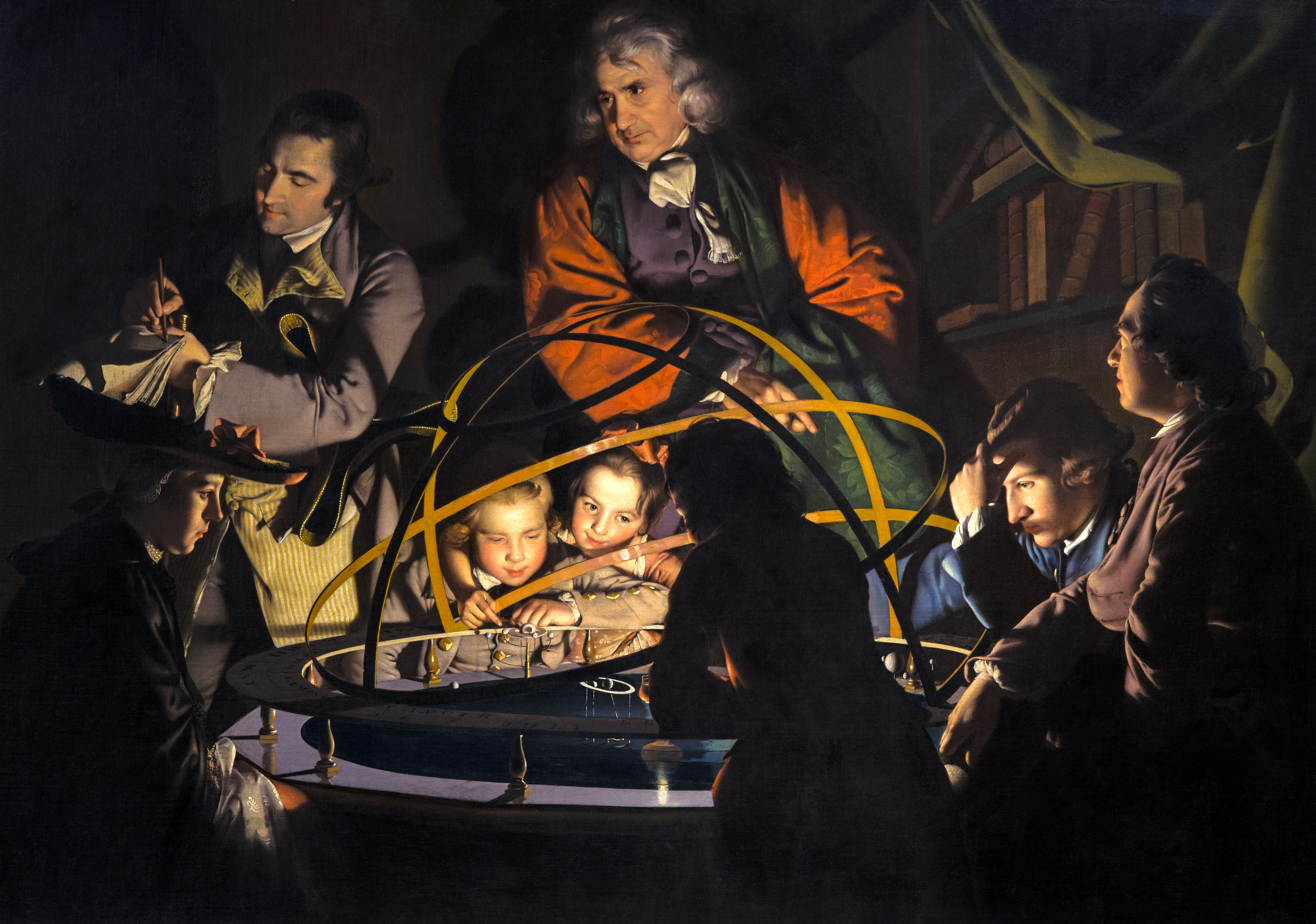
A philosopher gives a lesson on the table-top planetarium (1766), by Joseph Wright, Derby Museum and Art Gallery, Derby

The 18th century, known as the Enlightenment, was marked by the rise of reason and science and by a growing autonomy of art, which shifted from religious and political functions toward the expression of the artist’s sensibility. Stylistically, it oscillated between the decorative exuberance of Rococo and the sobriety of Neoclassicism.

Art academies multiplied across Europe, institutionalizing artistic training and promoting a classical canon. Alongside this, scientific interest in optics led to systematic studies of light and shadow. Thinkers such as Denis Diderot and Jean le Rond d'Alembert, through the Encyclopédie, classified types of shadows and light sources, while theorists like Claude-Henri Watelet and Francesco Algarotti analyzed pictorial light. Pierre-Henri de Valenciennes emphasized the study of light at different times of day, and Antonio Palomino defined light as the essential principle of painting.

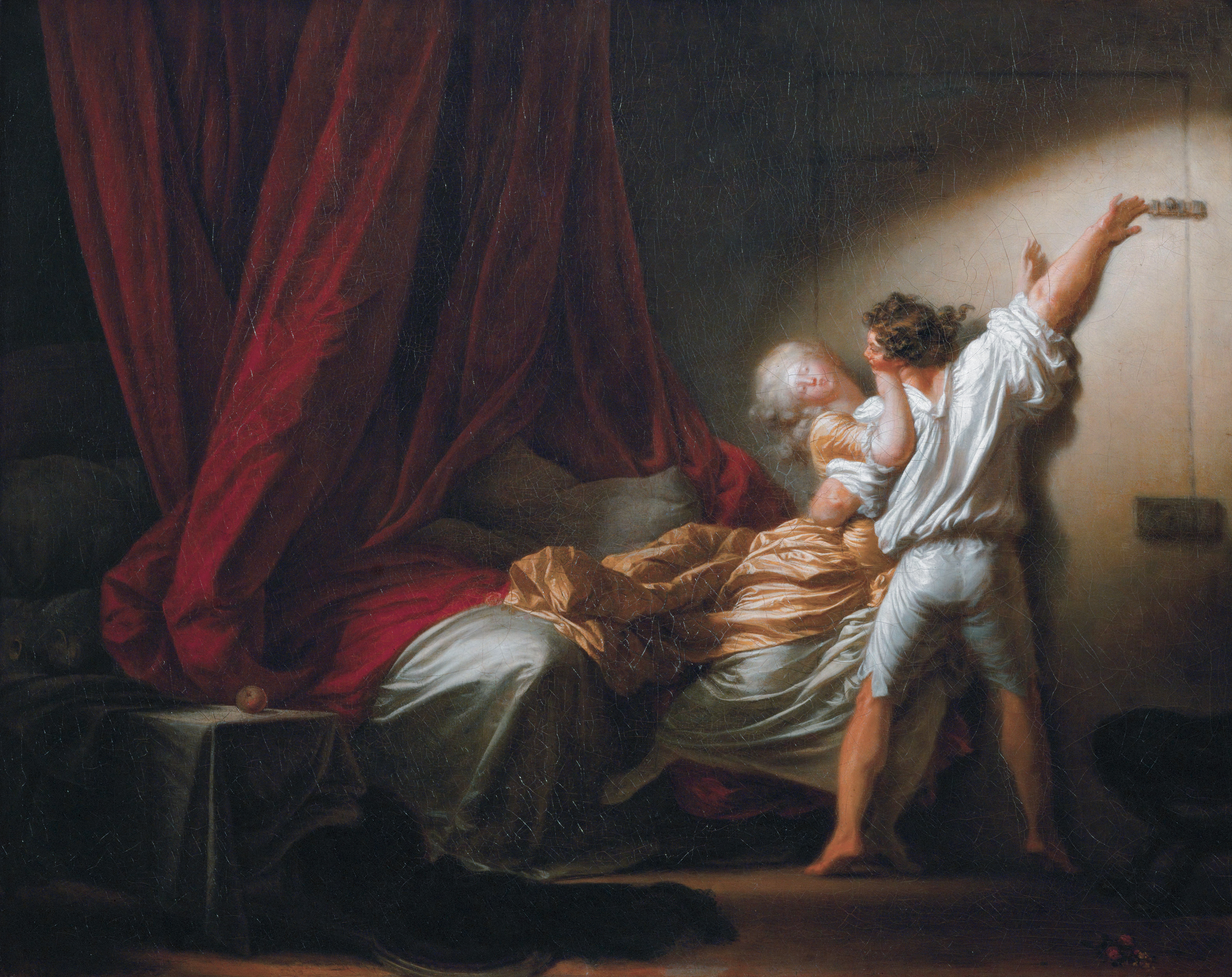
The Latch (1777), by Jean-Honoré Fragonard, Musée du Louvre, Paris

Rococo painting, especially in France, developed a luminous, elegant style centered on pleasure and ornament. Artists such as Jean-Antoine Watteau, François Boucher and Jean-Honoré Fragonard favored soft daylight, delicate tones, and idyllic settings. In still life, Jean-Baptiste-Siméon Chardin stood out for his subtle treatment of light, creating intimate atmospheres through soft gradations.

In Venice, vedutismo developed as a genre of detailed urban views with careful attention to atmospheric light. Canaletto achieved great precision—often using the camera obscura—while Francesco Guardi explored more vibrant and atmospheric effects, anticipating Impressionism.

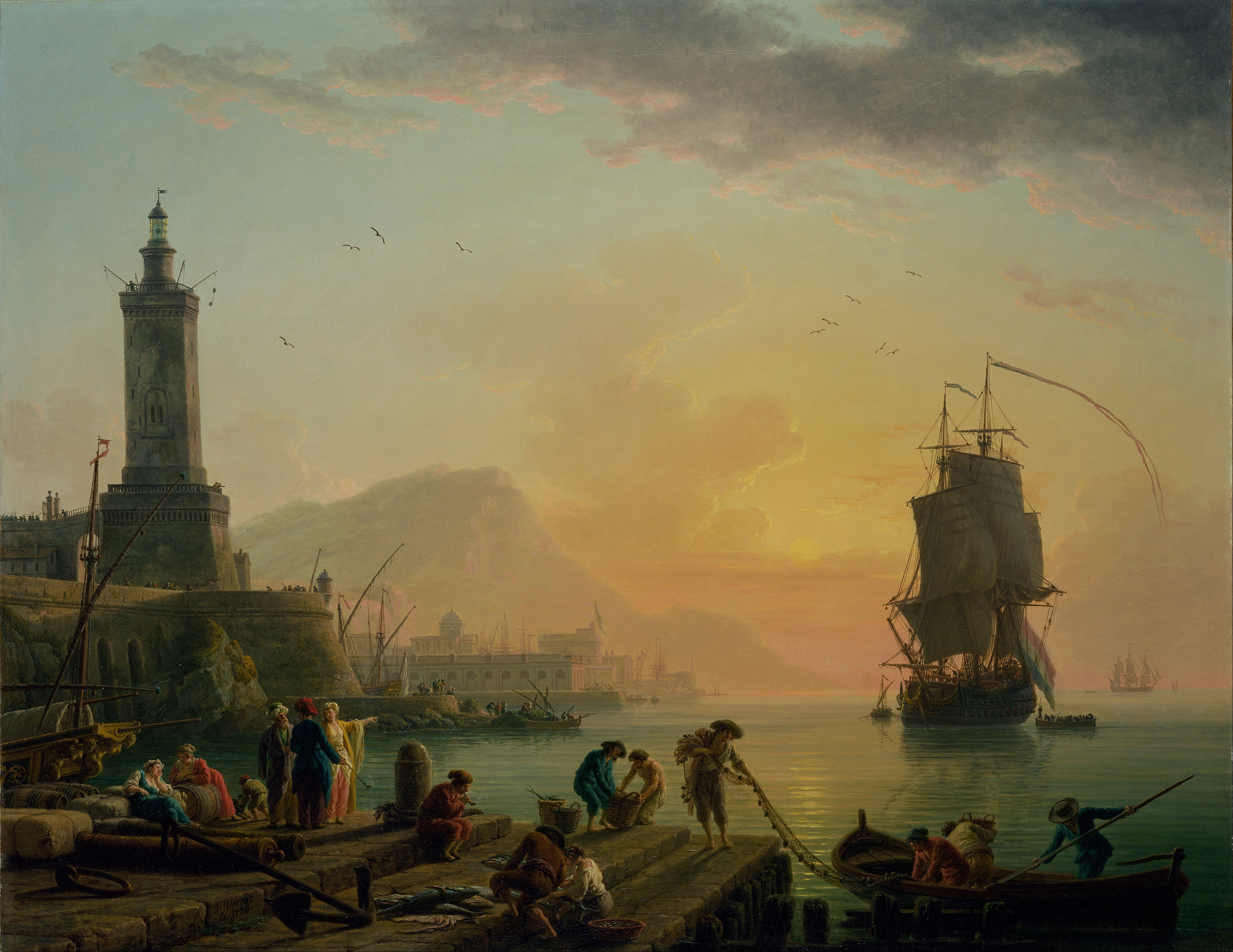
Calm in a Mediterranean Harbour (1770), by Claude Joseph Vernet, The Getty Center, Los Angeles

Landscape painting gained autonomy, incorporating the aesthetics of the picturesque and the sublime. Artists such as Claude Joseph Vernet and Hubert Robert explored atmospheric and emotional effects of light, often in seascapes or ruins. In England, painters like Thomas Gainsborough and Richard Wilson emphasized the observation of natural light and atmosphere.

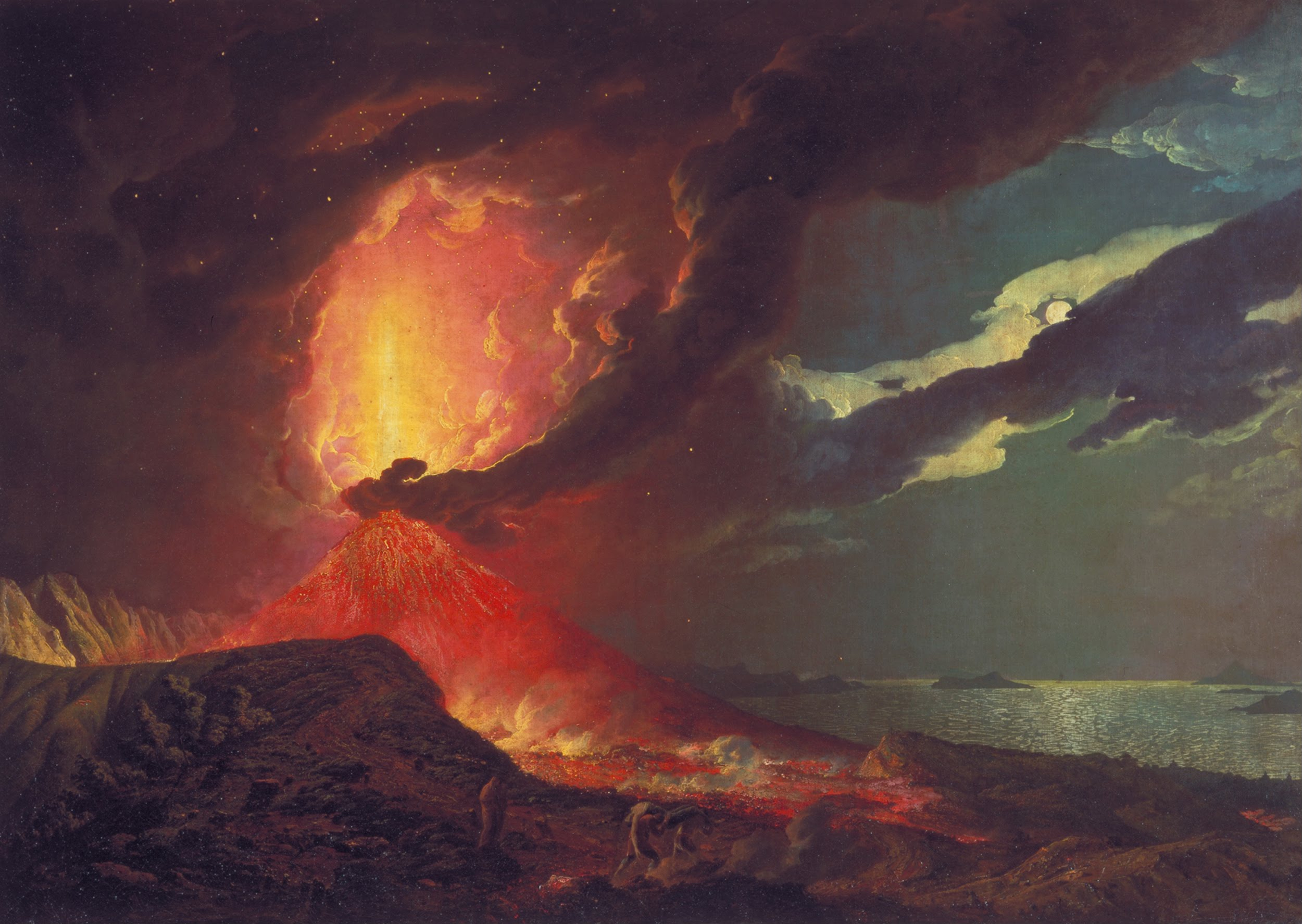
Vesuvius erupting, with a view of the islands in the Bay of Naples (1776), by Joseph Wright of Derby, Tate Britain, London.

A key figure in the study of artificial light was Joseph Wright of Derby, who depicted scientific experiments illuminated by candles. In works such as Experiment with a Bird in an Air Pump, light functions both realistically and symbolically, representing Enlightenment reason and knowledge.

At the turn of the century, Francisco de Goya developed a highly personal use of light. For him, light symbolized reason and freedom, opposed to darkness as ignorance and oppression". In The Third of May 1808, artificial light dramatizes the scene and elevates the central figure into a symbol of martyrdom. His late works, with freer brushwork and light rendered through color, anticipate modern painting.

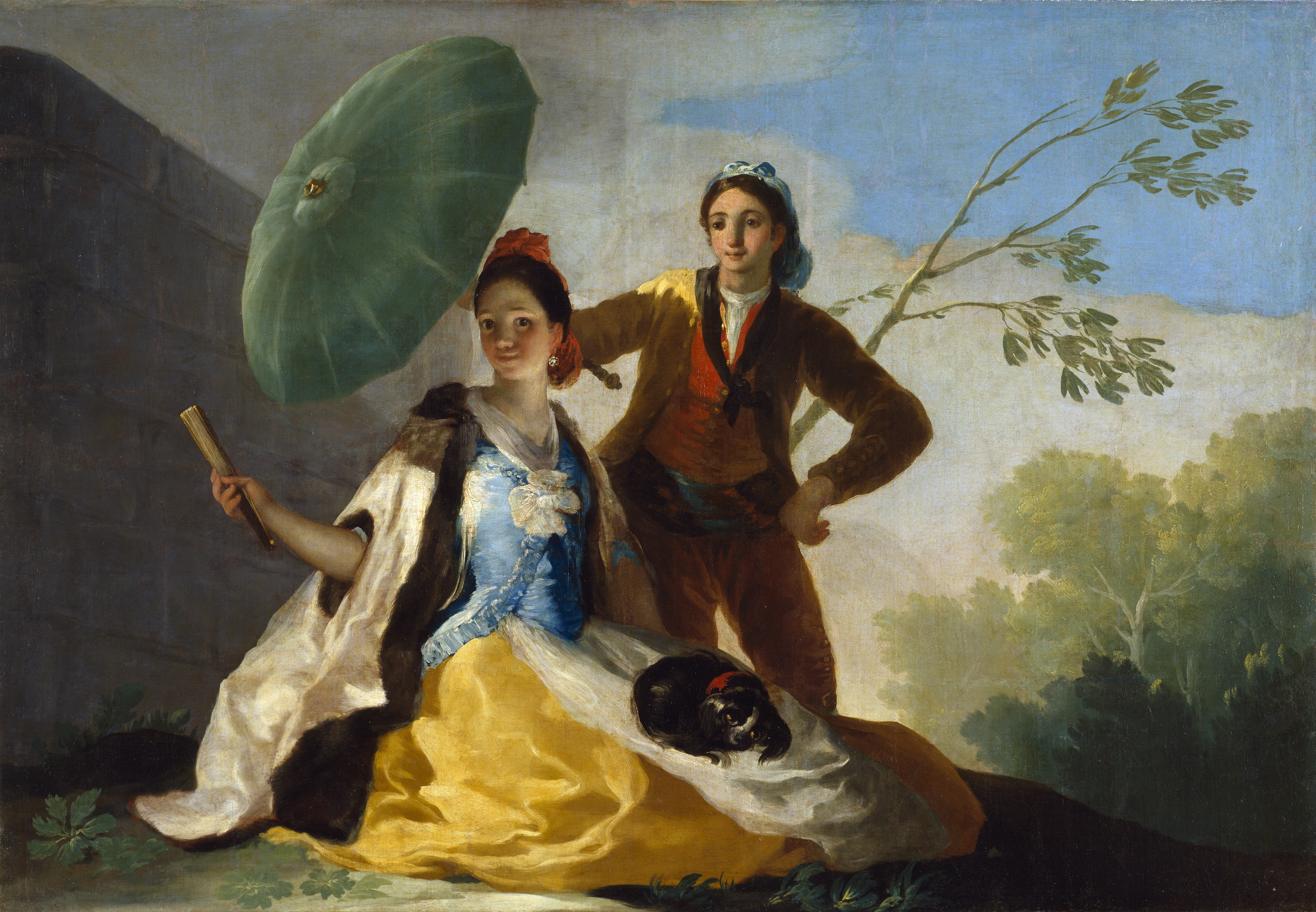
The Sunshade (1777), by Francisco de Goya, Museo del Prado, Madrid

Neoclassicism, emerging after the French Revolution, rejected Rococo ornament in favor of clarity, order, and classical ideals. Influenced by antiquity and artists such as Raphael and Poussin, it emphasized line over color and used a uniform, cool light that reinforced form and solemnity. Its leading figure was Jacques-Louis David, whose works demonstrate controlled lighting and compositional rigor. Other important artists included Anne-Louis Girodet-Trioson and Jean Auguste Dominique Ingres, introduced softer and sometimes more atmospheric effects.

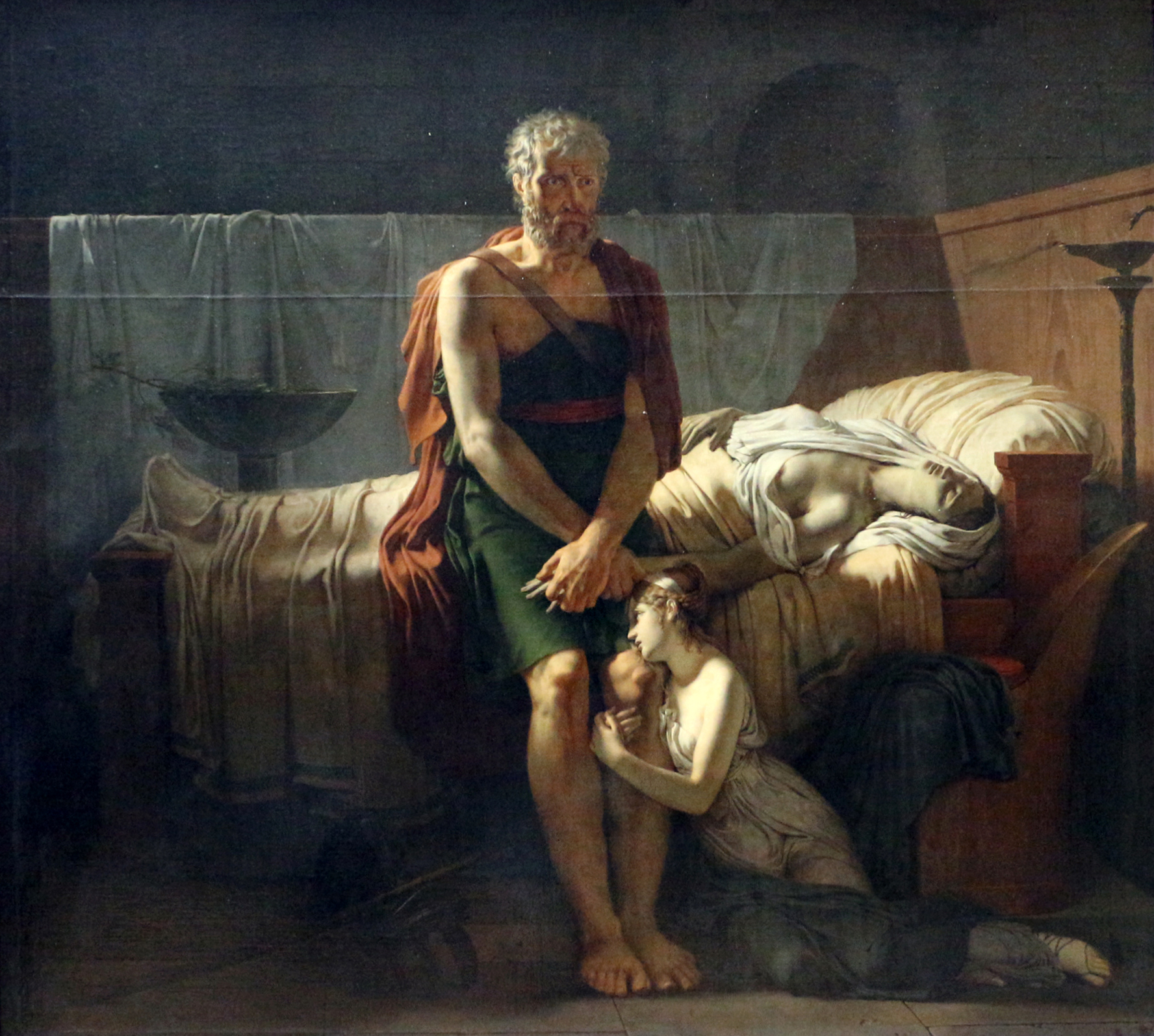
Return of Marcus Sextus (1799), by Pierre-Narcisse Guérin, Musée du Louvre, Paris

Although less central, landscape painting persisted within Neoclassicism, particularly in Germany. Joseph Anton Koch developed idealized landscapes with clear, cold light, while Ferdinand Kobell and Wilhelm von Kobell explored more naturalistic light effects.

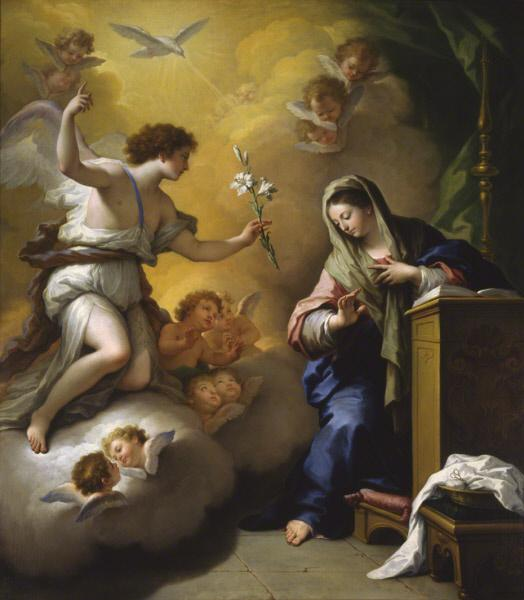
Annunciation (1712), by Paolo de Matteis, Saint Louis Art Museum, Saint Louis, Missouri

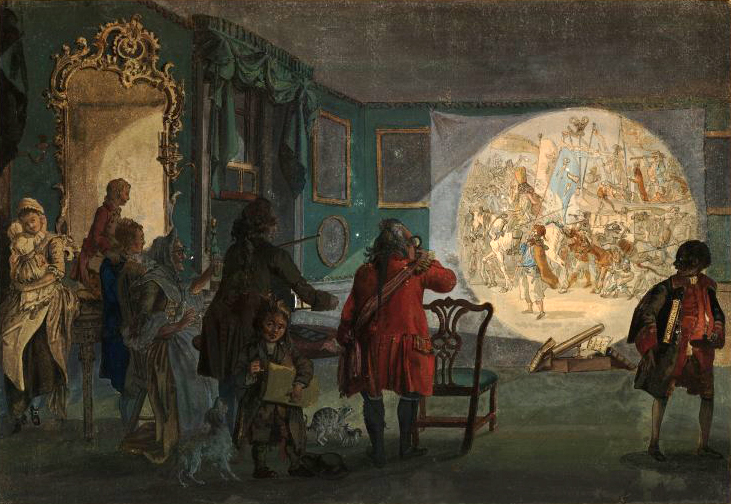
The Magic Lantern (1760), by Paul Sandby, The Trustees of the British Museum, Londres

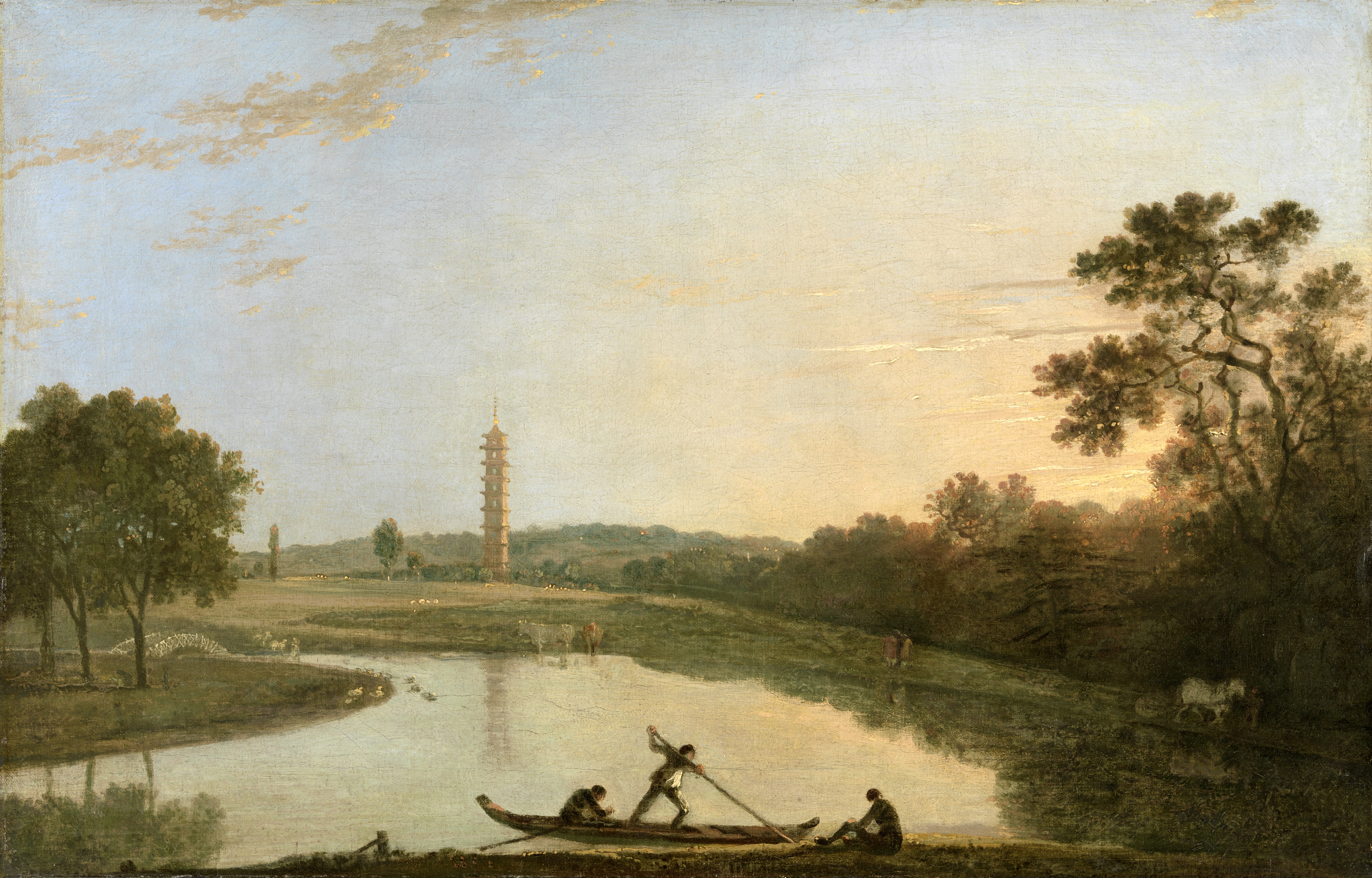
Kew Gardens: The Pagoda and Bridge (1762), by Richard Wilson, Yale Center for British Art, New Haven, Connecticut.

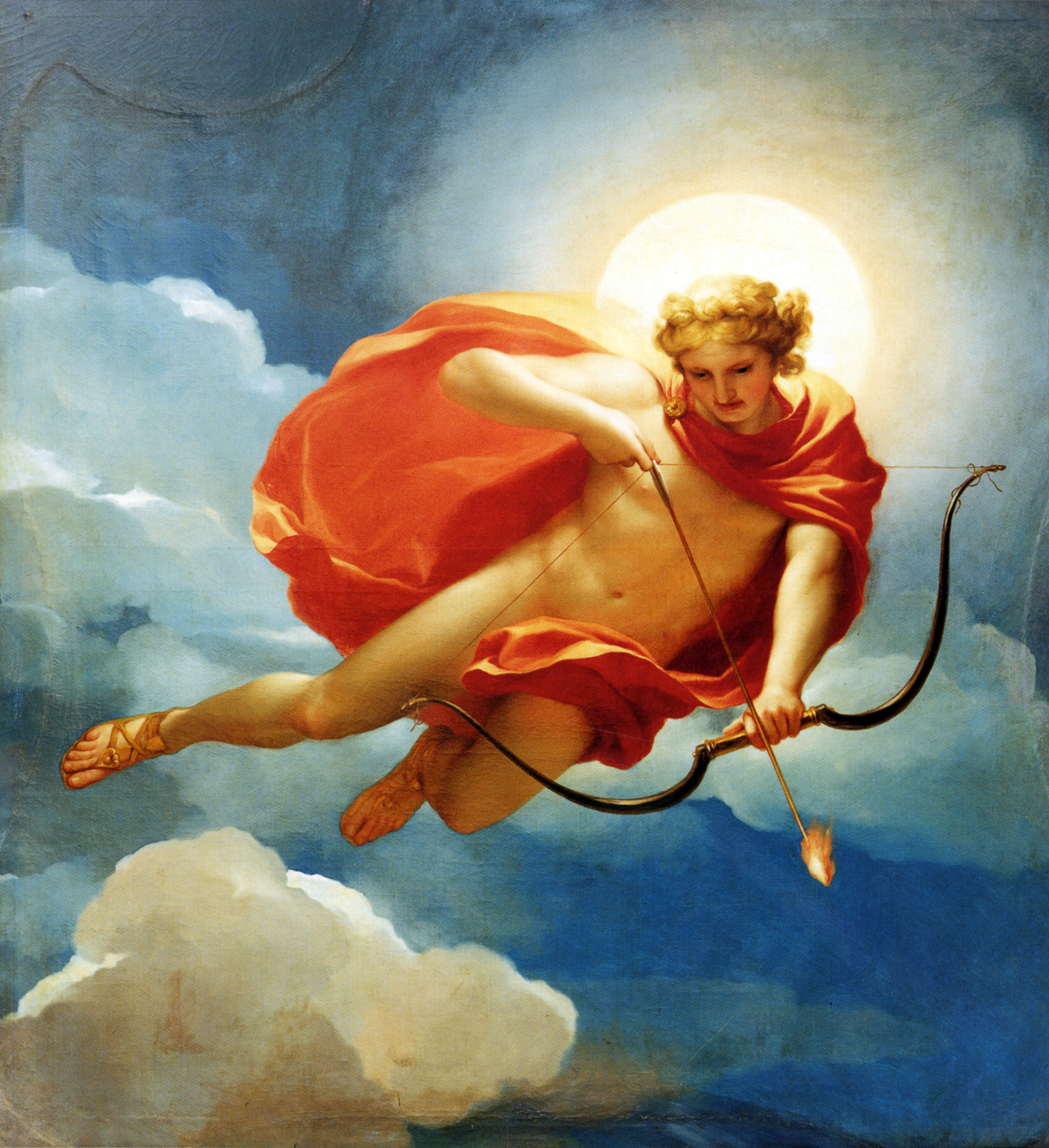
Helios as personification of the Midday (1765), by Anton Raphael Mengs, Palacio de la Moncloa, Madrid

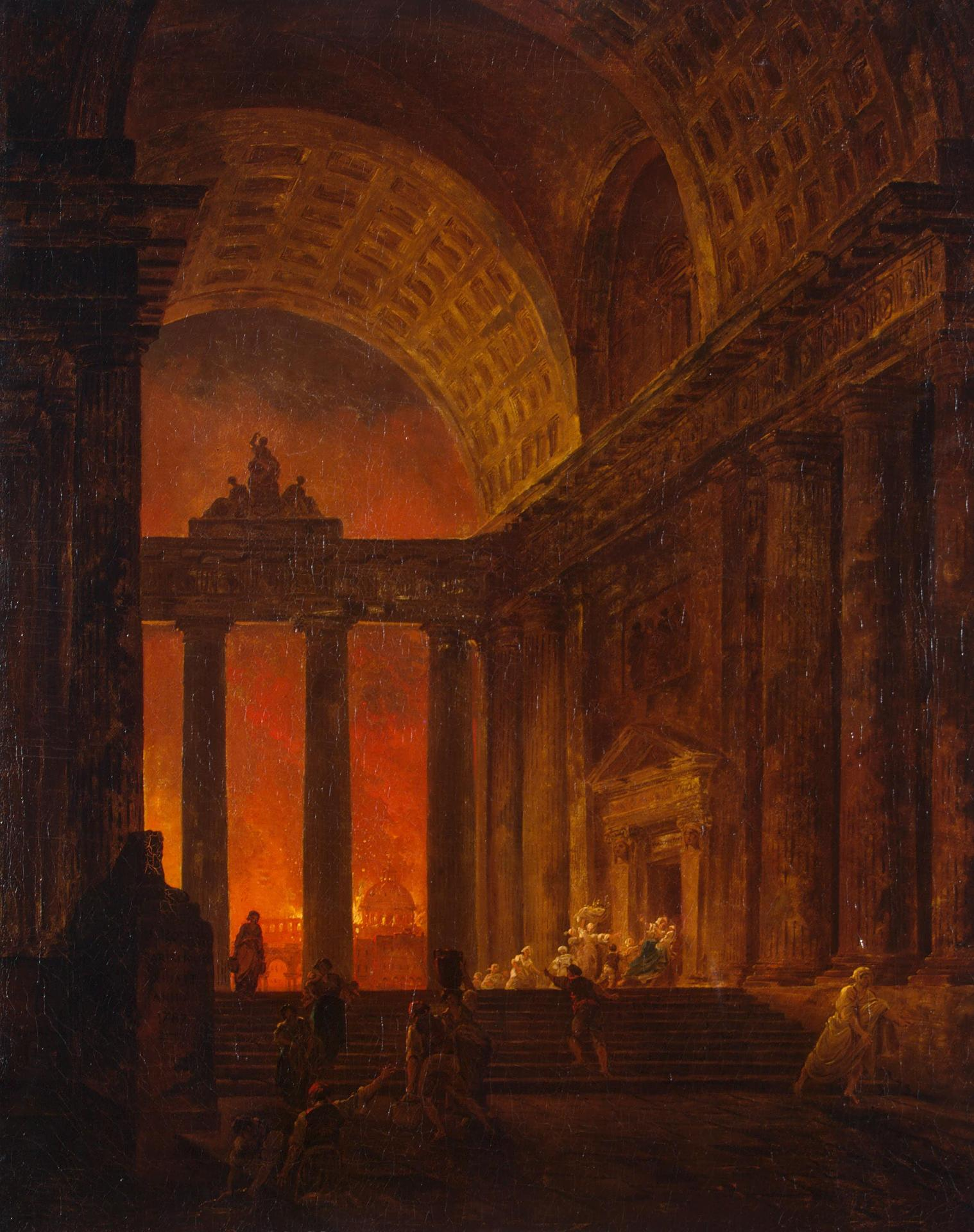
The Fire of Rome (1787), by Hubert Robert, Hermitage Museum, St. Petersburg

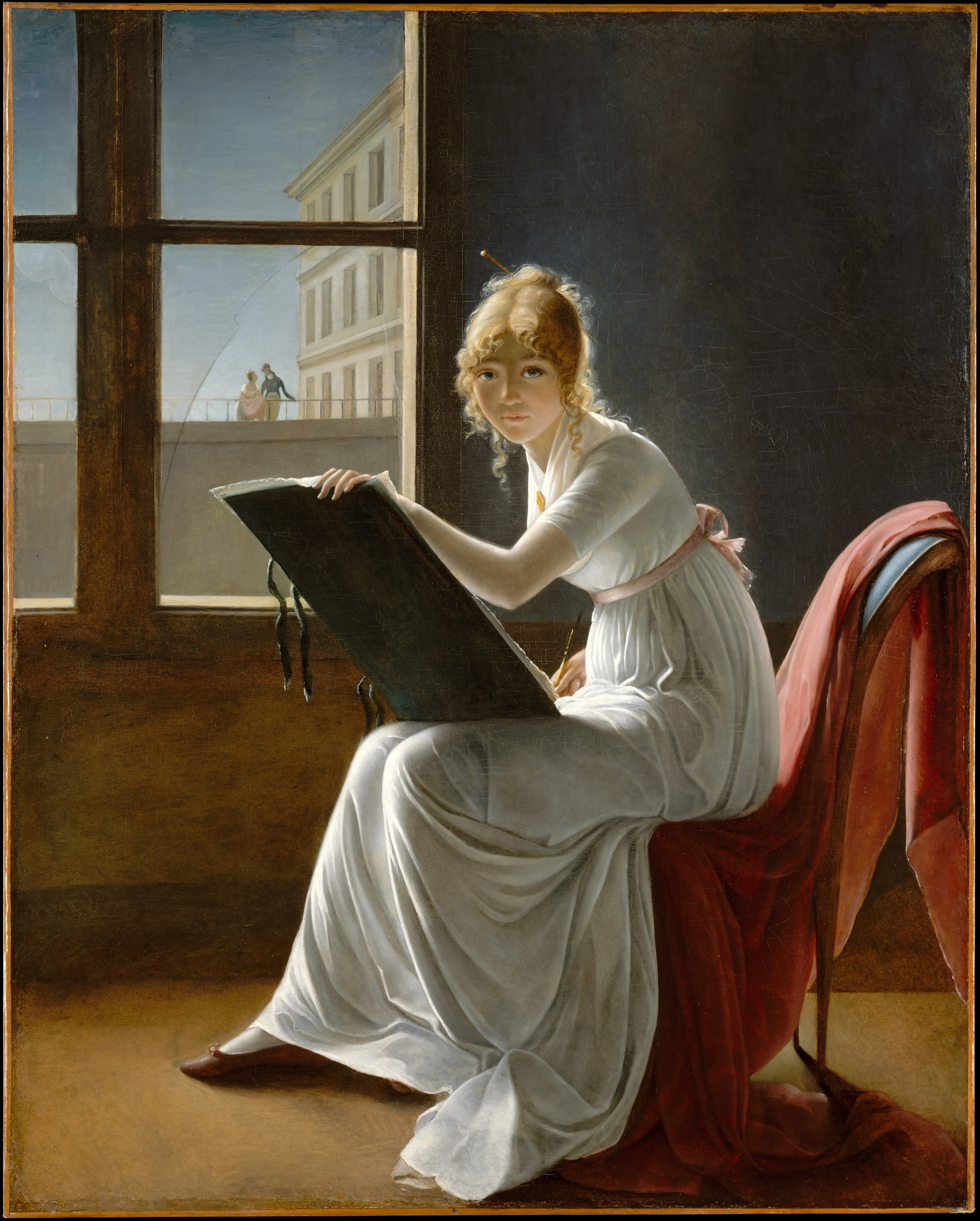
Portrait of Charlotte du Val d'Ognes (1801), by Marie-Denise Villers, Metropolitan Museum of Art, New York

=== Contemporary Art ===
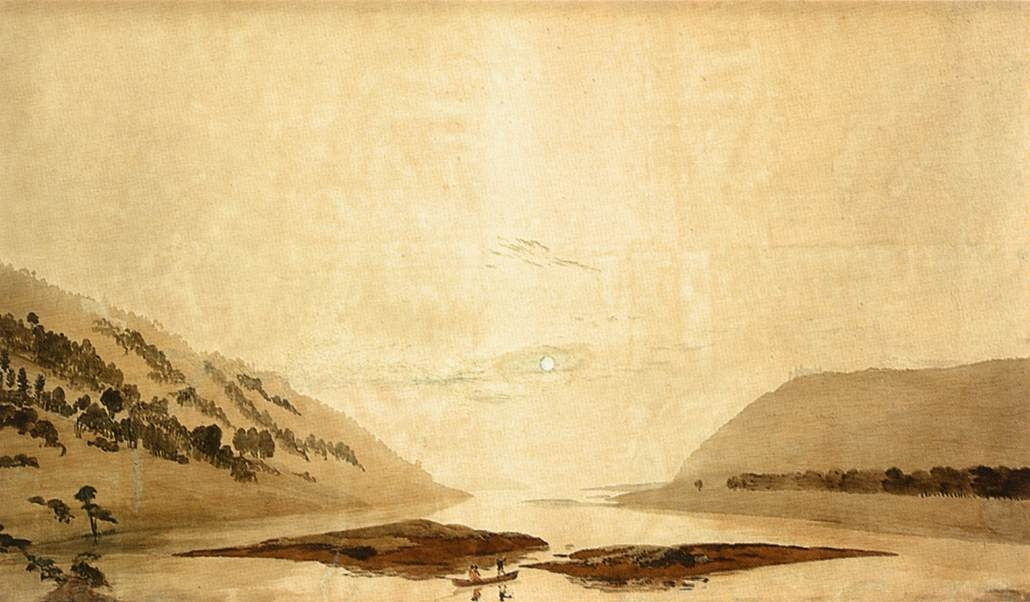
Mountain landscape with river (daytime version) (1830-1835), by Caspar David Friedrich, Staatliche Museen, Kassel

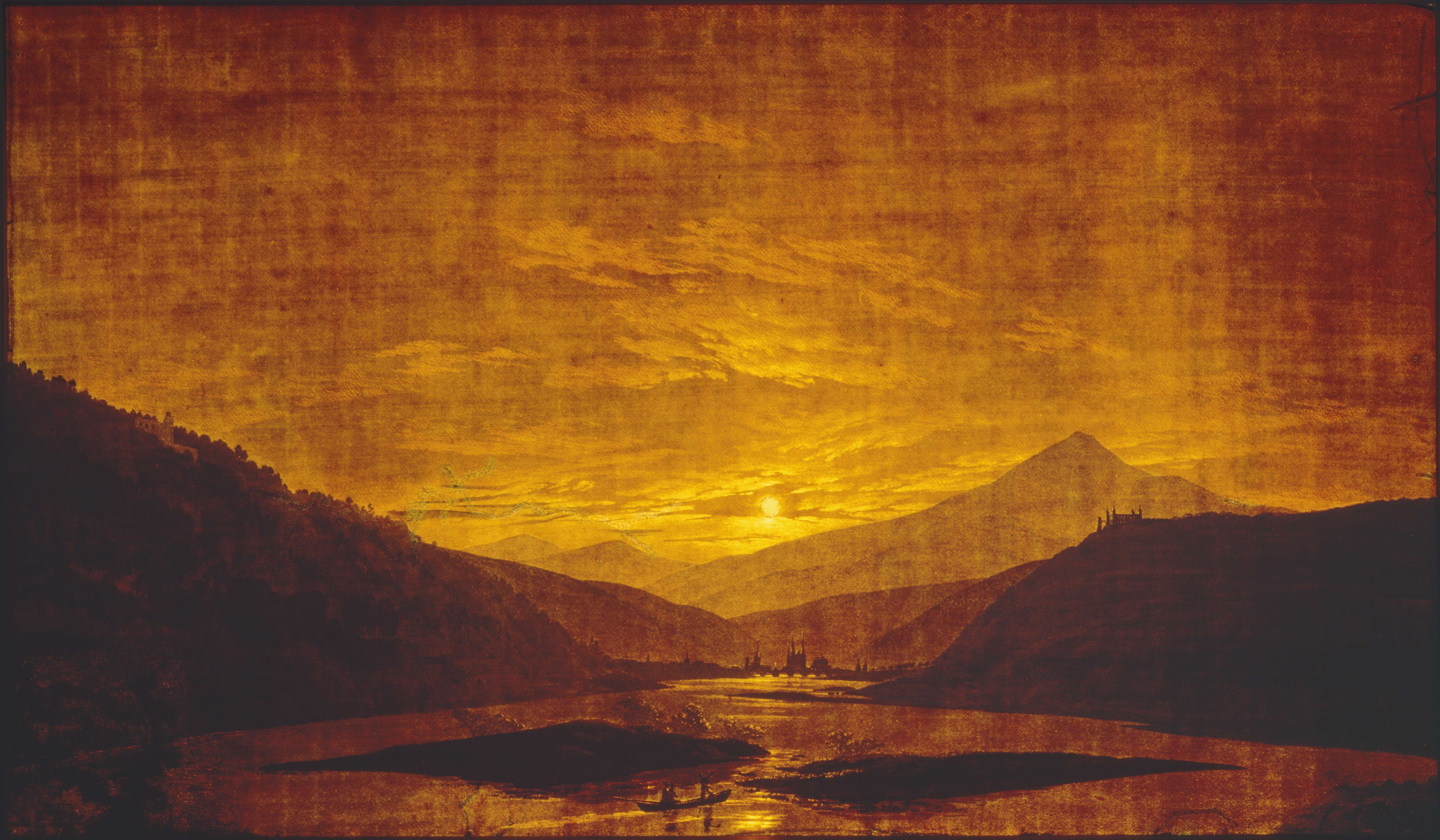
Mountain landscape with river (night version) (1830-1835), by Caspar David Friedrich, Staatliche Museen, Kassel

==== 19th Century ====
In the 19th century began an evolutionary dynamic of styles that followed one another chronologically with increasing speed and modern art emerged as opposed to academic art, where the artist is at the forefront of the cultural evolution of humanity. The study of light was enriched with the appearance of photography and with new technological advances in artificial light, thanks to the appearance of gaslight at the beginning of the century, kerosene in the middle of the century and electricity at the end of the century. These two phenomena brought about a new awareness of light, as this element configures the visual appearance, changing the concept of reality from the tangible to the perceptible.

===== Romanticism =====
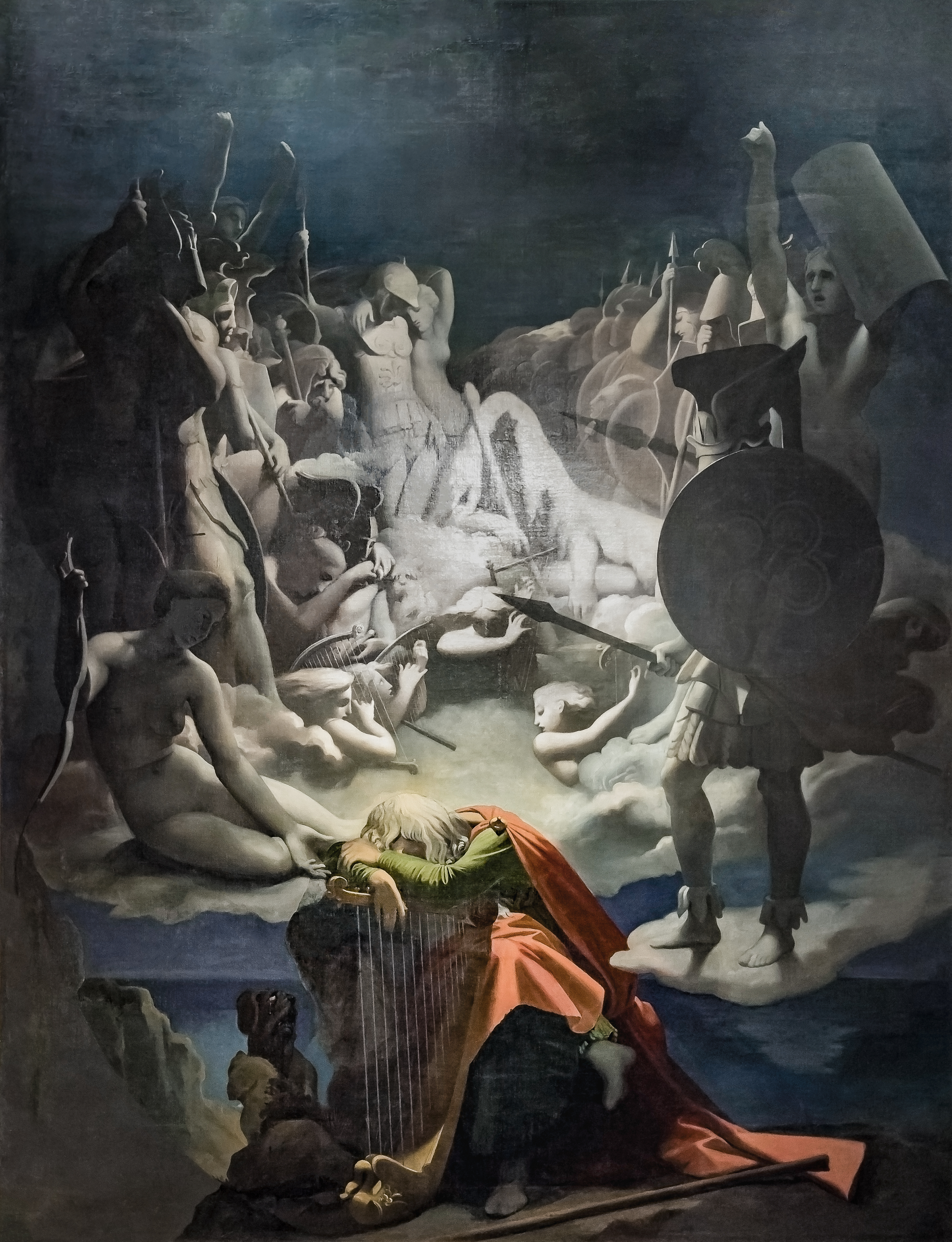
The Dream of Ossian (1813), by Dominique Ingres, Ingres Museum, Montauban

Romanticism, the first major movement of the 19th century, introduced a profound renewal of art, emphasizing emotion, imagination, and individual expression. It valued nature, the sublime, and the irrational—dreams, madness, and the occult—while elevating the artist as a “genius” whose work arises spontaneously from inner feeling. Landscape became a central genre, and technique grew more expressive through impasto and glazes.

Precursors include William Blake, whose visionary images feature unreal, twilight light, and Henry Fuseli, who employed theatrical contrasts of light and shadow in dreamlike scenes.

Among early Romantic painters, Théodore Géricault stands out, notably in The Raft of the Medusa, where a beam of light symbolizes hope amid tragedy. The leading French Romantic Eugène Delacroix, conceived painting as a dynamic interplay of color and light, influenced by Rubens and by John Constable, whose work revealed new possibilities for atmospheric light.

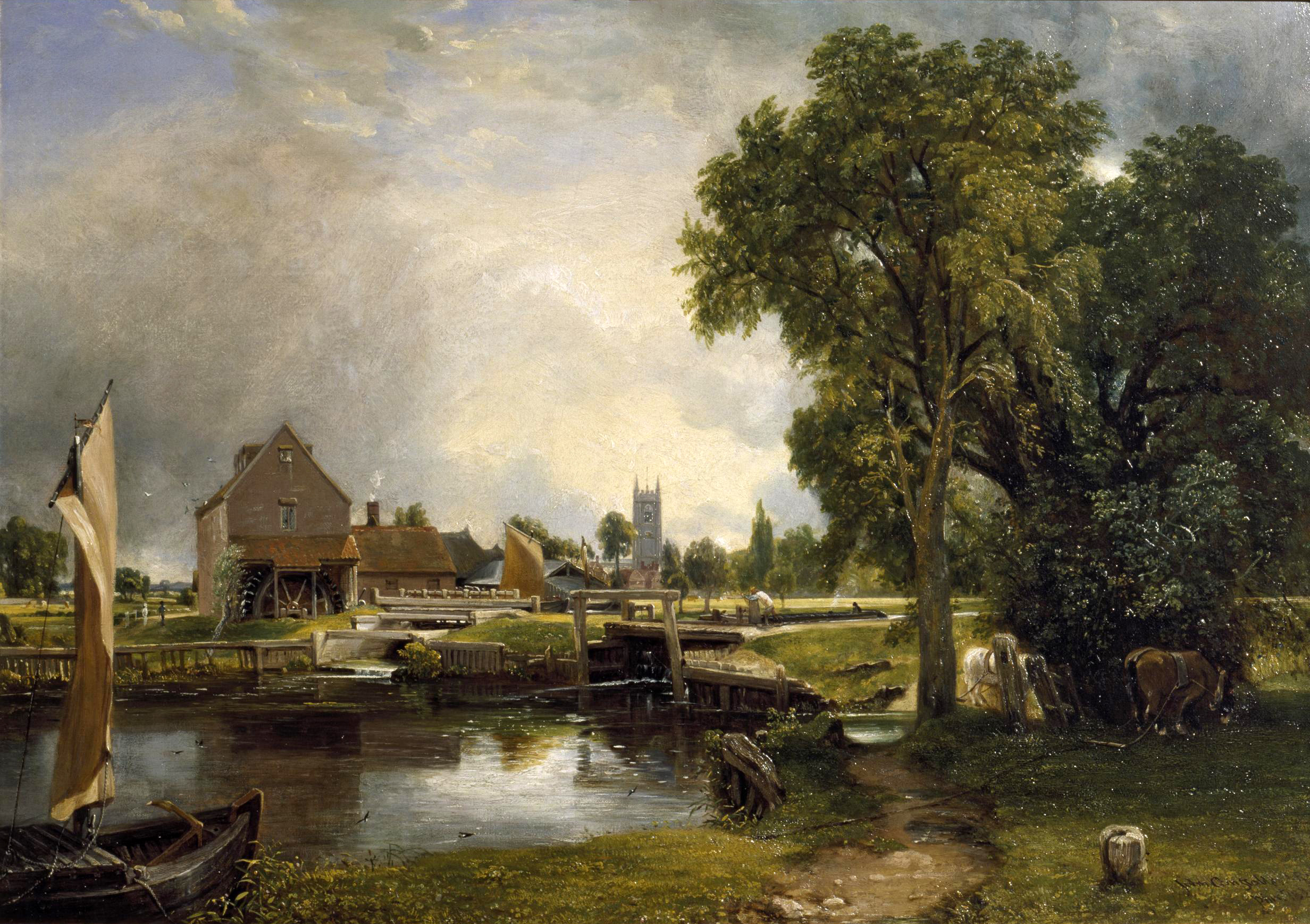
Dedham Lock and Mill (1820), by John Constable, Victoria and Albert Museum

Landscape painting reached new heights with Constable and J. M. W. Turner. Constable focused on natural light and atmospheric effects, developing a “chiaroscuro of nature” through contrasts and sparkling highlights. Turner explored more dramatic phenomena—storms, fire, fog—using light and color to dissolve forms and create dynamic, almost abstract compositions. His later works, built on shifting luminosity, anticipate modern painting.

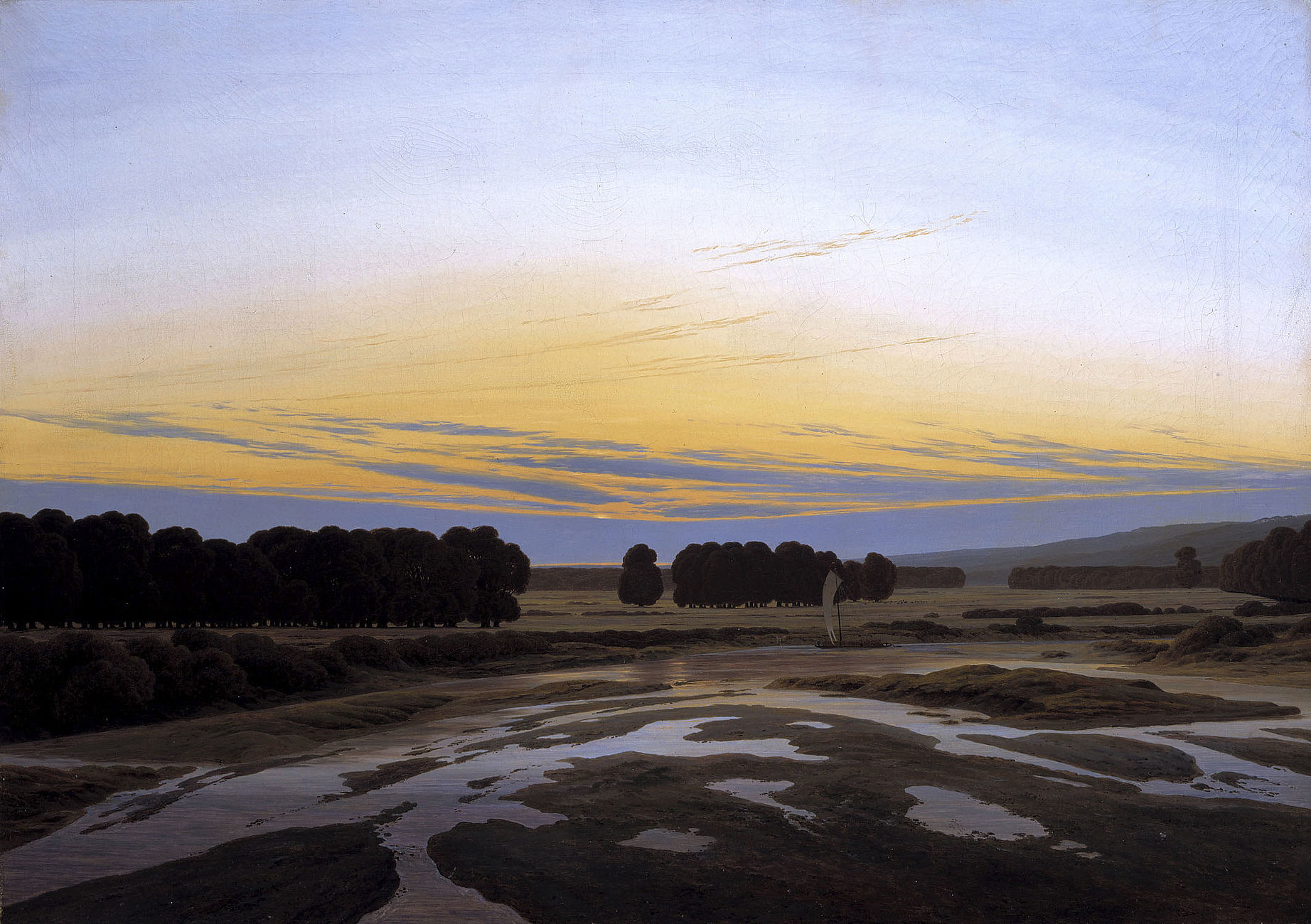
The great reservation (1832), de Caspar David Friedrich, Gemäldegalerie Neue Meister, Dresde

In Germany, Caspar David Friedrich developed a symbolic and contemplative landscape, where light conveys spiritual meaning. Works such as The Cross on the Mountain or Wanderer above the Sea of Fog present nature as vast and transcendent, with dawns and sunsets symbolizing life cycles. His compositions often juxtapose human figures with immense landscapes, emphasizing the sublime.

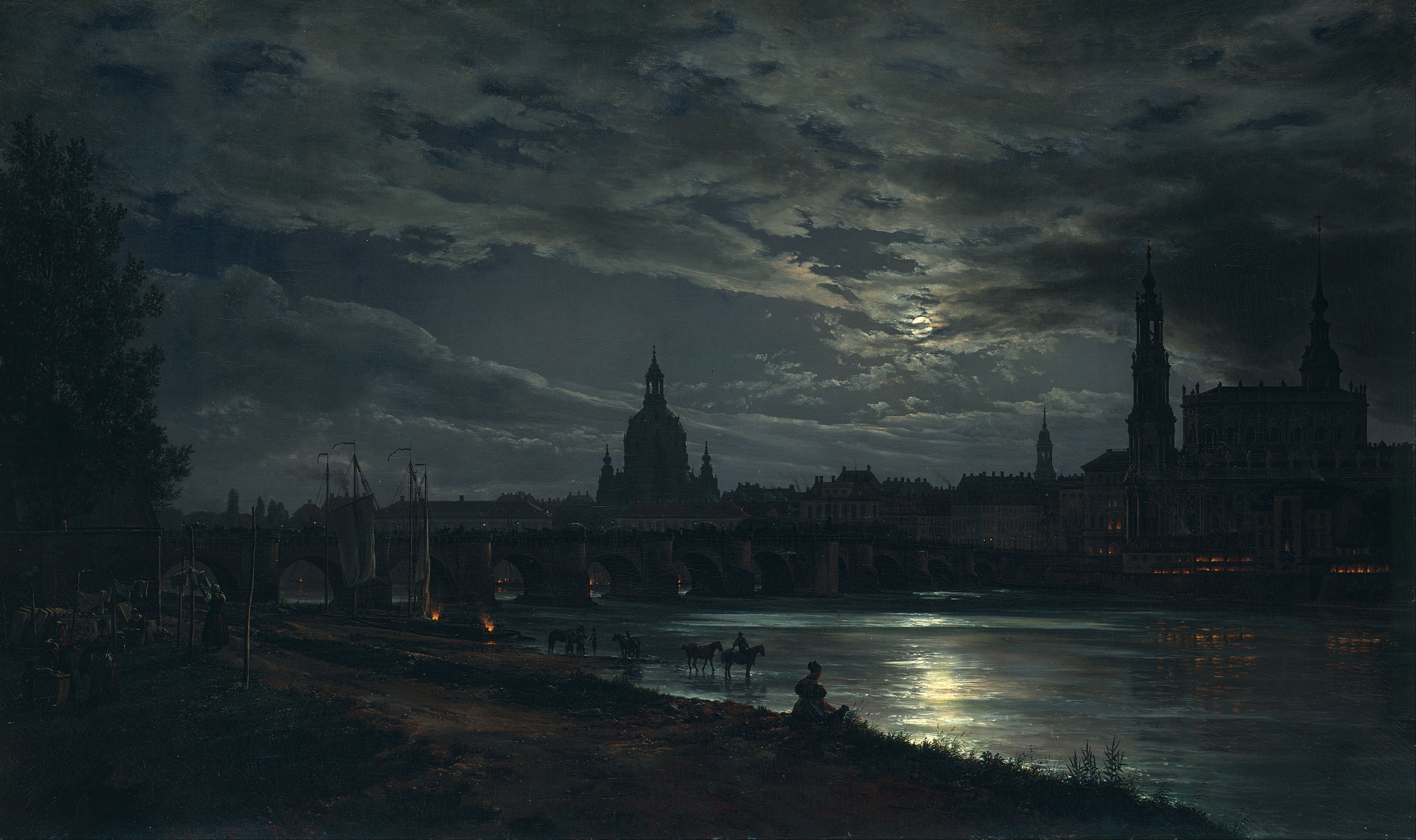
View of Dresden by Moonlight (1839), by Johan Christian Dahl, Gemäldegalerie Neue Meister, Dresden

Other German artists expanded these concerns. Johan Christian Dahl focused on naturalistic atmospheric effects, especially skies and clouds. Georg Friedrich Kersting adapted Romantic light to interiors, using soft artificial illumination. Philipp Otto Runge developed a symbolic theory of color and light, while the Nazarene painters—such as Johann Friedrich Overbeck—favored clear, spiritual luminosity inspired by Renaissance art.

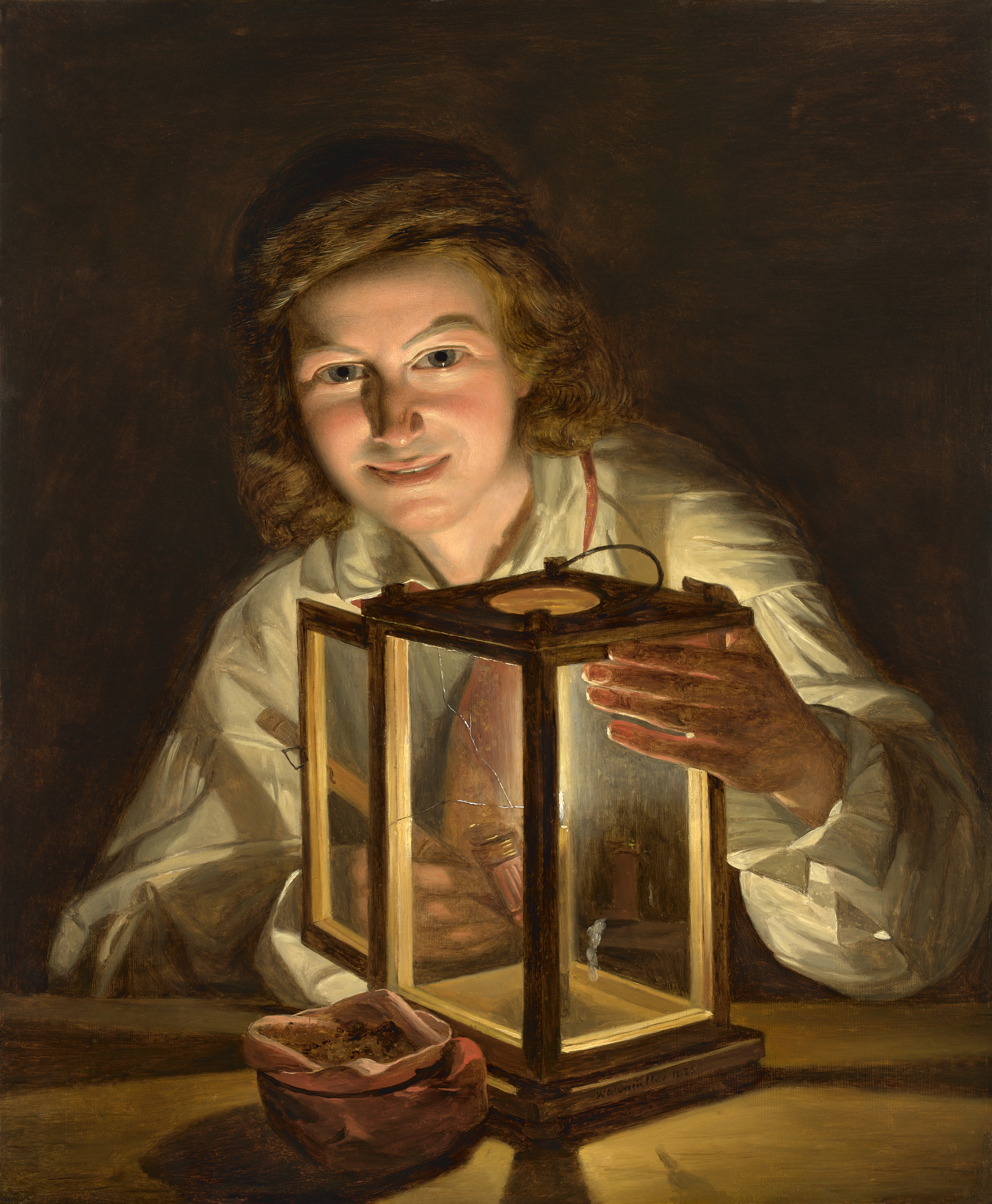
Boy with a stable lantern (1825), by Ferdinand Georg Waldmüller, Hamburger Kunsthalle, HamburgoThr

The Biedermeier movement, represented byFerdinand Georg Waldmüller and others, adopted a more naturalistic approach, with precise, luminous clarity derived from direct observation. Light in these works is tangible and descriptive, constructing the visible world with clarity and detail.

In Italy, the Posillipo School, including Giacinto Gigante and Filippo Palizzi, pursued a more direct and natural rendering of landscape light, emphasizing atmospheric effects and painting from life.

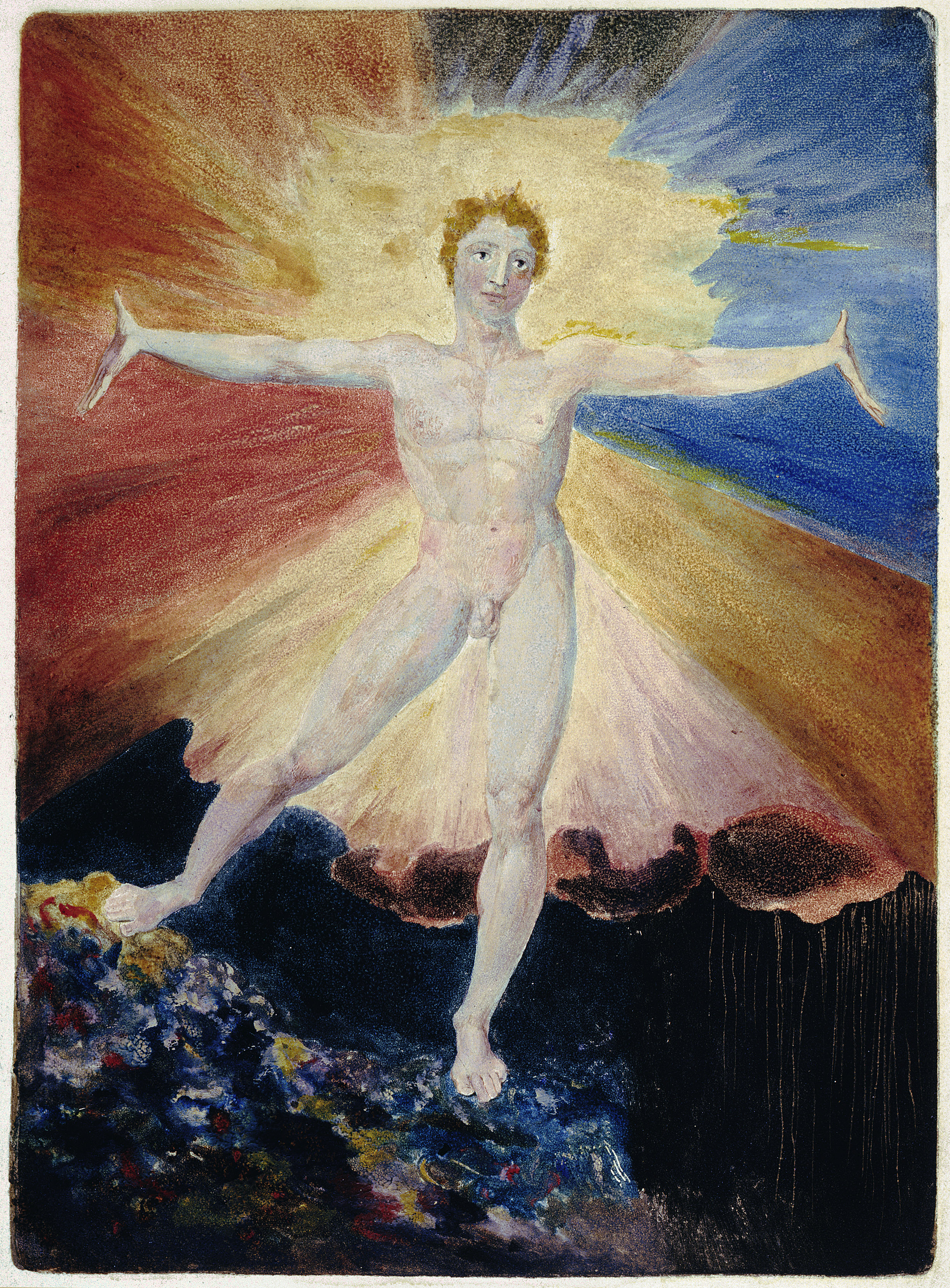
The Dance of Albion (Day of Mirth) (1794-1796), by William Blake, Fitzwilliam Museum, Cambridge

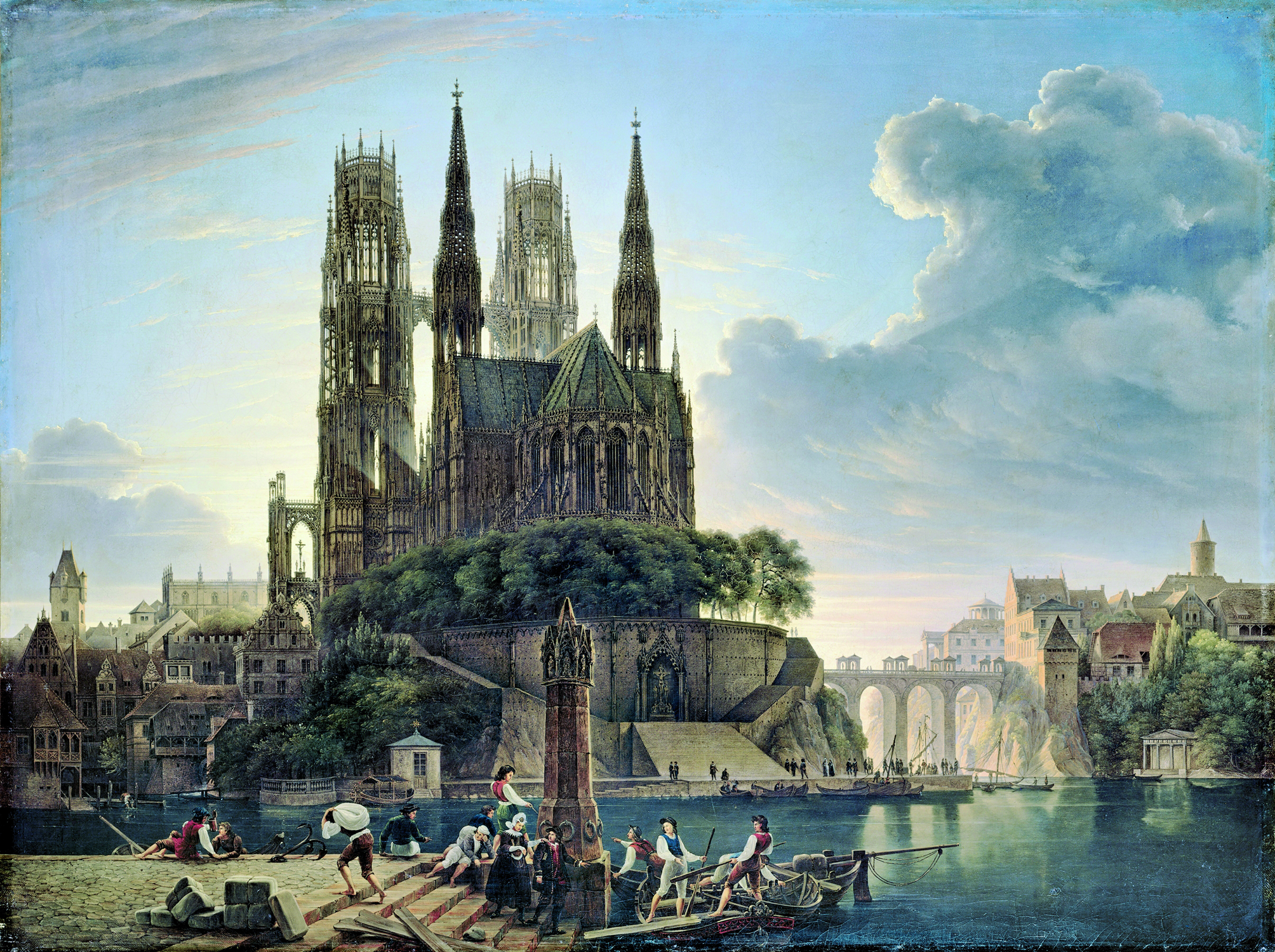
Cathedral over a City (1813), by Karl Friedrich Schinkel, Former National Gallery of Berlin

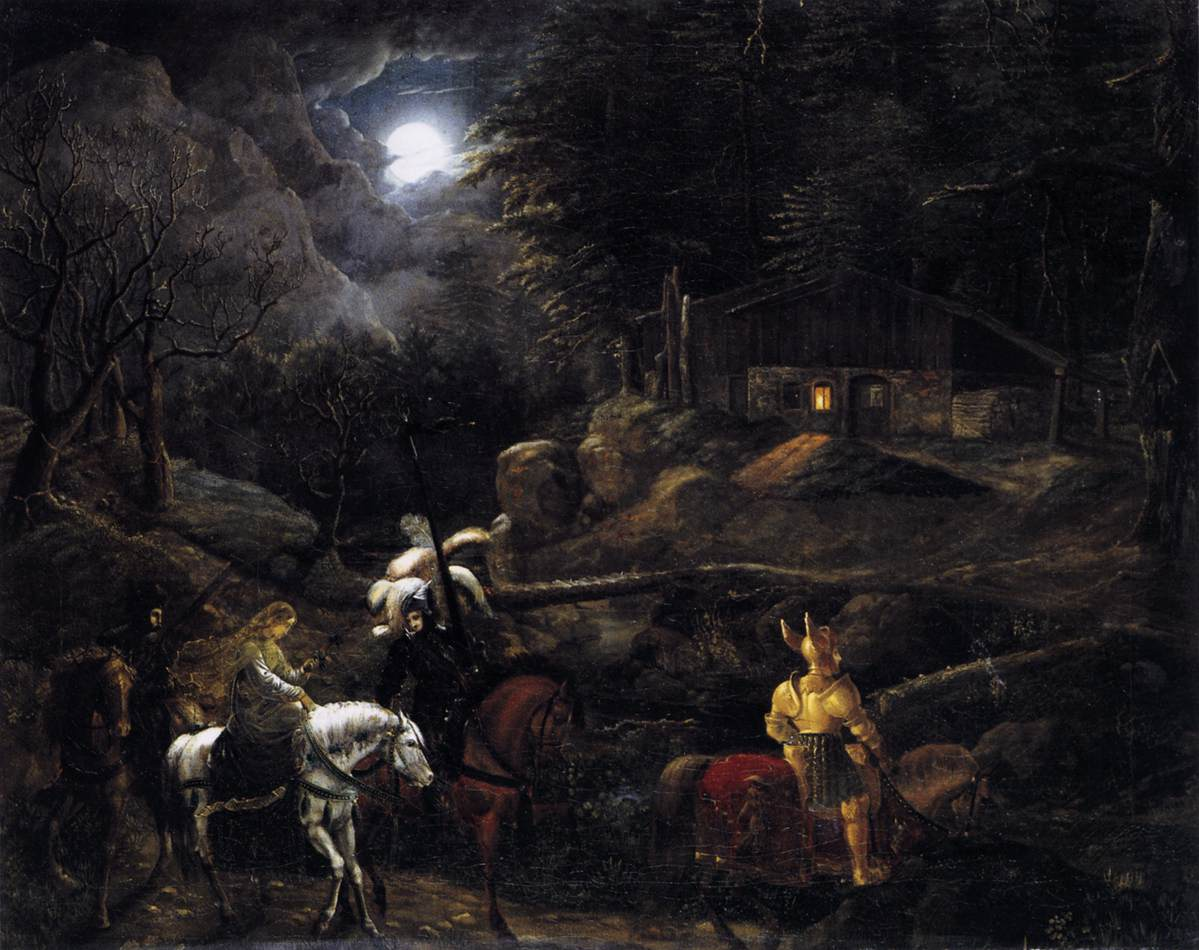
Knights in front of a hut (1816), by Karl Philipp Fohr, Alte Nationalgalerie, Berlin

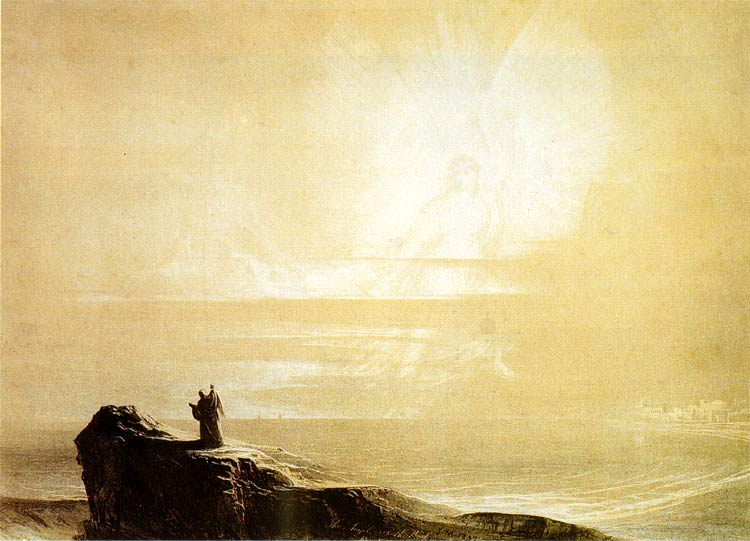
The Angel with a Book (1837), by John Martin, private collection

===== Realism =====
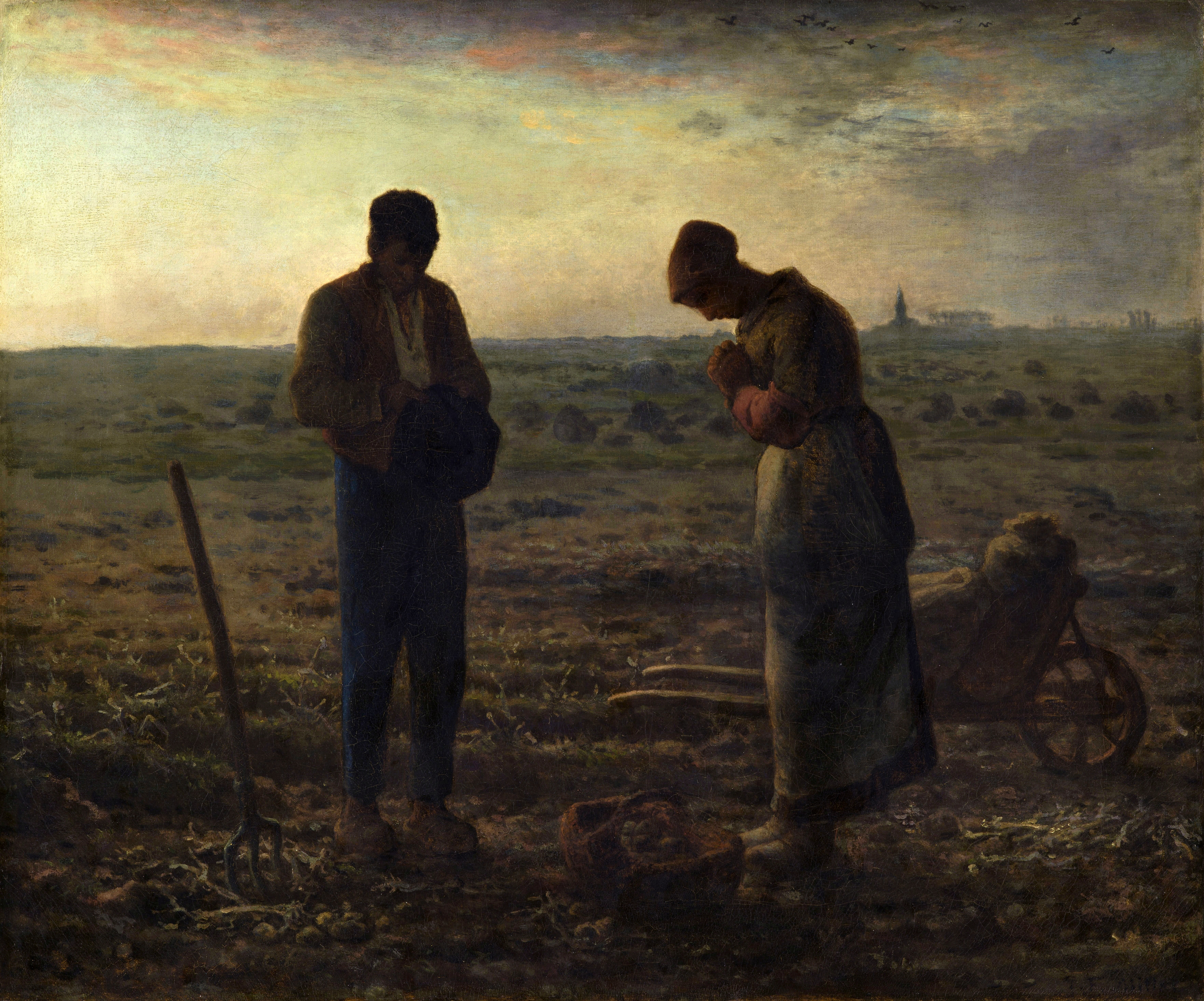
The Angelus (1857), by Jean-François Millet, Musée d'Orsay, Paris

Realism succeeded Romanticism by focusing on the direct depiction of contemporary life, especially that of workers and peasants in the context of the industrial era. Rejecting historical, religious, and mythological themes, realist artists emphasized observation and often conveyed a social message.

One of its figures, Jean-François Millet, specialized in rural scenes set at dawn or dusk, where light reinforces the emotional and social tone. In The Angelus, subdued contrasts and a luminous sky enhance the monumentality of the figures and the contemplative atmosphere. His technique, based on dense brushwork and strong chiaroscuro, heightens both volume and expressiveness.

The leading exponent of the movement was Gustave Courbet, who rejected idealization in favor of direct observation. Influenced by earlier masters such as Rembrandt, he employed a material, tactile technique with thick pigment and broad surfaces. His light evolves from early dramatic effects toward a more naturalistic luminosity. Another important figure, Honoré Daumier, used strong contrasts of light and shadow in paintings and lithographs with a critical, often satirical tone, inspired in part by Francisco de Goya.

Closely related to realism was the Barbizon School, with artists such as Camille Corot, Théodore Rousseau, Charles-François Daubigny, and Narcisse-Virgile Díaz de la Peña. They focused on landscape painting and the direct observation of nature, often working outdoors. Corot, in particular, developed a delicate, atmospheric light, often filtered through foliage or reflected on water, creating soft tonal harmonies.

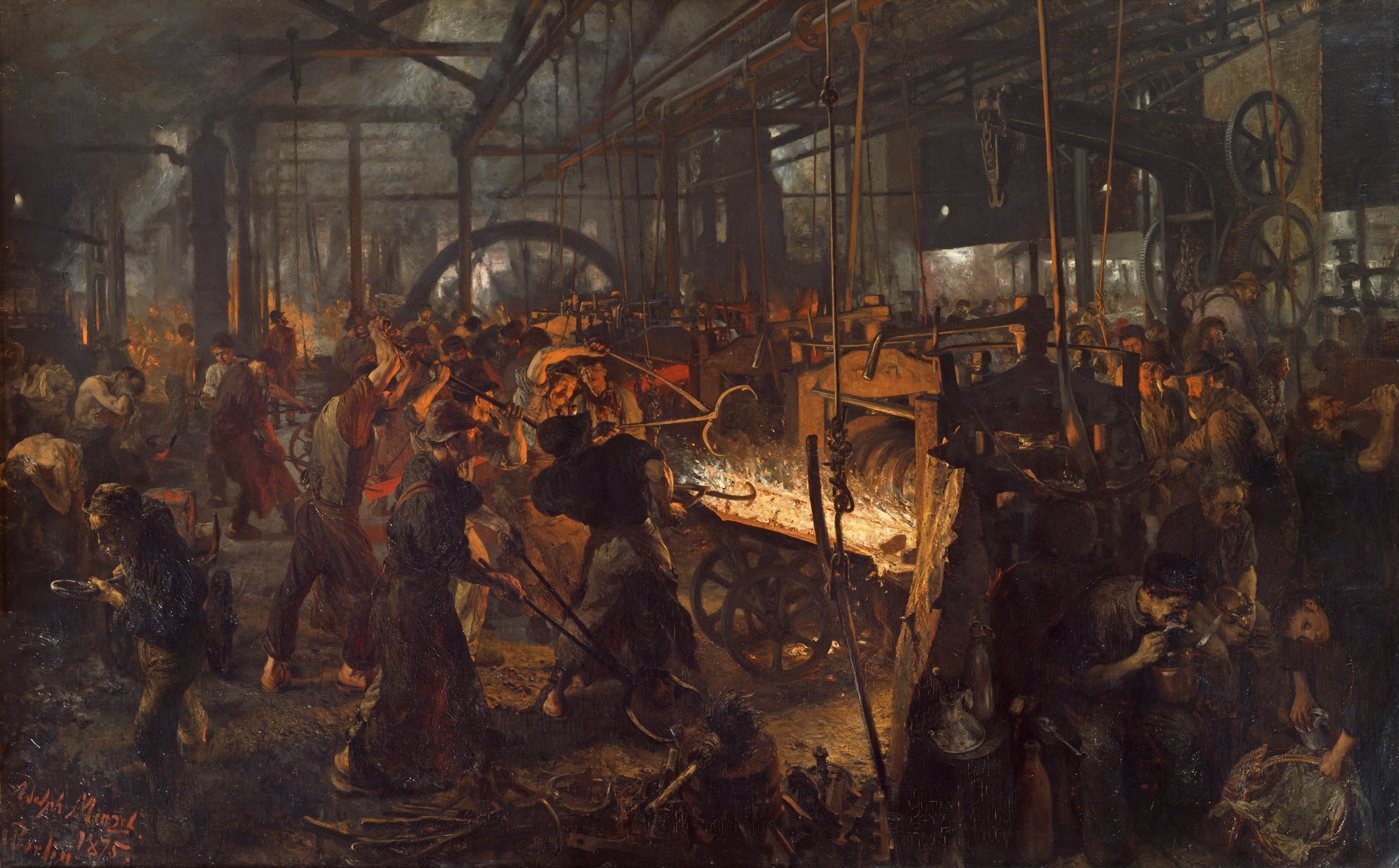
The Steelworkers (1875), by Adolph von Menzel, Alte Nationalgalerie, Berlin

This naturalistic approach was further developed by Eugène Boudin, a pioneer of plein air painting and a precursor of Impressionism. His luminous skies and reflections on water were rendered with a rapid, spontaneous technique that captured fleeting atmospheric effects.

In Germany, Adolph von Menzel emphasized light as a defining element of perception, both in landscapes and in interior scenes illuminated by artificial sources. Hans Thoma combined realism with a lyrical sensibility, often using a soft, silvery light. In the Netherlands, Johan Barthold Jongkind explored atmospheric light, especially in water and winter scenes, influencing later artists such as Monet.

In Spain, landscape painters such as Carlos de Haes, Agustín Riancho and Joaquín Vayreda depicted natural settings with attention to light and atmosphere. Mariano Fortuny introduced a more vibrant, luminous style influenced by North African light, using quick, expressive brushstrokes.

In Italy, the Macchiaioli, such as Giovanni Fattori, reduced painting to contrasts of light and color (“macchie”), emphasizing direct observation and anticipating Impressionism. Their works capture the intensity of Mediterranean light through bold tonal contrasts. In Great Britain, the Pre-Raphaelite Brotherhood, including John Everett Millais and William Holman Hunt, pursued a highly detailed realism with bright, even lighting that minimized chiaroscuro. Their works often combined precise observation with symbolic meanings, as in Hunt’s The Light of the World, where light carries religious significance.

Romanticism and realism were the first artistic movements that rejected the official art of the time, the art taught in the academies – academicism – an art that was institutionalized and anchored in the past both in the choice of subjects and in the techniques and resources made available to the artist. In France, in the second half of the 19th century, this art was called art pompier ("fireman's art", a pejorative name derived from the fact that many authors represented classical heroes with helmets that resembled fireman's helmets). Although in principle the academies were in tune with the art produced at the time, so we can not speak of a distinct style, in the 19th century, when the evolutionary dynamics of the styles began to move away from the classical canons, academic art was constrained in a classicist style based on strict rules. Academicism was stylistically based on Greco-Roman classicism, but also on earlier classicist authors, such as Raphael, Poussin or Guido Reni. Technically, it was based on careful drawing, formal balance, perfect line, plastic purity and careful detailing, together with realistic and harmonious coloring. Many of its representatives had a special predilection for the nude as an artistic theme, as well as a special attraction for orientalism. Its main representatives were: William-Adolphe Bouguereau, Alexandre Cabanel, Eùgene-Emmanuel Amaury-Duval and Jean-Léon Gérôme.

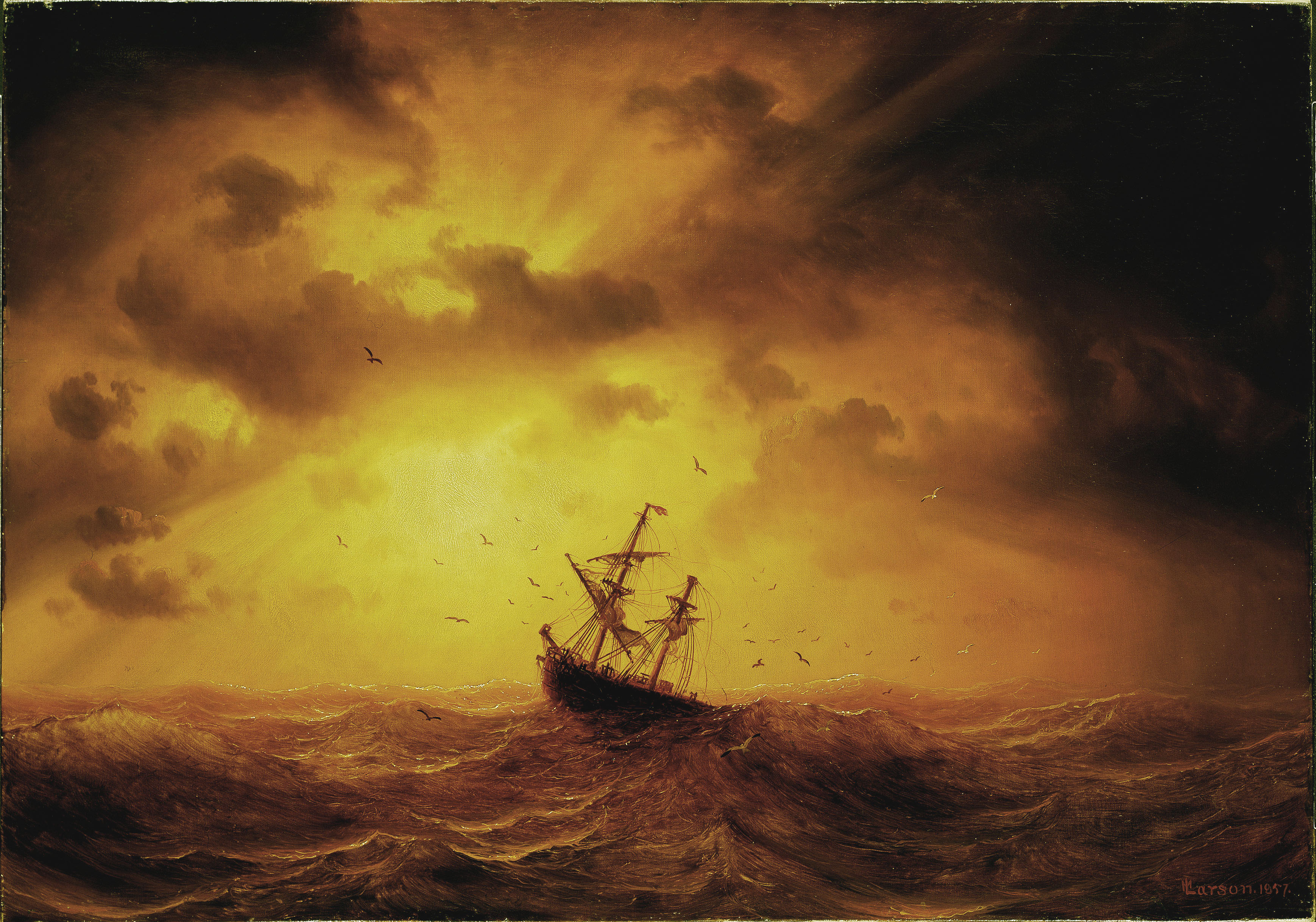
Stormy Sea (1857), by Marcus Larson, National Museum, Stockholm

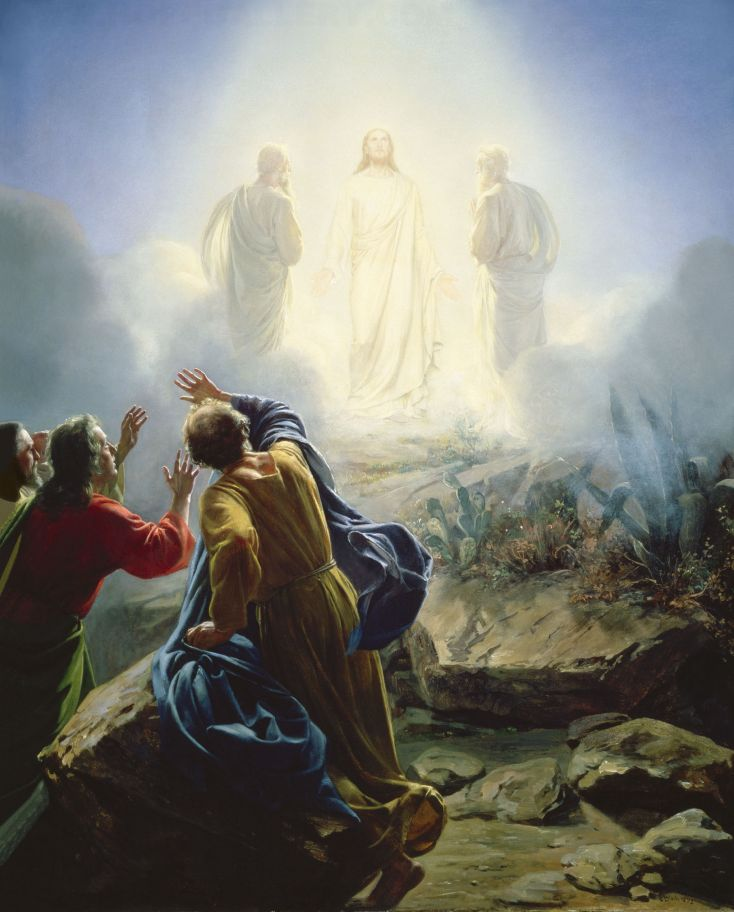
The Transfiguration (1872), by Carl Bloch, Frederiksborg Museum, Frederiksborg

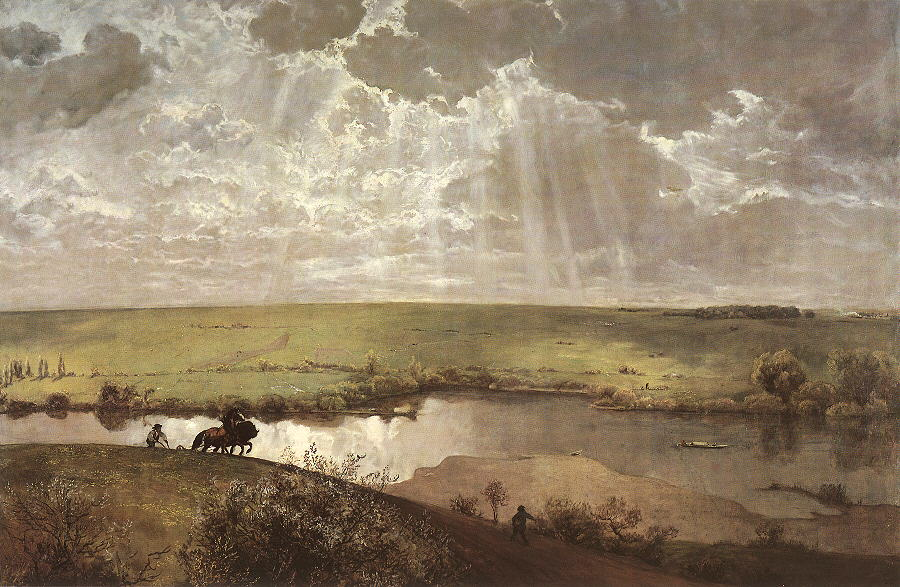
Mainlandschaft (1875), by Hans Thoma, Neue Pinakothek, Munich

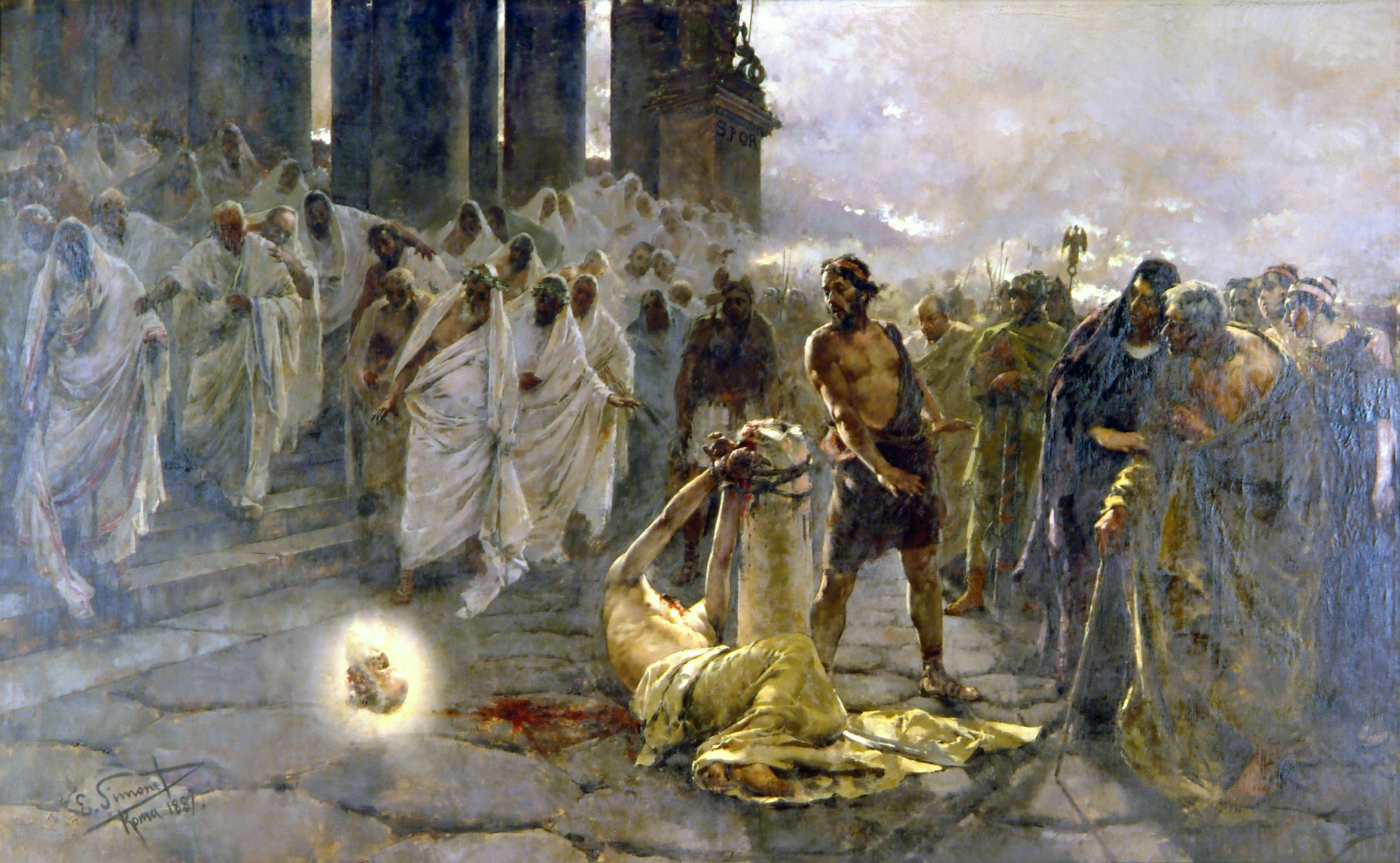
Decapitation of Saint Paul (1887), by Enrique Simonet, Malaga Cathedral.

===== Impressionism =====
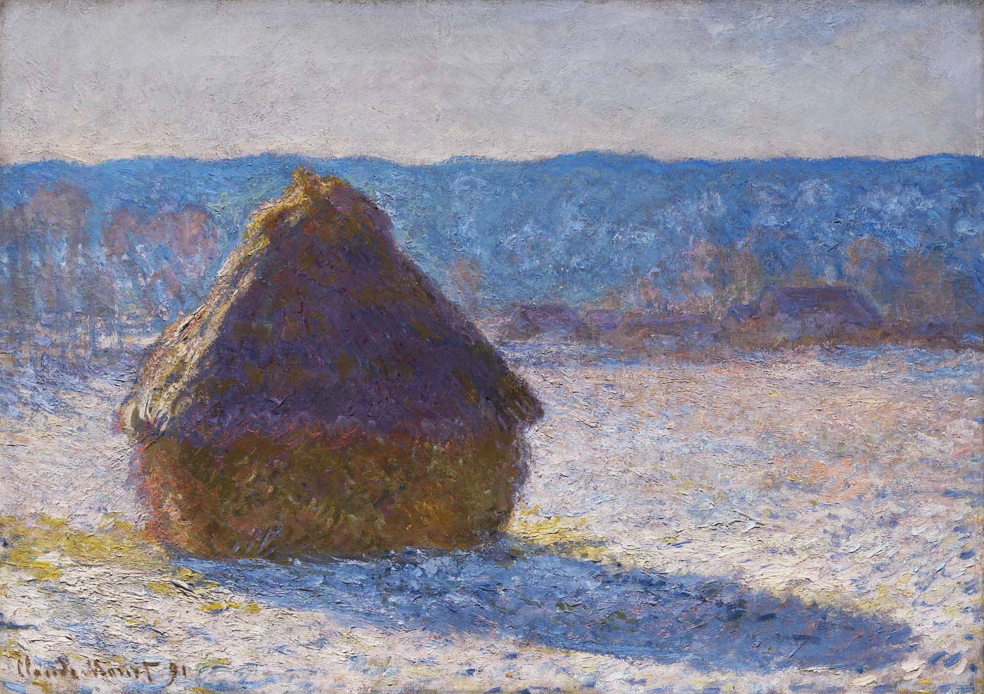
Wicker in the Morning (1891), by Claude Monet, Museum of Fine Arts, Boston

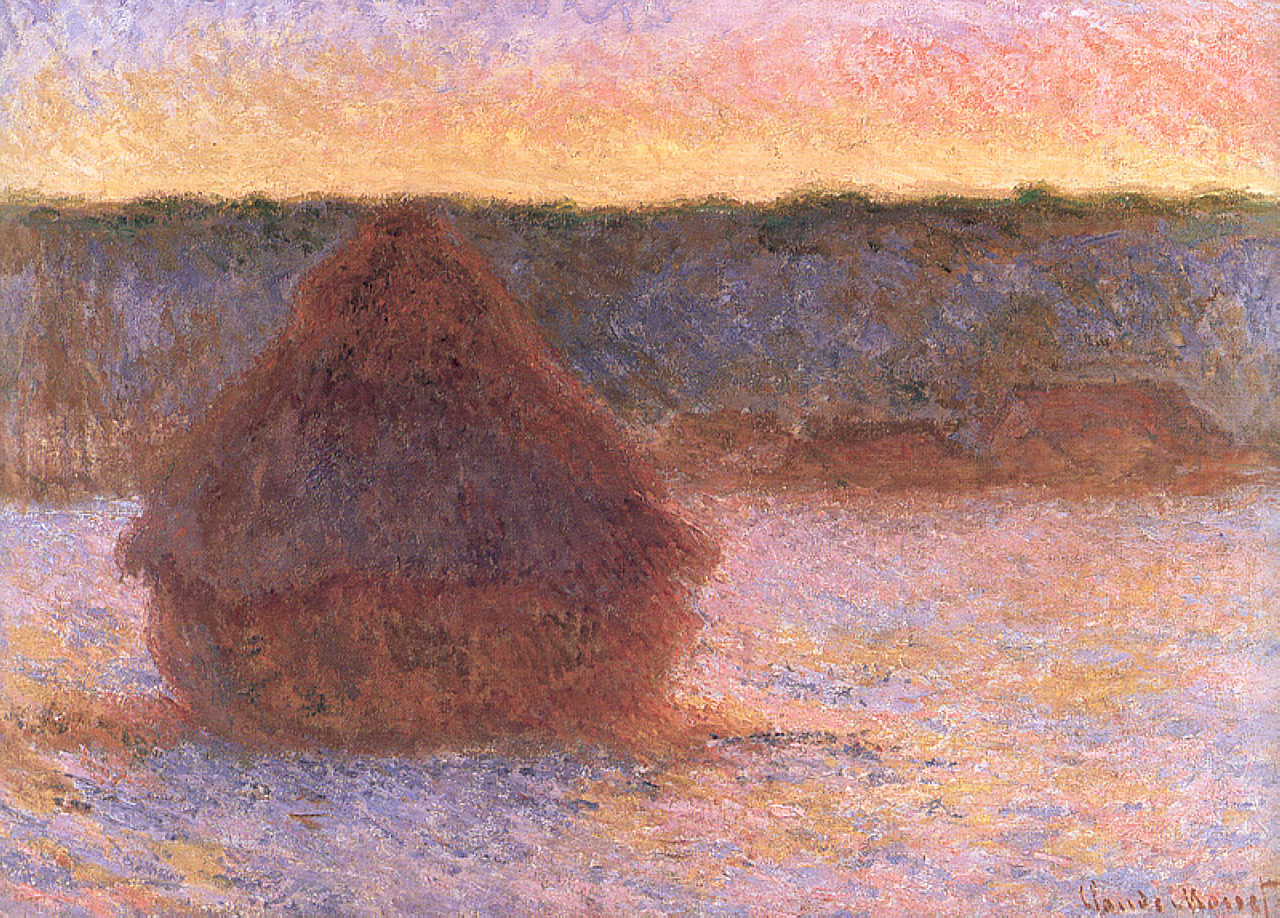
Haystack at Sunset (1891), by Claude Monet, private collection

Light played a fundamental role in Impressionism, a style based on representing the visual “impression” produced by light. In contrast to academic art, grounded in linear perspective and geometry, Impressionists sought to capture reality as perceived by the eye, giving primacy to light and color. They often painted outdoors (en plen air), studying the changing effects of light at different times of day. Their technique relied on loose brushstrokes and the application of pure, unmixed colors—especially contrasts between primary and complementary tones—to achieve greater luminosity.

Impressionism refined the depiction of light through fragmented touches of color, building on earlier practices by artists such as Diego Velázquez. Light became the central subject of painting, leading artists to work from life and to produce series capturing variations of the same motif under different lighting conditions. Drawing and traditional chiaroscuro were largely abandoned; instead, form and volume were defined through color. Dark tones such as black were minimized in favor of a luminous palette of “light on light.” Influenced by developments in photography, Impressionists emphasized that visual perception depends on the quality and intensity of light. Artificial light also became a significant theme, especially in modern urban settings such as cafés, theaters, and streets, where lamps and reflections created new visual effects.

A Bar at the Folies-Bergère by Édouard Manet, completed in 1882

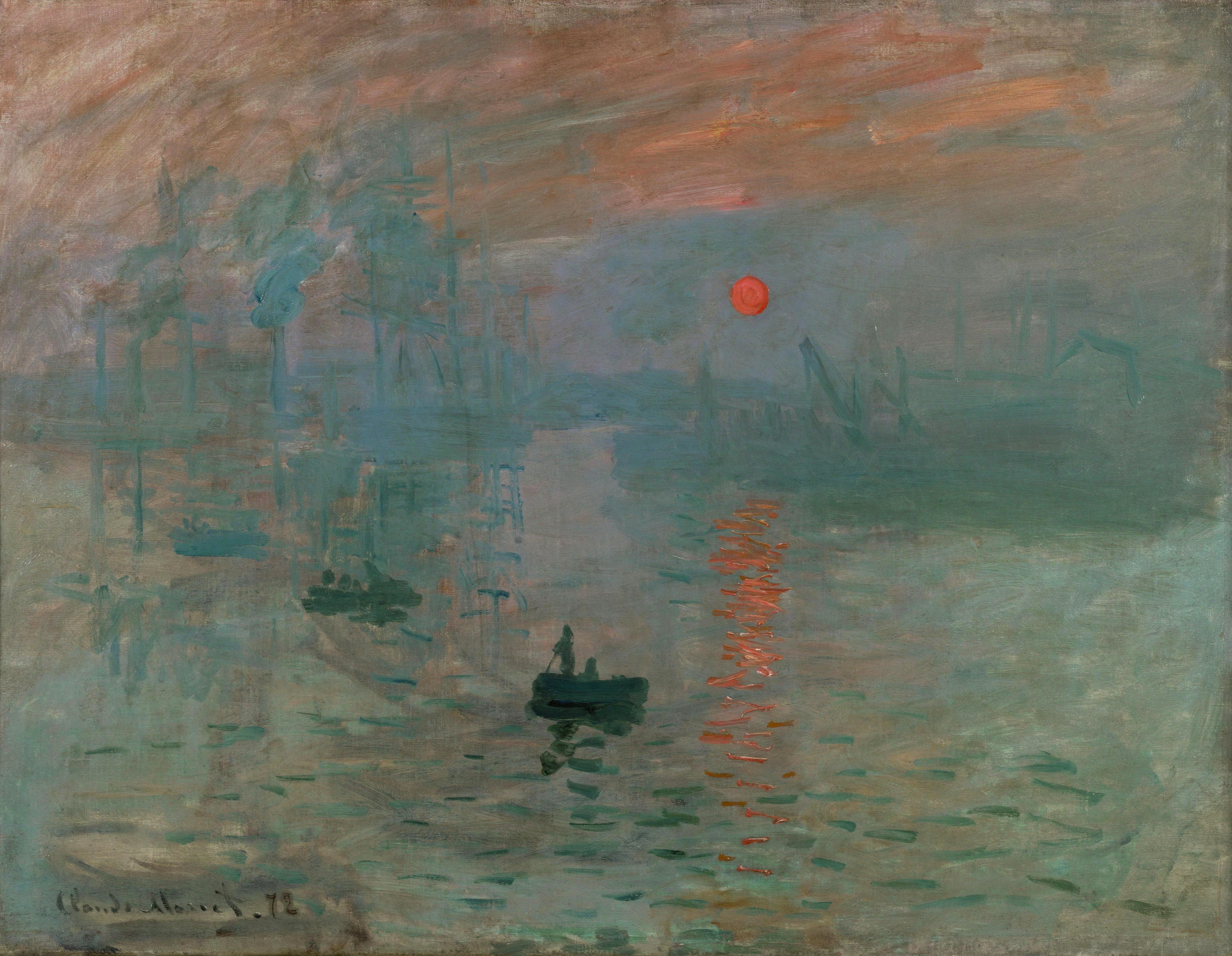
Impression, Sunrise (1873), by Claude Monet, Musée Marmottan-Monet, Paris

The principal figures of the movement include Claude Monet, Camille Pissarro, Alfred Sisley, Pierre-Auguste Renoir and Edgar Degas, with Édouard Manet as a precursor. Monet, Sisley and Pissarro focused especially on landscape and atmospheric light, producing series that explored temporal variations. Renoir emphasized the human figure and the interplay of light and movement, while Degas concentrated on artificial lighting and dynamic compositions influenced by photography.

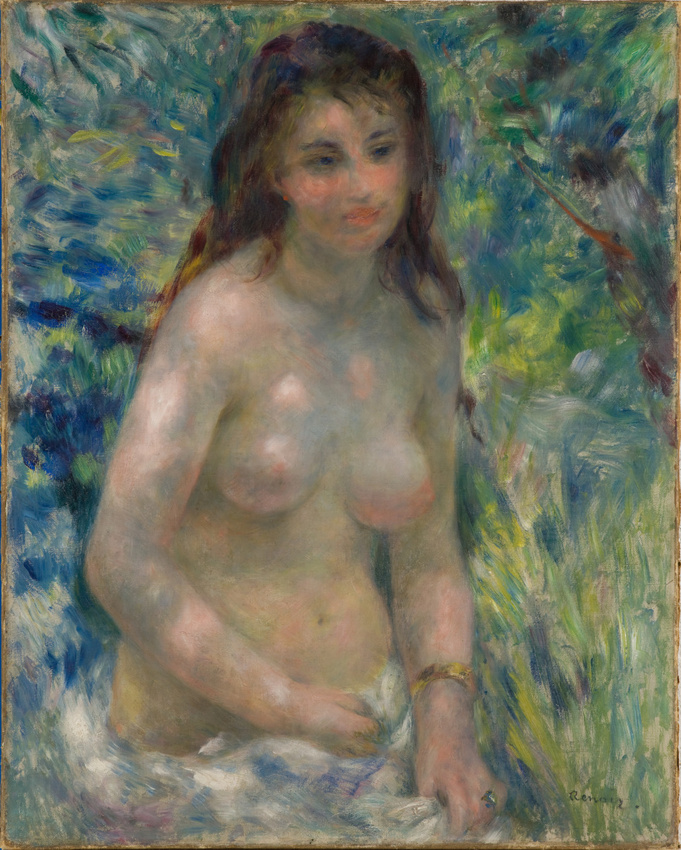
Torso, Effect of Sunlight (1875), by Pierre-Auguste Renoir, Musée d'Orsay, Paris

From the 1880s, a reaction within Impressionism led to new developments. Neo-Impressionism, or Pointillism, systematized optical research through the use of small dots of pure color that blend in the viewer’s eye, based on scientific theories of color. Its main representatives were Georges Seurat and Paul Signac. Post-impressionism encompassed diverse artists who moved beyond Impressionist principles, including Paul Cézanne, Vincent van Gogh, Paul Gauguin and Henri de Toulouse-Lautrec. These artists explored new approaches to light, whether through structural color, symbolic intensity or emotional expression.

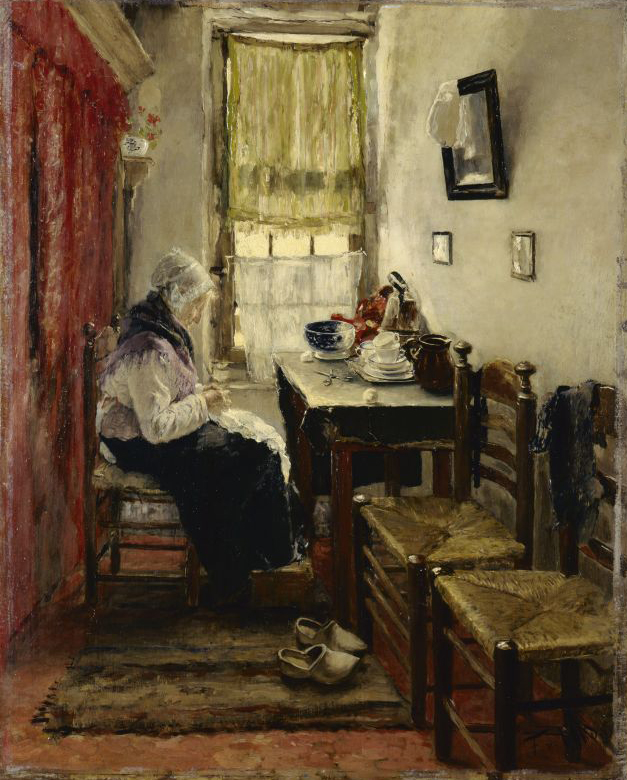
In the Old People's Home in Zandvoort (1882), Fritz von Uhde, Germanisches Nationalmuseum, Núremberg

Impressionism also spread internationally, influencing artists in Germany, Great Britain, the United States, Scandinavia, Russia and Spain, where it was adapted to local traditions and light conditions while maintaining its central concern with the perception and representation of light.

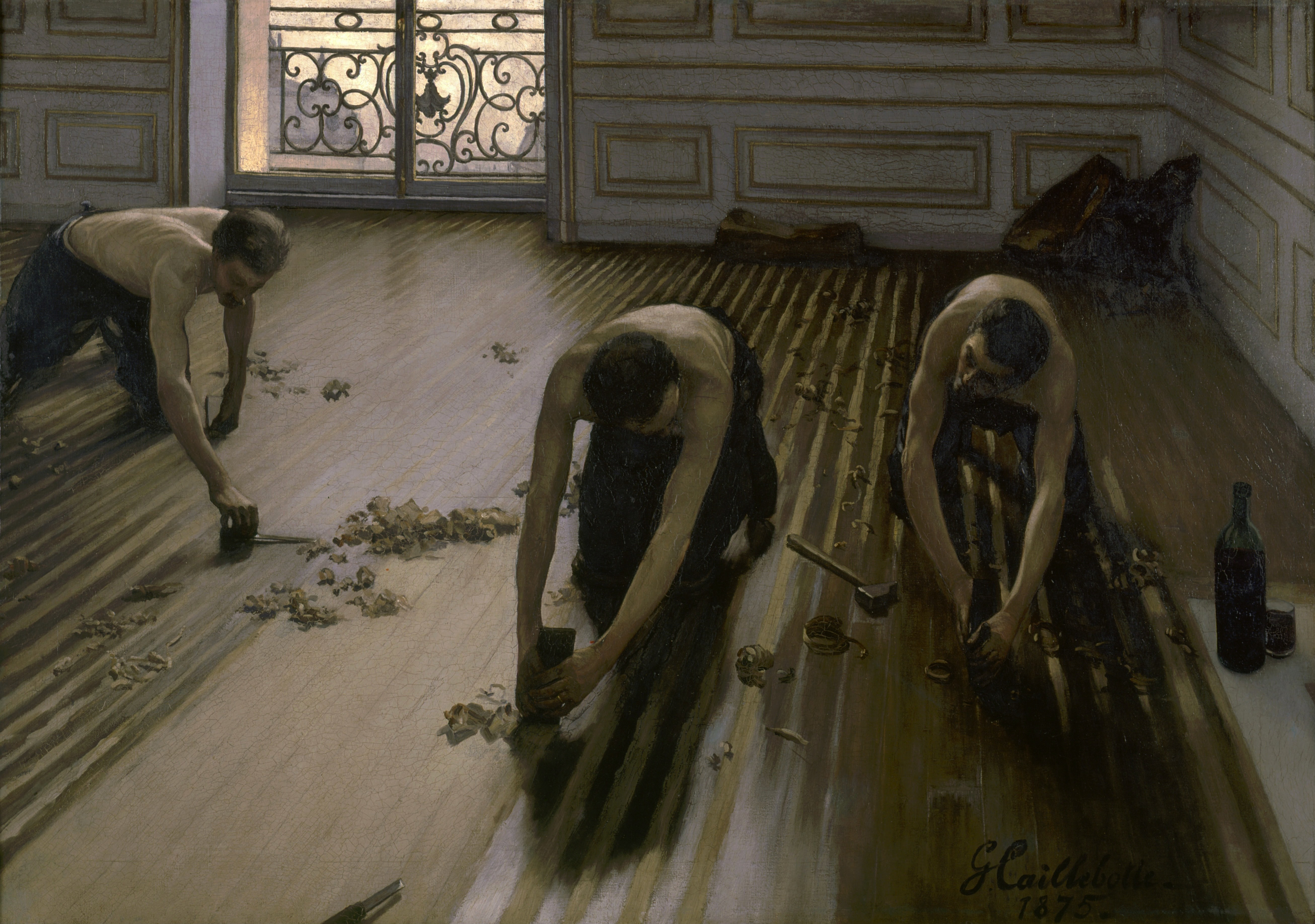
The Parquet Floor Planers (1875), by Gustave Caillebotte, Musée d'Orsay, Paris

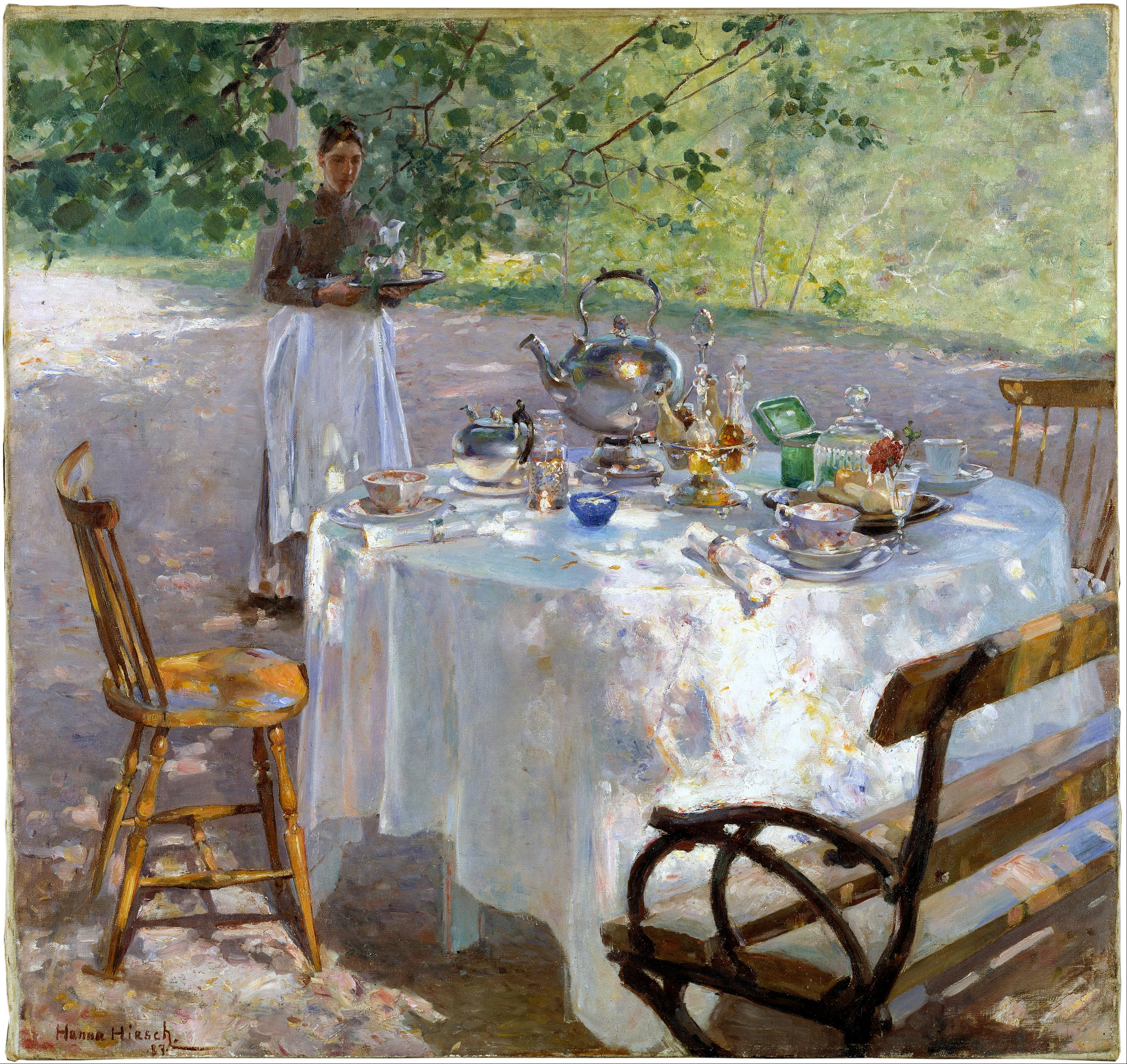
Breakfast (1887), by Hanna Pauli, Nationalmuseum, Stockholm

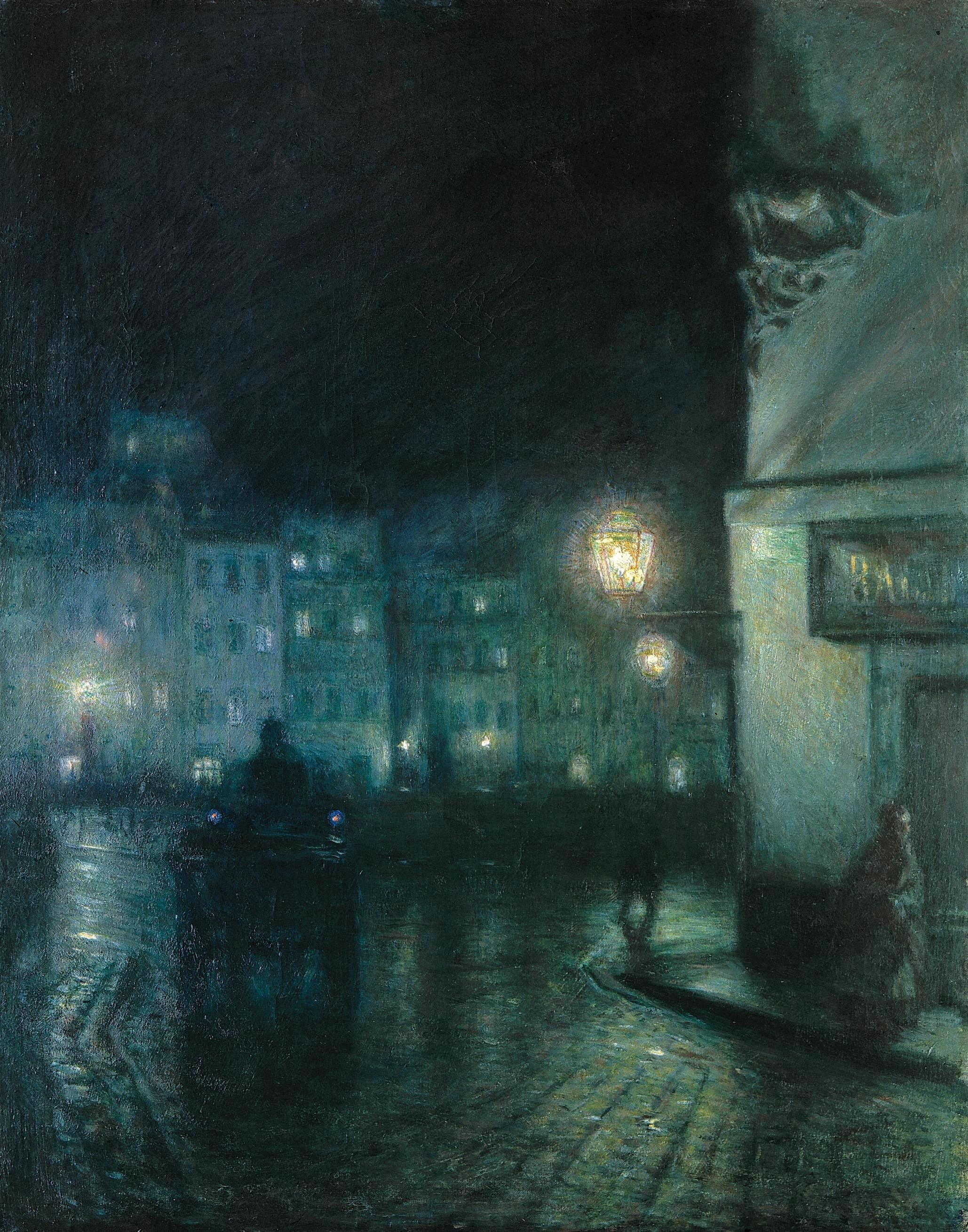
The Old Town Market at Night (1892), by Józef Pankiewicz, Muzéum Narodówe, Poznań

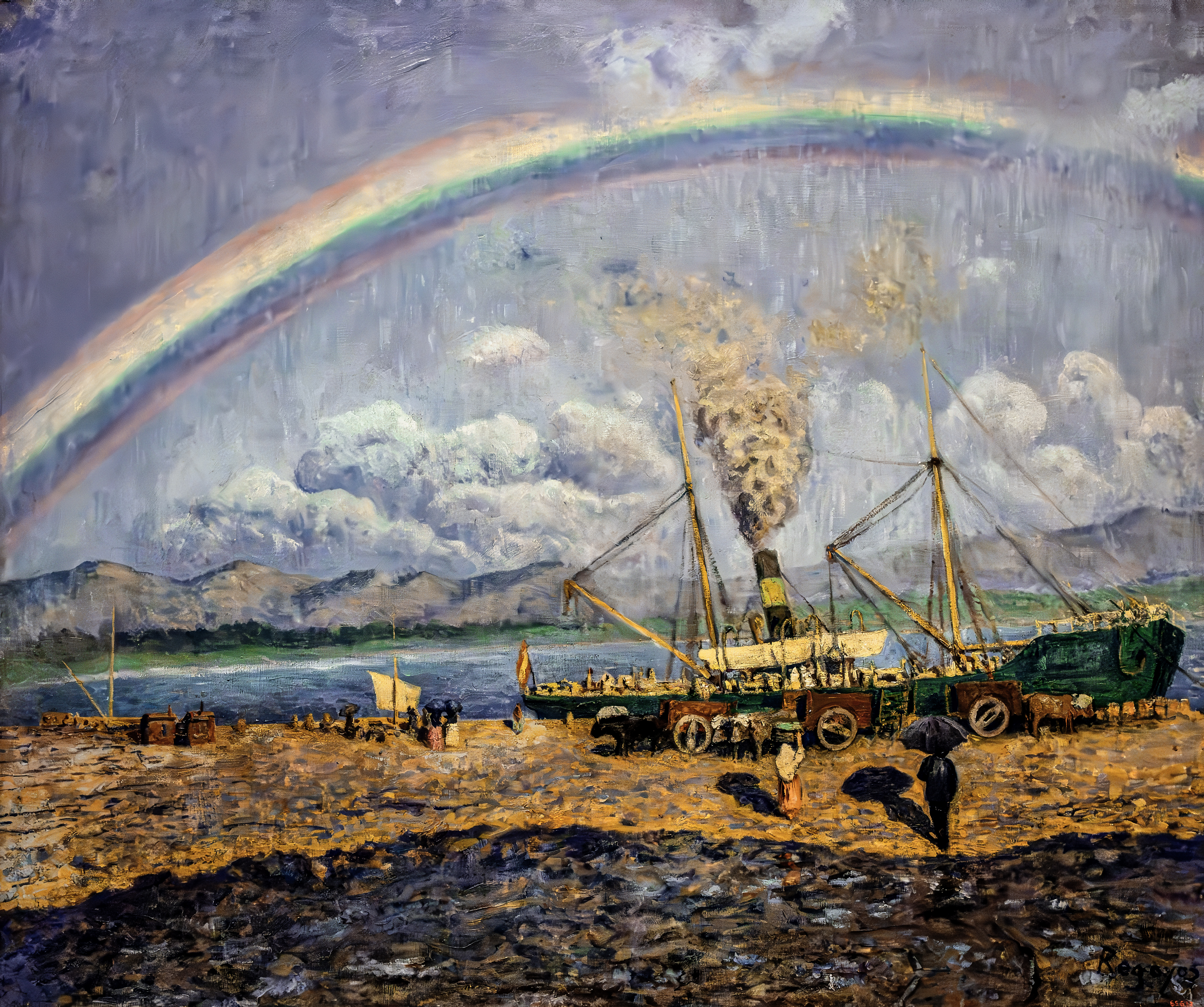
Rainbow over the Harbor (1900), by Darío de Regoyos, Museo Nacional de Arte de Cataluña, Barcelona

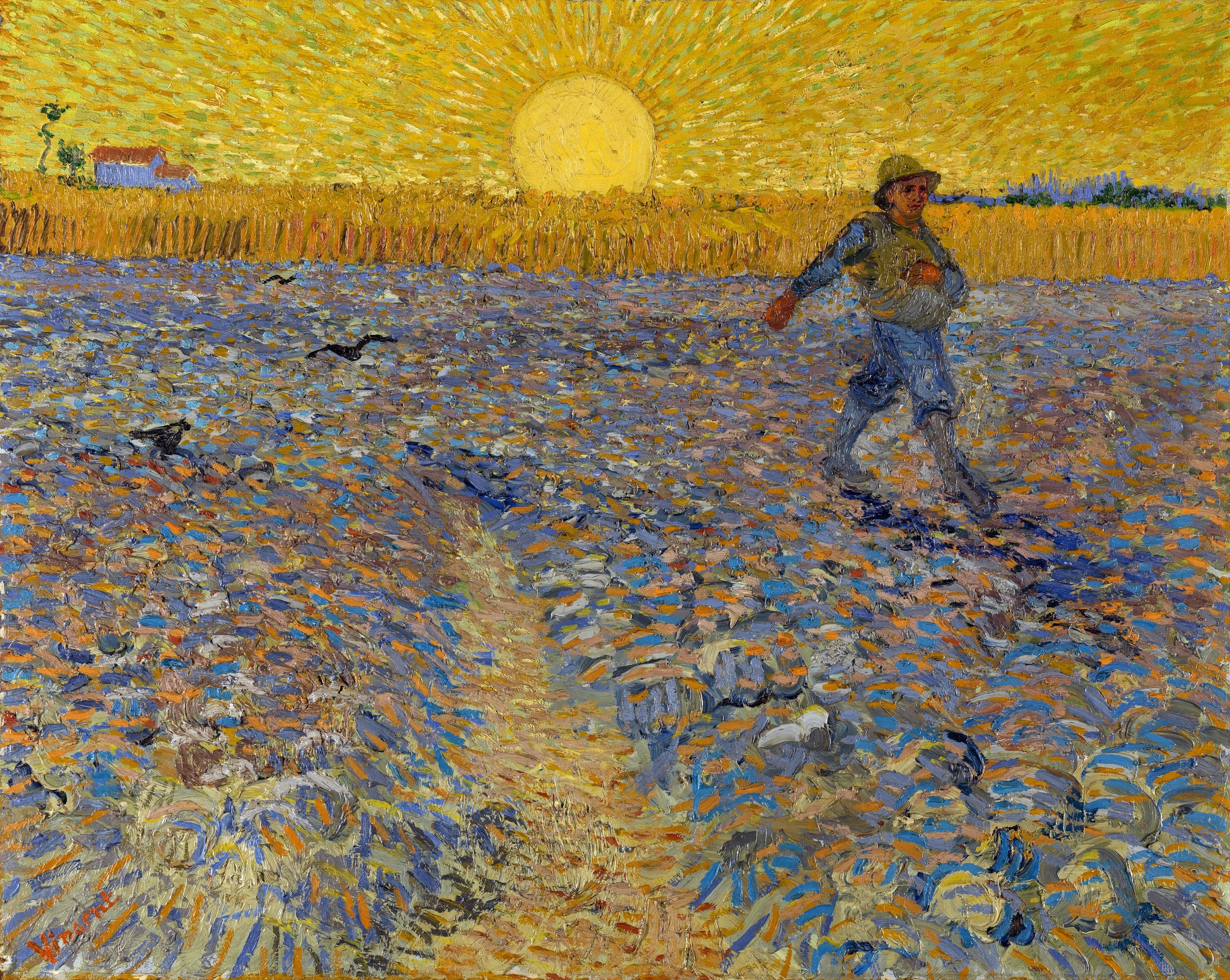
The Sower (1888), by Vincent van Gogh, Museo Kröller-Müller, Otterlo

A Sunday Afternoon on the Island of La Grande Jatte (1884–1886), by Georges Seurat, Art Institute of Chicago

===== Luminism and symbolism =====
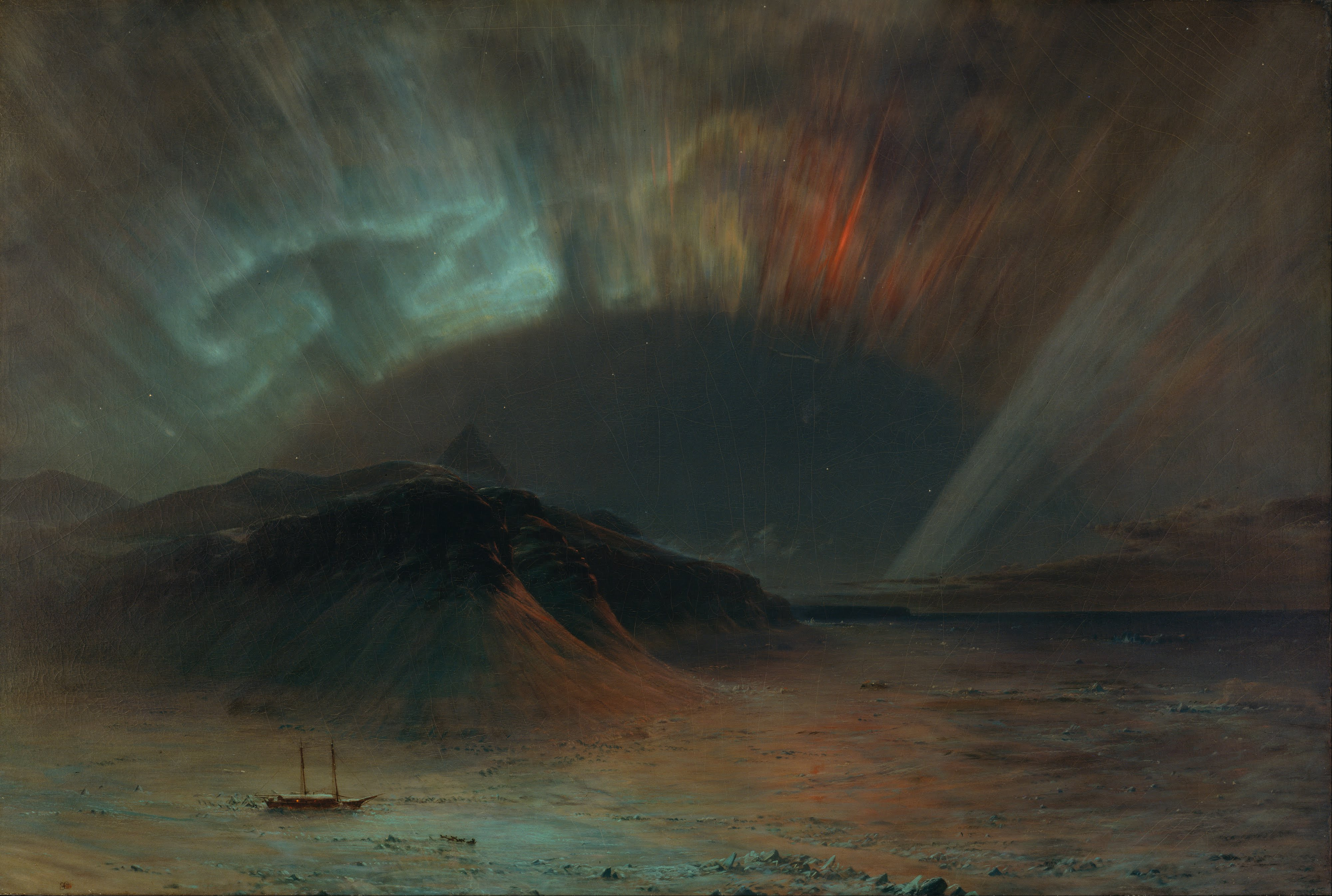
Aurora borealis (1865), by Frederic Edwin Church, Smithsonian American Art Museum, Washington D. C.

From the mid-19th century to the turn of the 20th century, various artistic trends emphasized the representation of light, often grouped under the term luminism. This concept, later defined by John Ireland Howe Baur, refers particularly to American landscape painting (1840–1880) characterized by meticulous realism, imperceptible brushwork, and subtle tonal gradations to render atmospheric effects.

In the United States, luminism is associated with the Hudson River School, whose artists, including Thomas Cole, Asher Brown Durand, Frederic Edwin Church, Albert Bierstadt, Martin Johnson Heade, Fitz Henry Lane, John Frederick Kensett, James Augustus Suydam, Francis Augustus Silva, Jasper Francis Cropsey and George Caleb Bingham, depicted expansive landscapes with serene, spiritual light. Some historians distinguish between this broader school, with its dramatic and monumental vision of nature, and a more restrained luminism focused on calm scenes, refined light, and precise detail. The light in these works often conveys a contemplative or transcendental relationship with nature. Among American painters, Winslow Homer stands out for his seascapes and sensitive treatment of changing light, particularly in marine and nocturnal scenes.

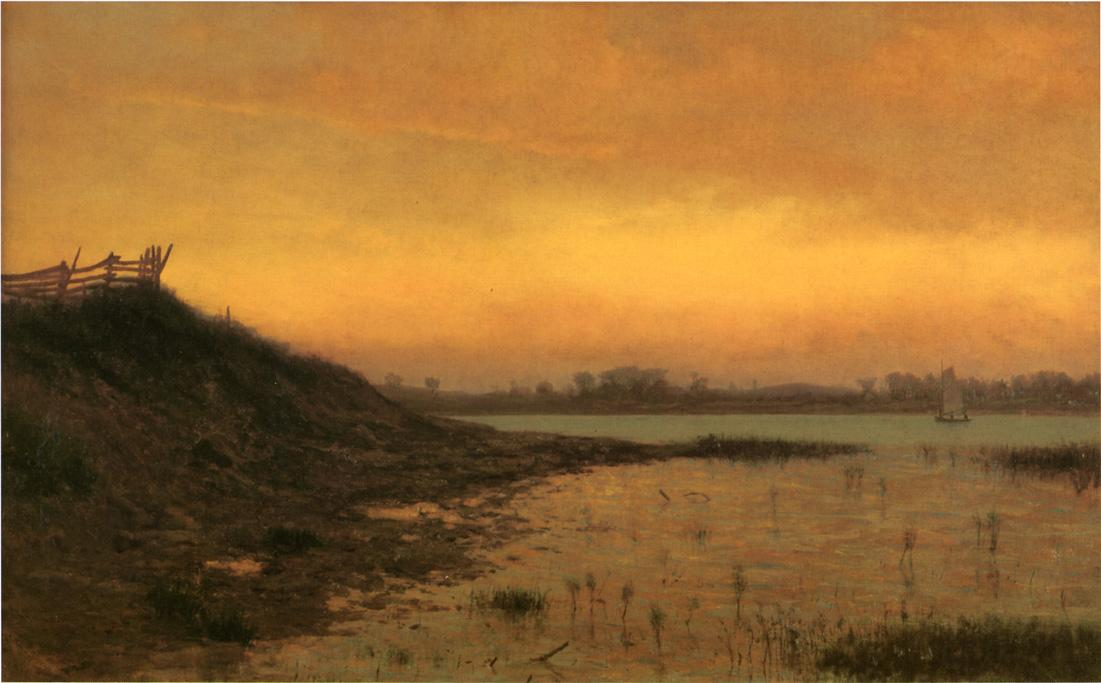
Long Island (1862), by James Augustus Suydam, private collection

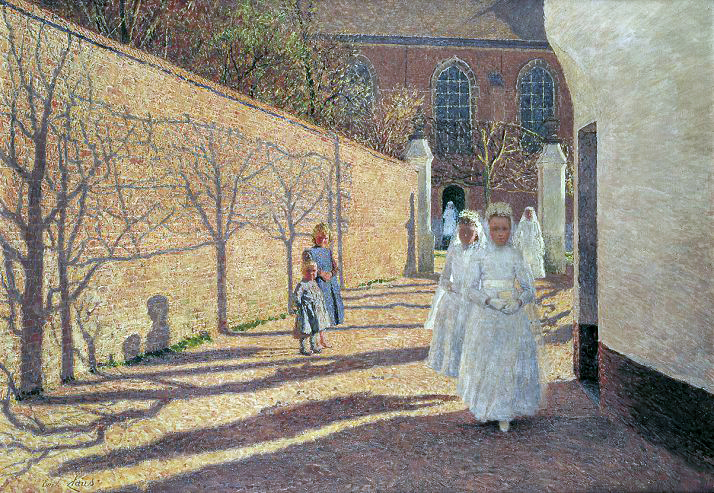
First communion (1893), by Émile Claus

In Europe, luminist tendencies developed in several countries. In Belgium, artists such as Émile Claus and Théo van Rysselberghe combined impressionist and pointillist influences with an emphasis on luminous effects. In the Netherlands, painters like Jan Toorop explored light within diverse stylistic frameworks, including symbolism and early modernism. In Germany, Max Liebermann developed a personal luminism marked by vigorous brushwork and bright light.

In Spain, luminism flourished especially in Valencia and Catalonia. Its leading figure was Joaquín Sorolla, renowned for his mastery of Mediterranean light, particularly in seascapes painted outdoors with vibrant brushwork and high luminosity.

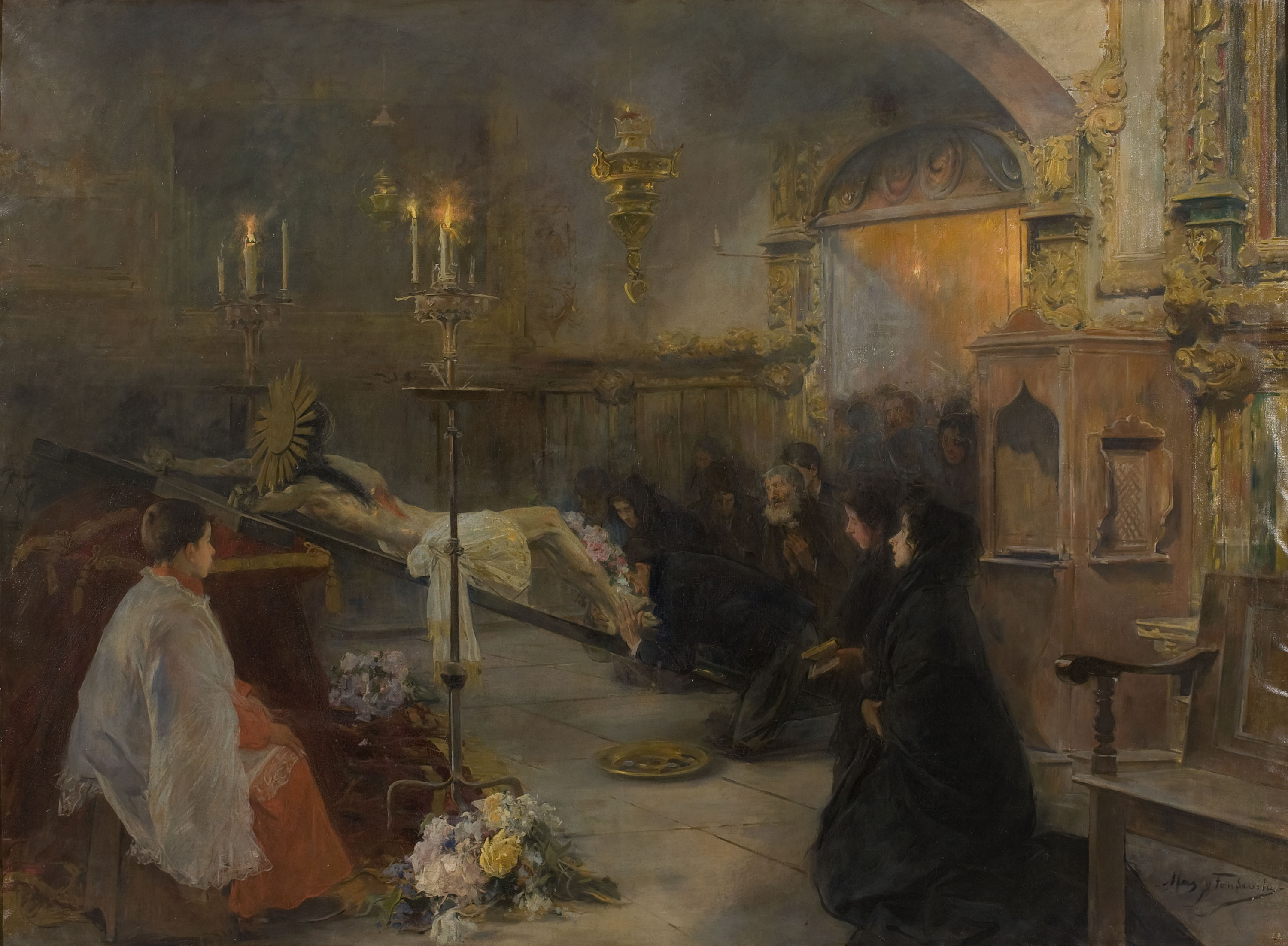
Venite adoremus (1896), by Arcadi Mas i Fondevila, Victor Balaguer Museum Library, Villanueva y Geltrú, Barcelona.

In Catalonia, the Sitges School, featuring artists such as Arcadi Mas i Fondevila and Joaquim de Miró, focused on capturing the intense coastal light, anticipating aspects of modernism.

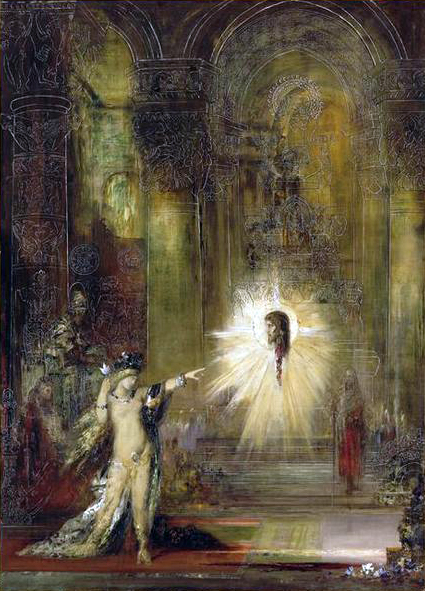
The Apparition (1874-1876), by Gustave Moreau, Musée Gustave Moreau, Paris

From the 1880s onward, symbolism emerged as a reaction against realism and impressionism. It emphasized imagination, dreams, and subjective experience, often exploring themes of mysticism, eroticism, and the unconscious. Linked to the idea of “art for art’s sake” formulated by Théophile Gautier, symbolism rejected naturalism and scientific objectivity. In symbolic art, light lost its descriptive function and became a vehicle for spiritual or emotional expression. It often appears as a transcendent or unreal illumination, suggesting inner states rather than external reality.

The movement originated in France with artists such as Gustave Moreau, Odilon Redon and Pierre Puvis de Chavannes. Moreau created richly colored, mystical compositions; Redon explored dreamlike and fantastical imagery; and Puvis developed a more restrained, allegorical style with simplified forms and muted tones. The group known as the Les Nabis further expanded symbolic language through expressive color and decorative composition.

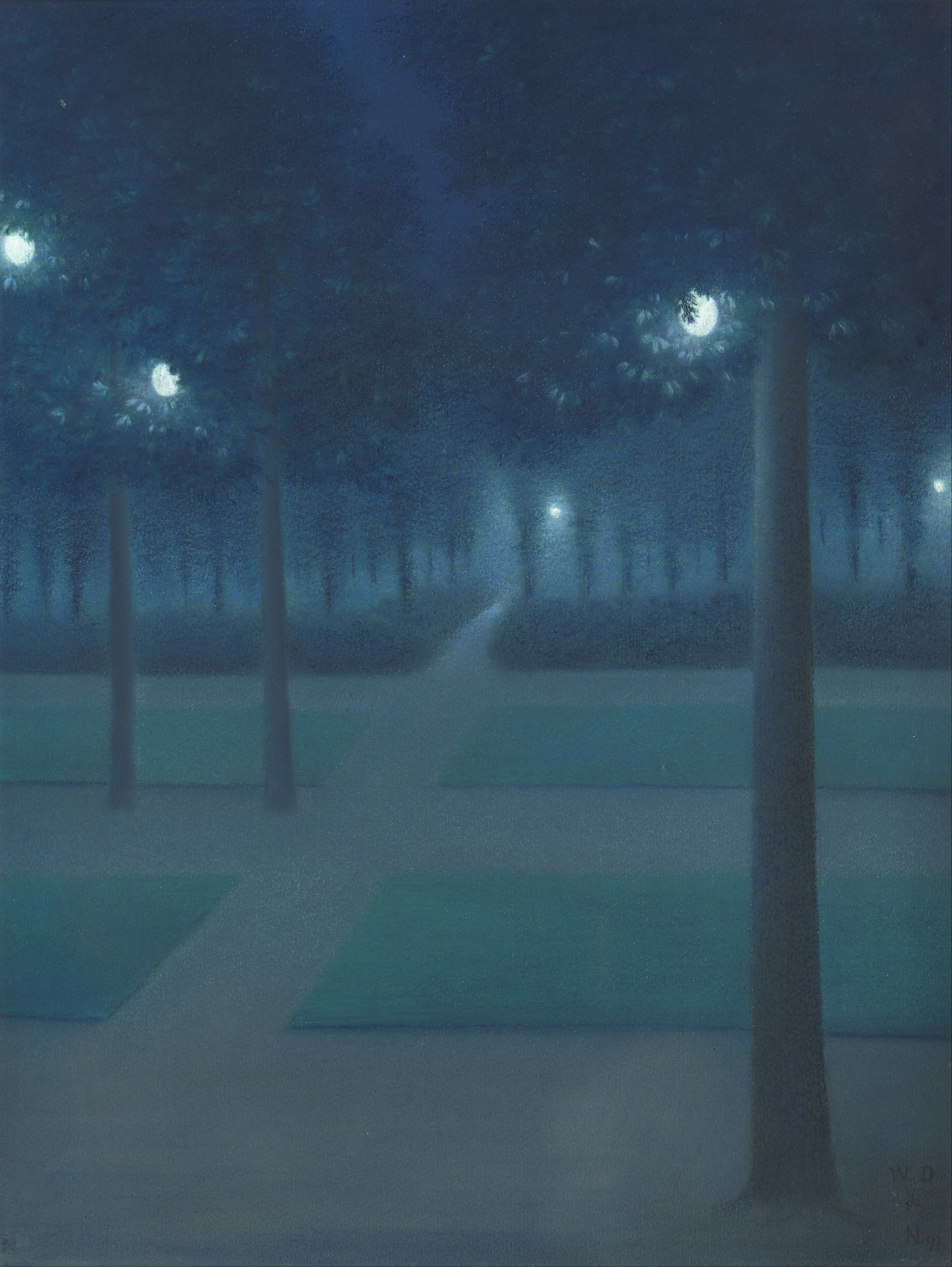
Nocturne in the Parc Royal de Bruxelles (1897), by William Degouve de Nuncques, Musée d'Orsay, Paris

In Belgium, symbolism was represented by Félicien Rops, Fernand Khnopff and William Degouve de Nuncques, whose works often featured dreamlike or nocturnal atmospheres. In Central Europe, Arnold Böcklin, Ferdinand Hodler and Gustav Klimt developed highly personal styles combining symbolism with decorative and expressive uses of light and color.

In Italy, Giuseppe Pellizza da Volpedo, explored symbolic meanings of light, often linked to social ideals. In Scandinavia, artists such as Vilhelm Hammershøi focused on quiet interior scenes where light defines mood and space.

Finally, naïf art ("naïve" in French) emerged as a parallel phenomenon, characterized by self-taught artists and a spontaneous, non-academic style. Its most notable representative, Henri Rousseau, employed flat perspectives and unreal lighting, influencing later avant-garde movements such as surrealism.

Sunrise, Yosemite Valley (1870), by Albert Bierstadt, Amon Carter Museum, Fort Worth, Texas

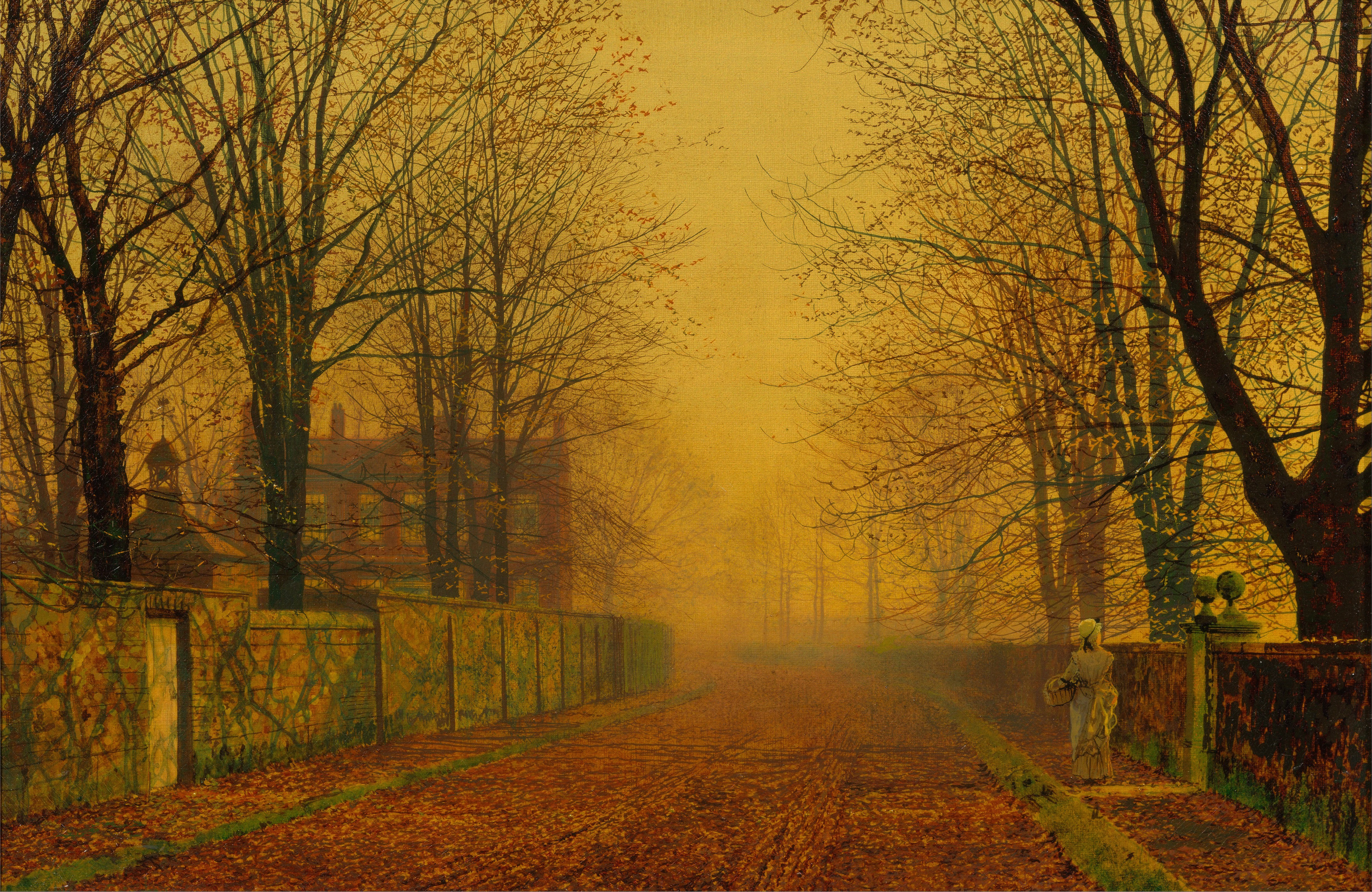
Evening Glow (1884), by John Atkinson Grimshaw, Yale Center for British Art, New Haven (Connecticut).

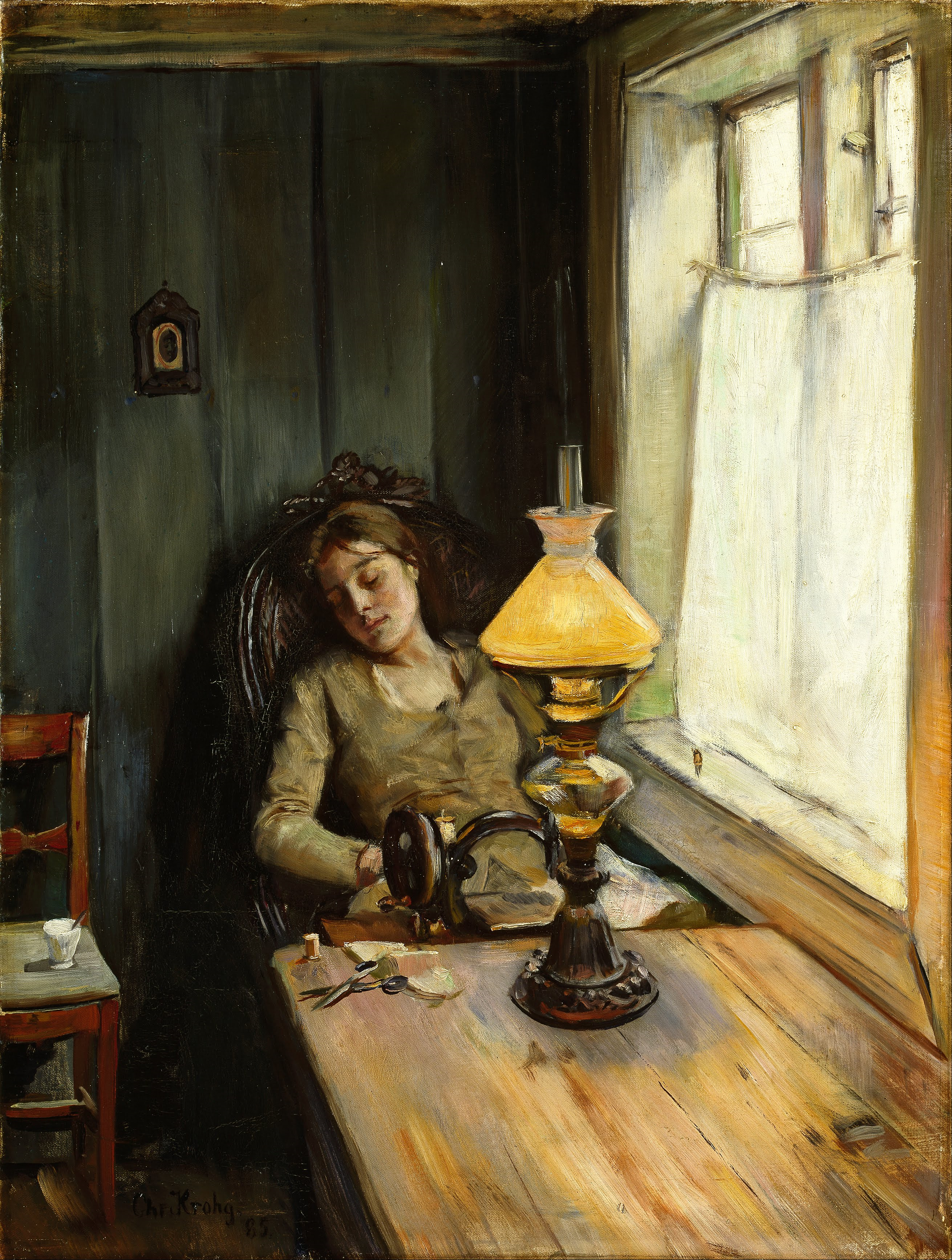
The Sleeping Seamstress (1885), by Christian Krohg, Nasjonalgalleriet, Oslo

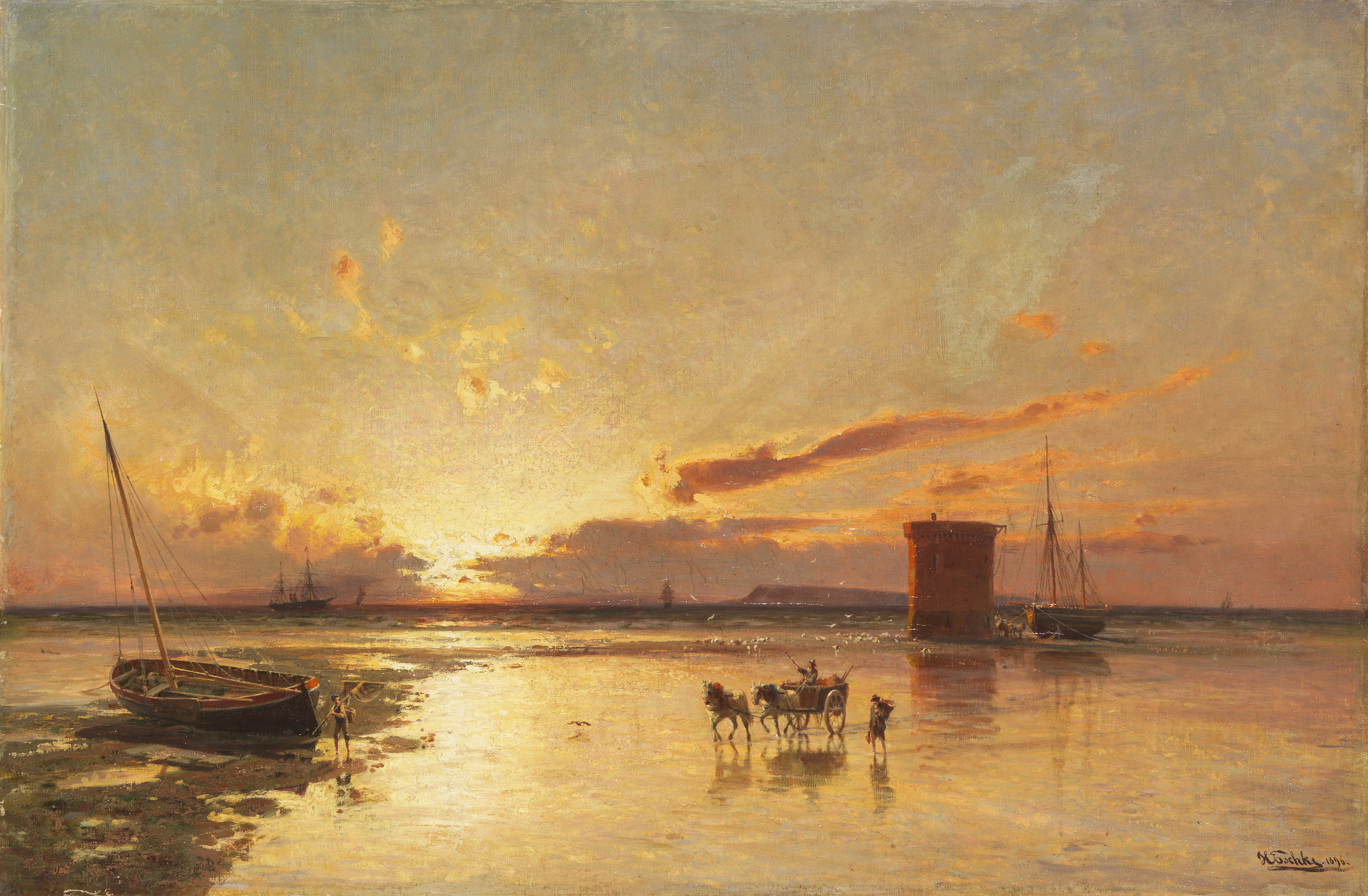
Martello Tower on the coast of Leith in Edinburgh (1896), by Hermann Eschke, private collection.

==== 20th Century ====
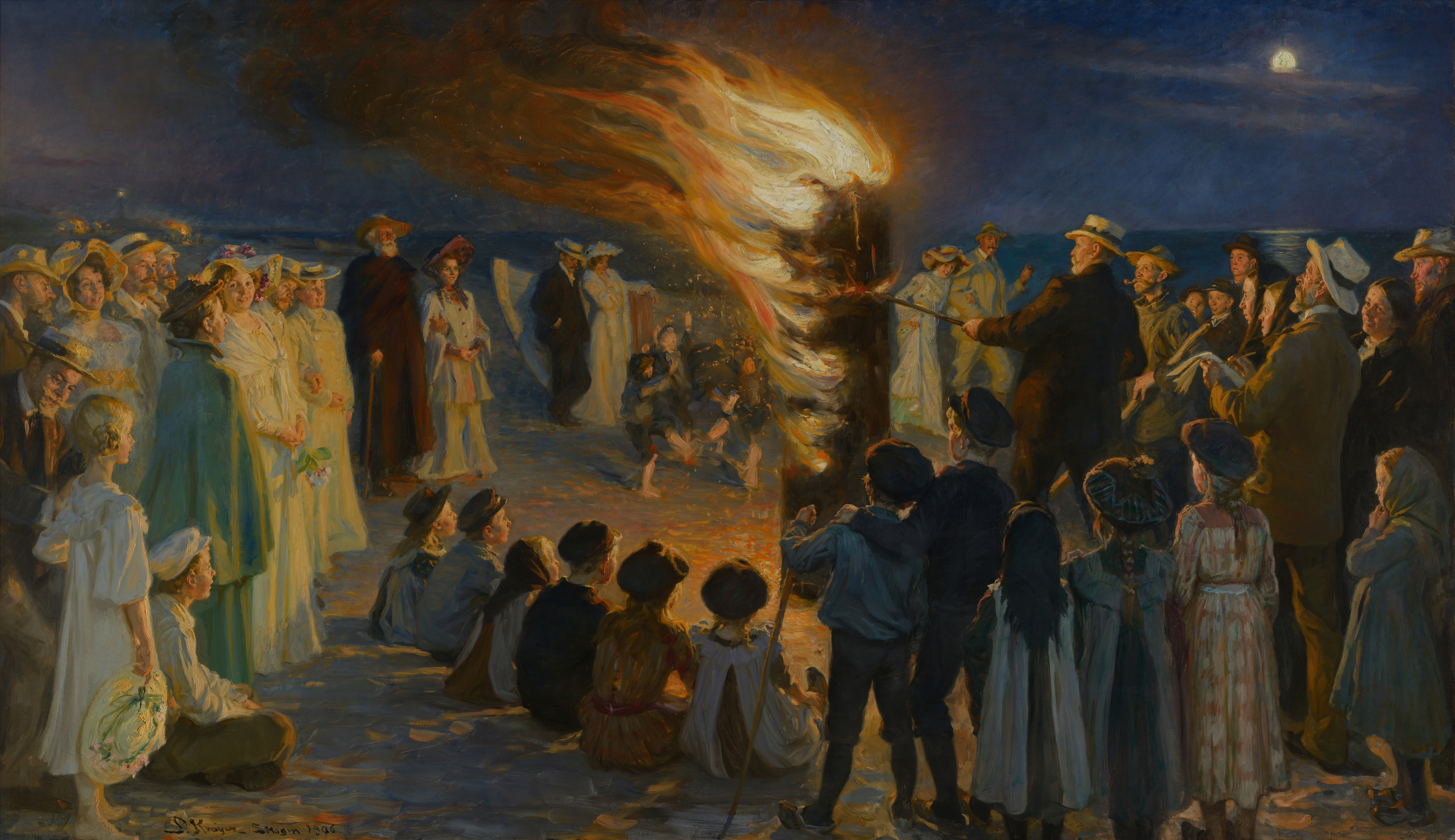
Midsummer Bonfire on Skagen Beach (1906), by Peder Severin Krøyer, Skagens Museum, Skagen

The art of the 20th century underwent a profound transformation: in a more materialistic, more consumerist society, art was directed to the senses, not to the intellect. The avant-garde movements arose, which sought to integrate art into society through a greater interrelation between artist and spectator, since it was the latter who interpreted the work, and could discover meanings that the artist did not even know. Avant-gardism rejected the traditional methods of optical representation – Renaissance perspective – to vindicate the two-dimensionality of painting and the autonomous character of the image, which implied the abandonment of space and light contrasts. In their place, light and shadow would no longer be instruments of a technique of spatial representation, but integral parts of the image, of the conception of the work as a homogeneous whole. On the other hand, other artistic methods such as photography, film and video had a notable influence on the art of this century, as well as, in relation to light, the installation, one of the variants of which is light art. On the other hand, the new interrelationship with the spectator means that the artist does not reflect what he sees, but lets the spectator see his vision of reality, which will be interpreted individually by each person.

Advances in artificial light (carbon and tungsten filaments, neon lights) led society in general to a new sensitivity to luminous impacts and, for artists in particular, to a new reflection on the technical and aesthetic properties of the new technological advances. Many artists of the new century experimented with all kinds of lights and their interrelation, such as the mixture and interweaving of natural and artificial lights, the control of the focal point, the dense atmospheres, the shaded or transparent colors and other types of sensorial experiences, already initiated by the impressionists but which in the new century acquired a category of their own.

===== Avant-garde =====
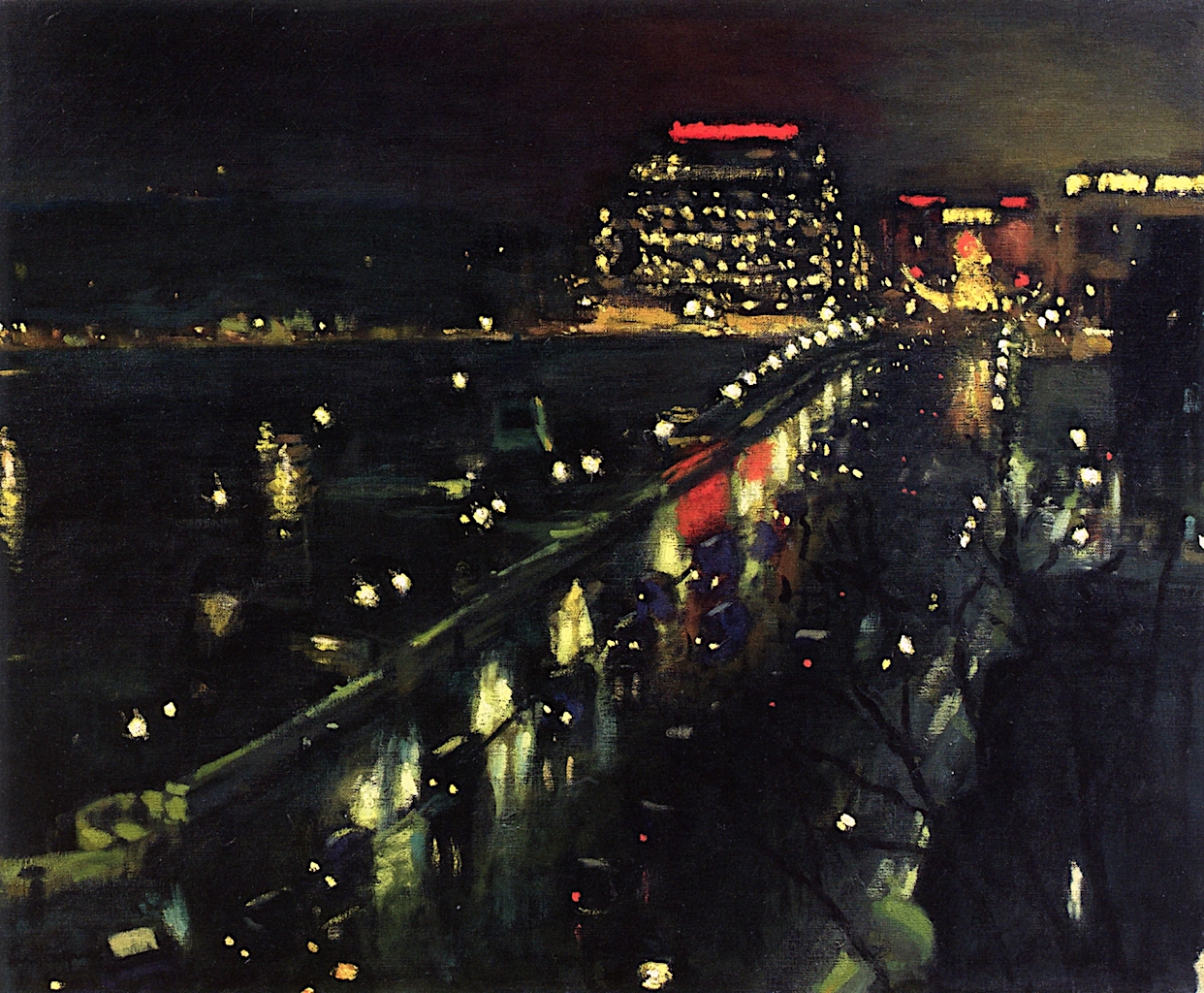
The Pont-Neuf by night (1935), by Albert Marquet, Centre Pompidou, Paris

The emergence of the avant-garde at the turn of the 20th century led to a rapid succession of movements, each with a distinct approach to light and color. Fauvism and Expressionism, heirs of post-impressionism, intensified chromatic saturation and contrast, while Cubism, Futurism, and Surrealism employed color subjectively, prioritizing expression over visual objectivity.

Fauvism (1904–1908) emphasized subjective and emotional uses of color, independent of natural appearance. Light was conceived as inherent to color itself, eliminating shadows and producing radiant luminosity through contrasts of pure pigments. Its main figures included Henri Matisse, Albert Marquet, Raoul Dufy, André Derain, Maurice de Vlaminck and Kees van Dongen. Matisse developed a conception of light as an expressive function of color, evident in Luxury, Calm and Voluptuousness (1904). A related figure, Pierre Bonnard, explored luminous effects in intimate interiors.

Expressionism arose in opposition to impressionism, prioritizing subjective expression over visual perception. Light became conceptual, reflecting the artist’s inner world rather than physical reality. Precursors includedEdvard Munch and James Ensor. It developed in groups such as Die Brücke and Der Blaue Reiter, alongside figures like Egon Schiele, Oskar Kokoschka, Amedeo Modigliani, Marc Chagall, Georges Rouault, and Chaïm Soutine.

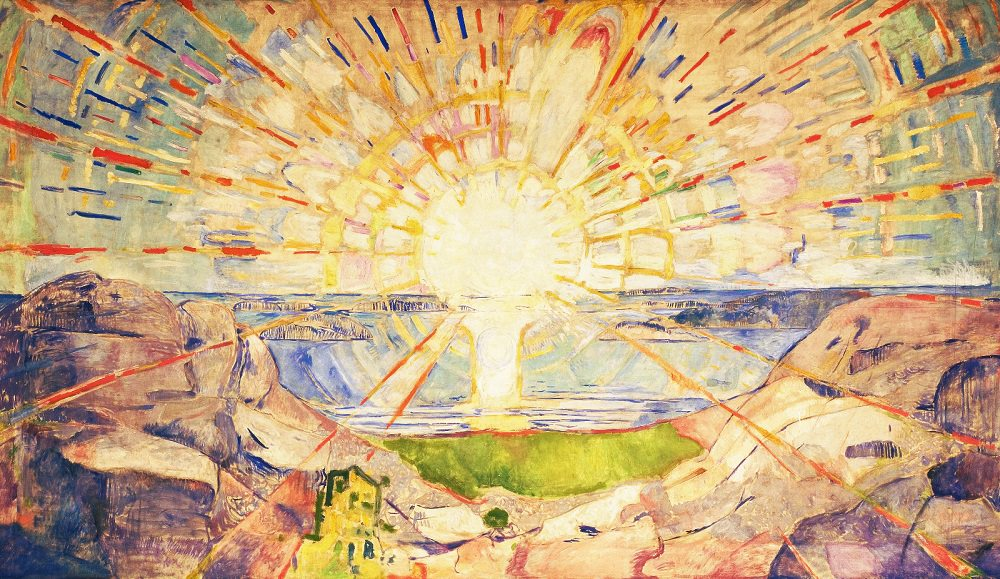
The Sun (1910-1911), by Edvard Munch, University of Oslo

Cubism (1907–1914) rejected Renaissance perspective, organizing space through geometric planes and assigning independent luminosity to each surface. Its principal exponents were Pablo Picasso, Georges Braque, Jean Metzinger, Albert Gleizes, Juan Gris, and Fernand Léger. Light lost its natural source and became a constructive element within the composition.

A derivative of cubism, Orphism, was represented by Robert Delaunay, who explored the decomposition of light into chromatic rhythms, leading toward abstraction.

Futurism (1909–1930) emphasized movement, speed, and modernity, treating light in increasingly abstract terms. Its main figures included Giacomo Balla, Gino Severini, Carlo Carrà and Umberto Boccioni, who associated light with dynamic and psychological experience.

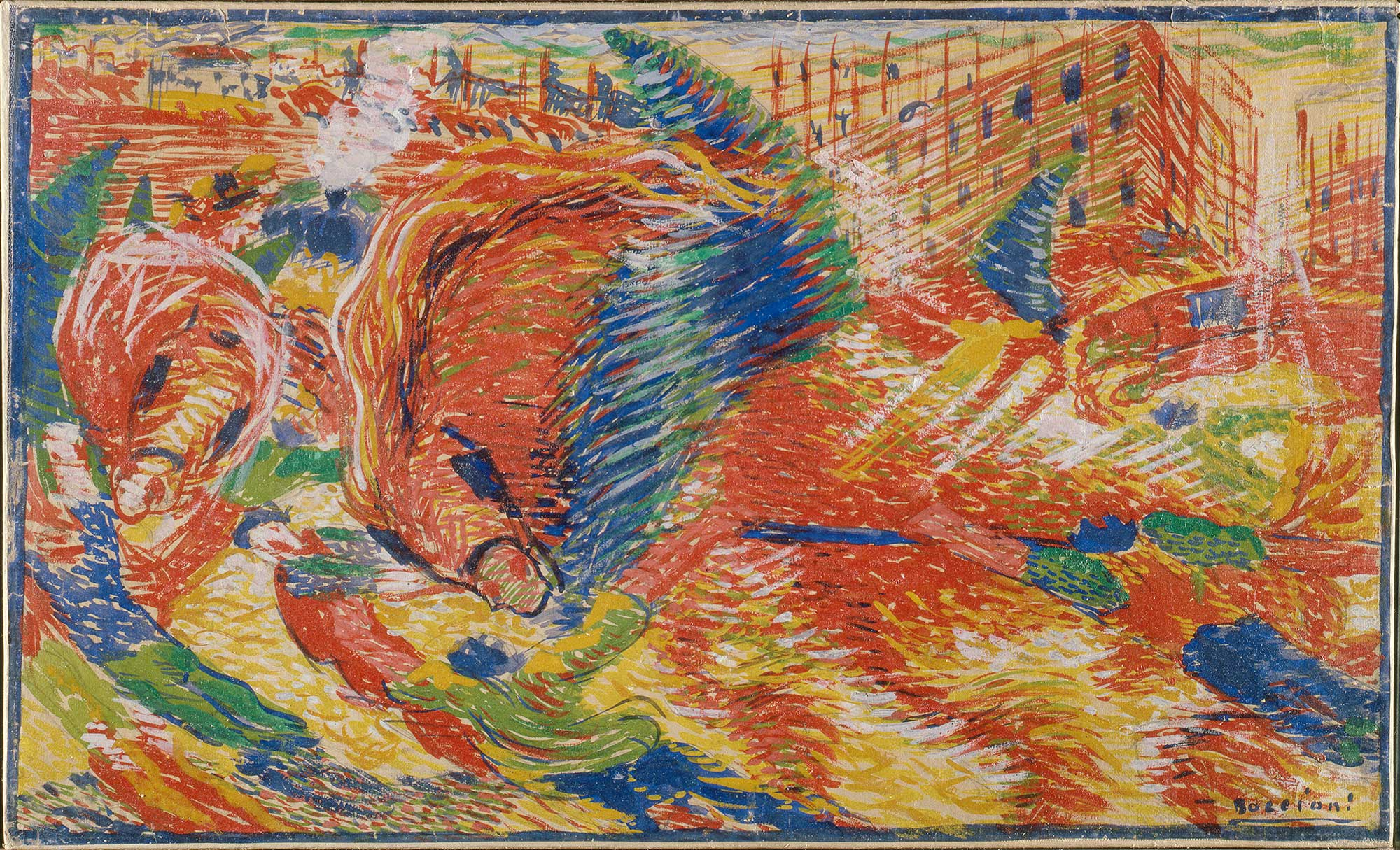
The City Rises (1910-1911), by Umberto Boccioni, Museum of Modern Art, New York

In Italy, Metaphysical Painting anticipated surrealism. Giorgio de Chirico created static, dreamlike spaces with uniform illumination and elongated shadows, while Giorgio Morandi emphasized subtle chiaroscuro in still lifes.

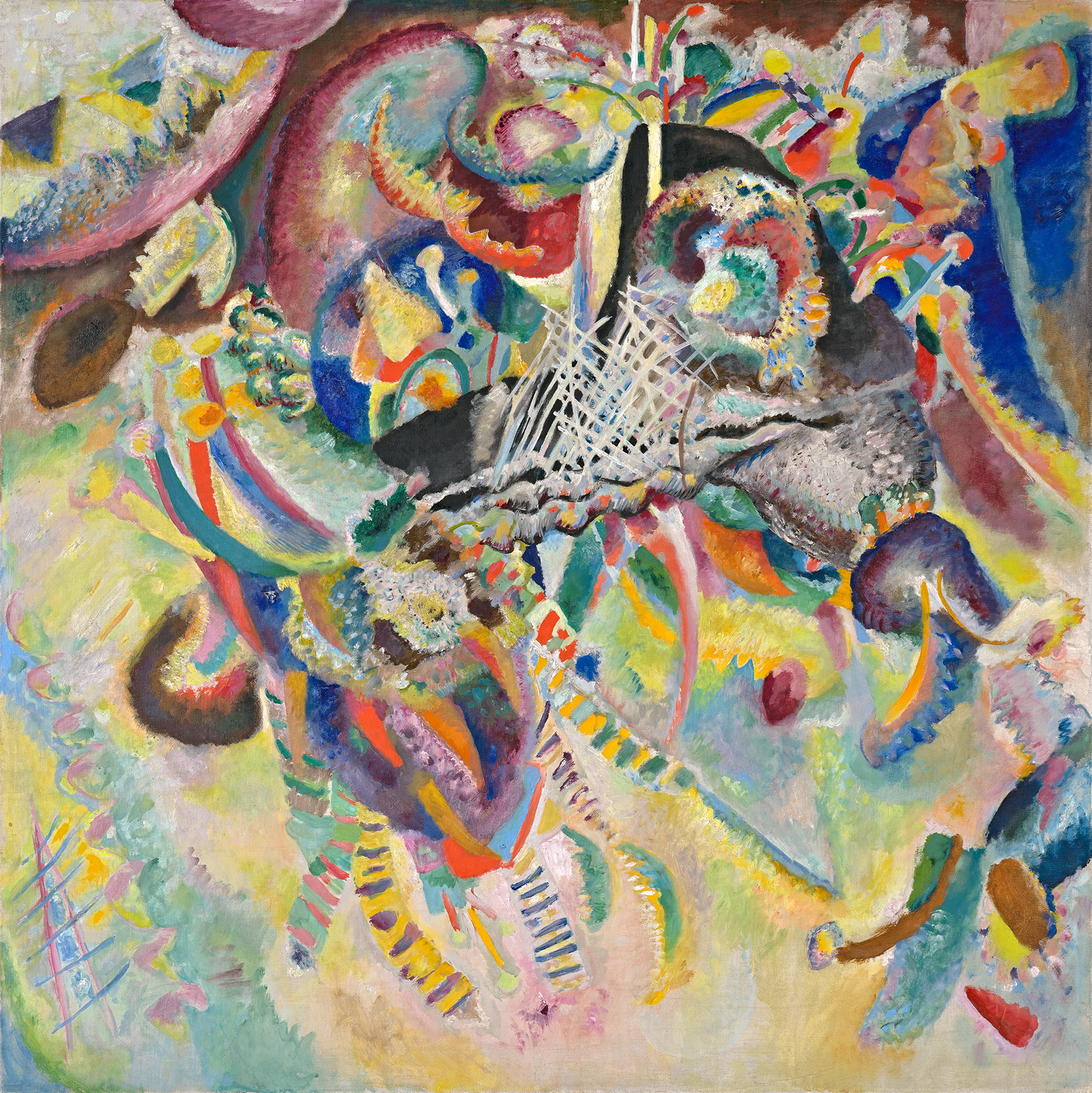
Fugue (1914), by Vasili Kandinski, Fondation Beyeler, Riehen (Switzerland)

With Abstract art, initiated by Wassily Kandinsky, painting abandoned representation in favor of subjective expression. Movements such as De Stijl and Suprematism, represented by Piet Mondrian, Theo Van Doesburg, and Kazimir Malevich, explored color and form as autonomous elements. Light persisted as tonal and chromatic relationships rather than natural illumination, later evident in artists such as Mark Rothko.

In interwar Germany, New Objectivity returned to realism while incorporating avant-garde techniques. Artists such as Otto Dix, George Grosz, and Max Beckmann depicted urban environments with artificial lighting.

Surrealism (1924–1955) explored dreams and the unconscious, combining realistic and abstract approaches. Figures included Salvador Dalí, Paul Delvaux, René Magritte, Max Ernst, Joan Miró, André Masson, Yves Tanguy, and Paul Klee. Light was often paradoxical or symbolic, as in Magritte’s The Empire of Lights. Dalí employed intense Mediterranean illumination with dramatic contrasts, while Miró developed a poetic, often nocturnal luminosity.

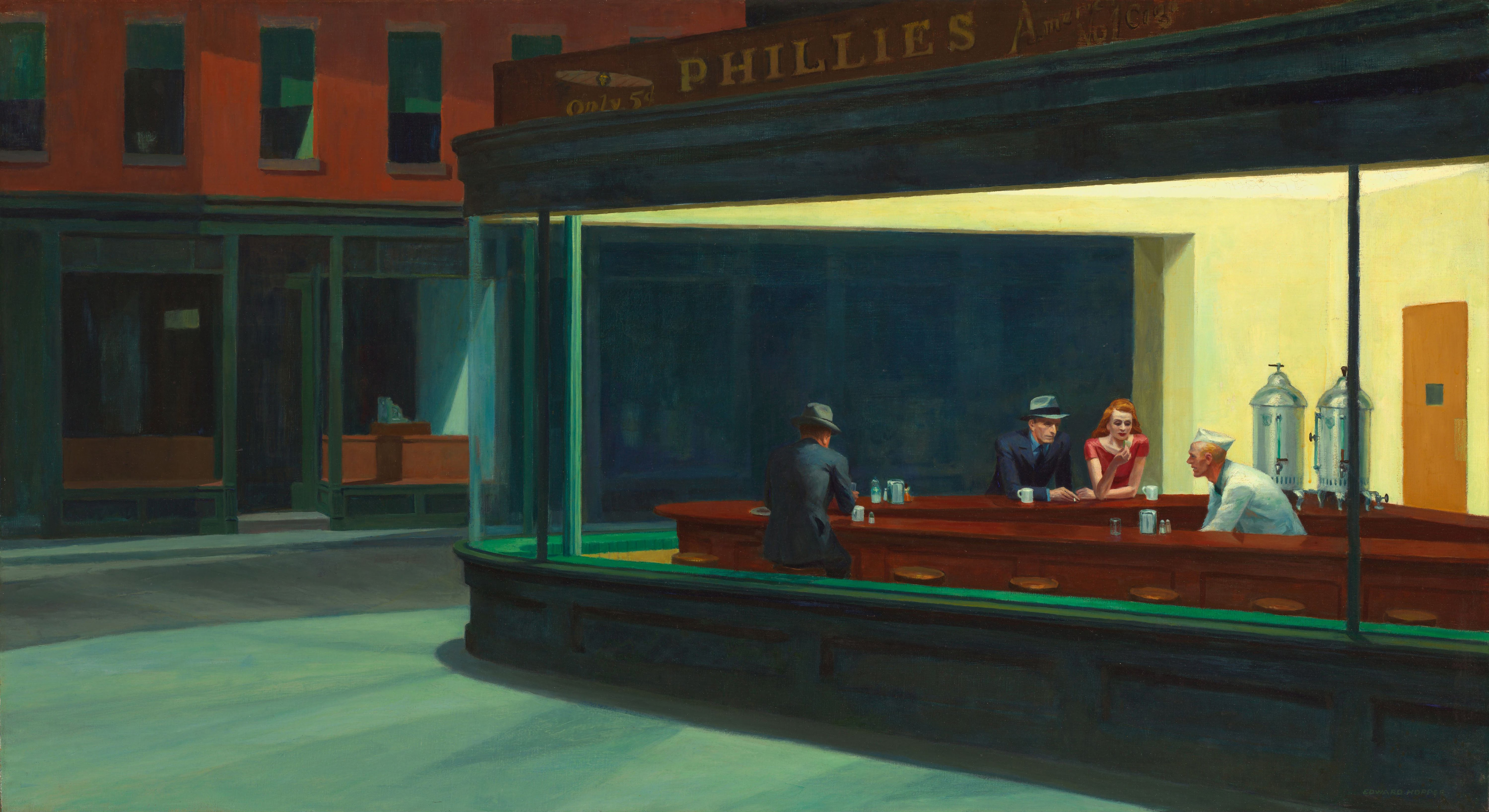
Noctambulists (1942), Edward Hopper, Art Institute of Chicago

In the United States, urban realism movements such as the Ashcan School, led by Robert Henri, and later American Scene painting, represented by Edward Hopper, focused on modern life. Hopper, in particular, used sharp contrasts of light and shadow to convey isolation and psychological tension, often depicting artificial illumination in urban settings.

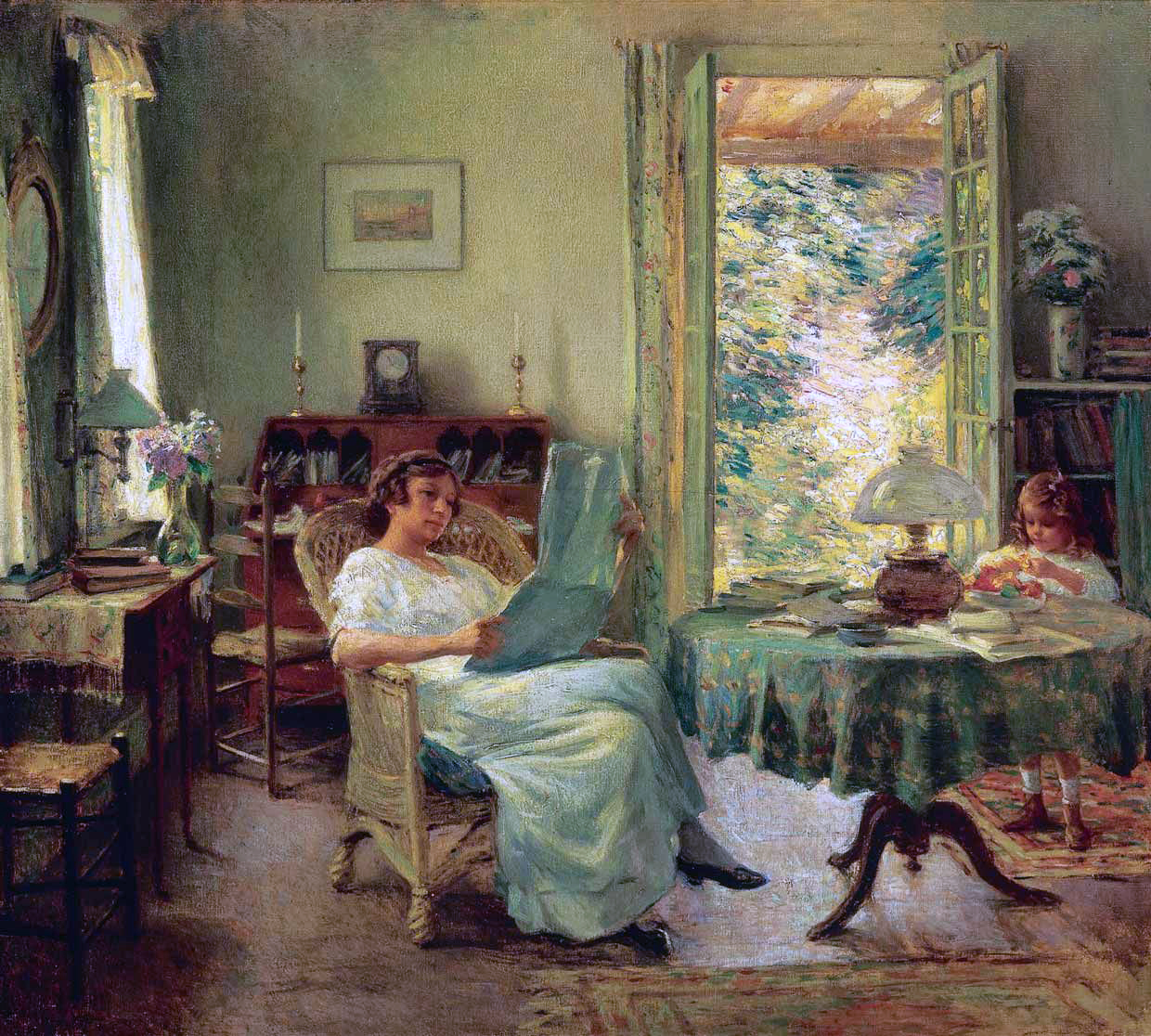
Summer at Headlyme (1900), by Willard Leroy Metcalf

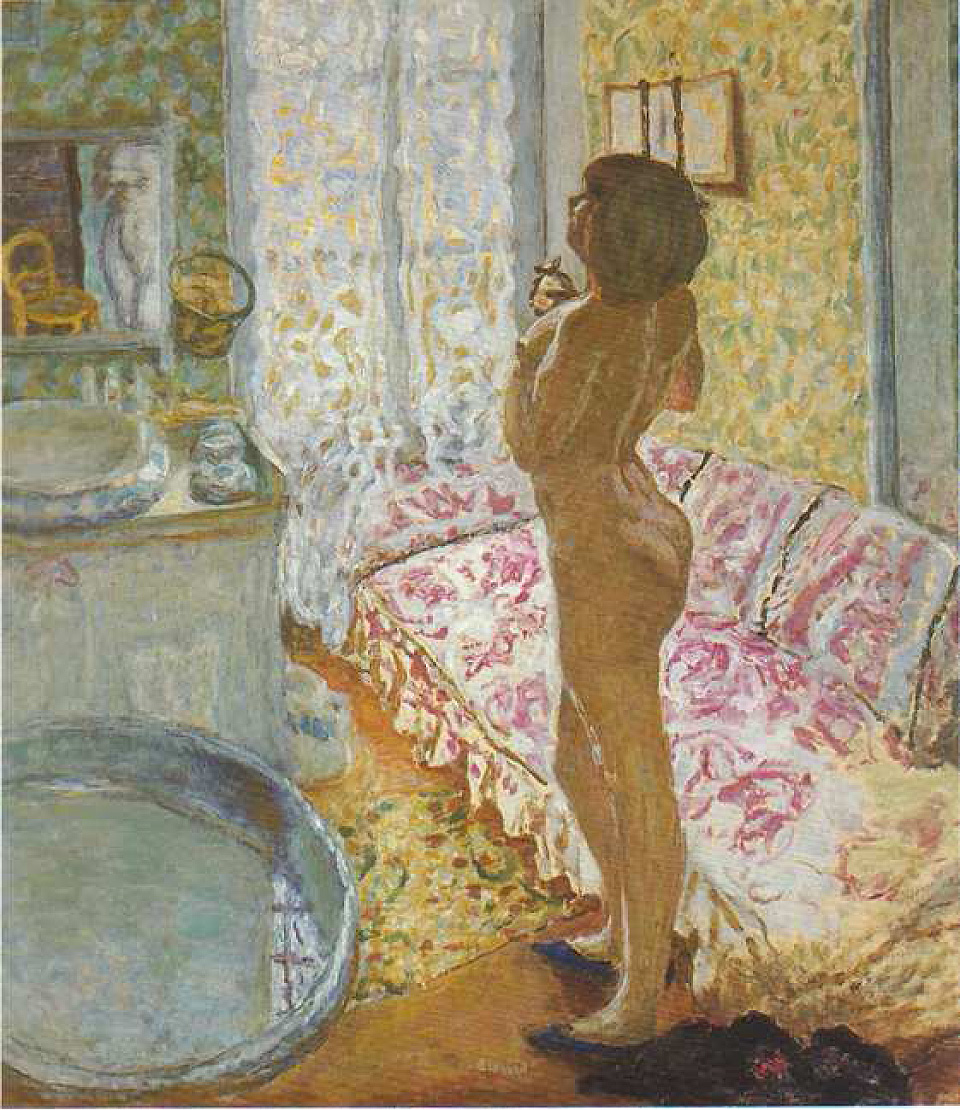
Desnudo a contraluz (1908), by Pierre Bonnard, Royal Museums of Fine Arts, Bruselas

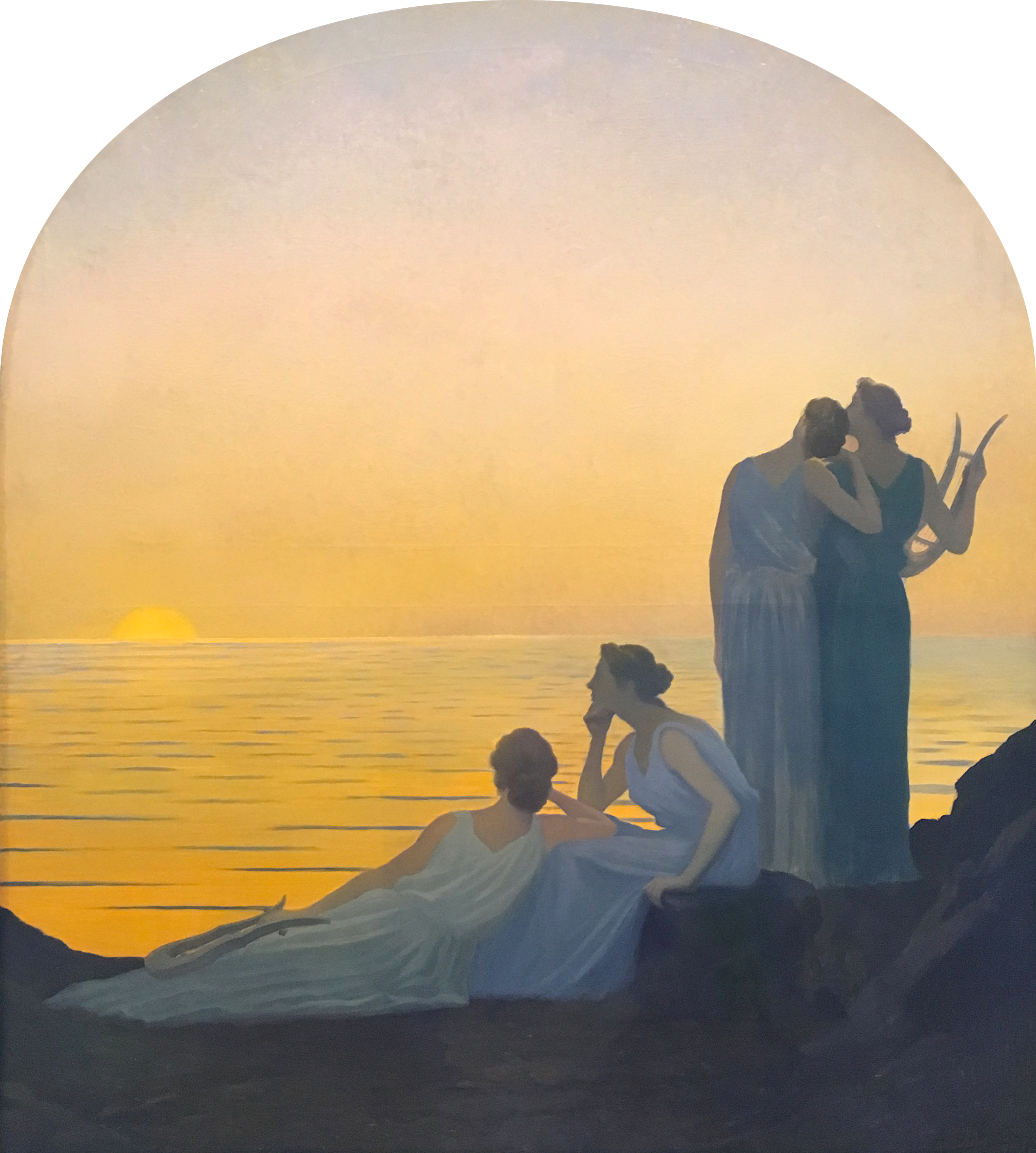
Old Afternoon (1908), by Alphonse Osbert, Petit Palais, Paris

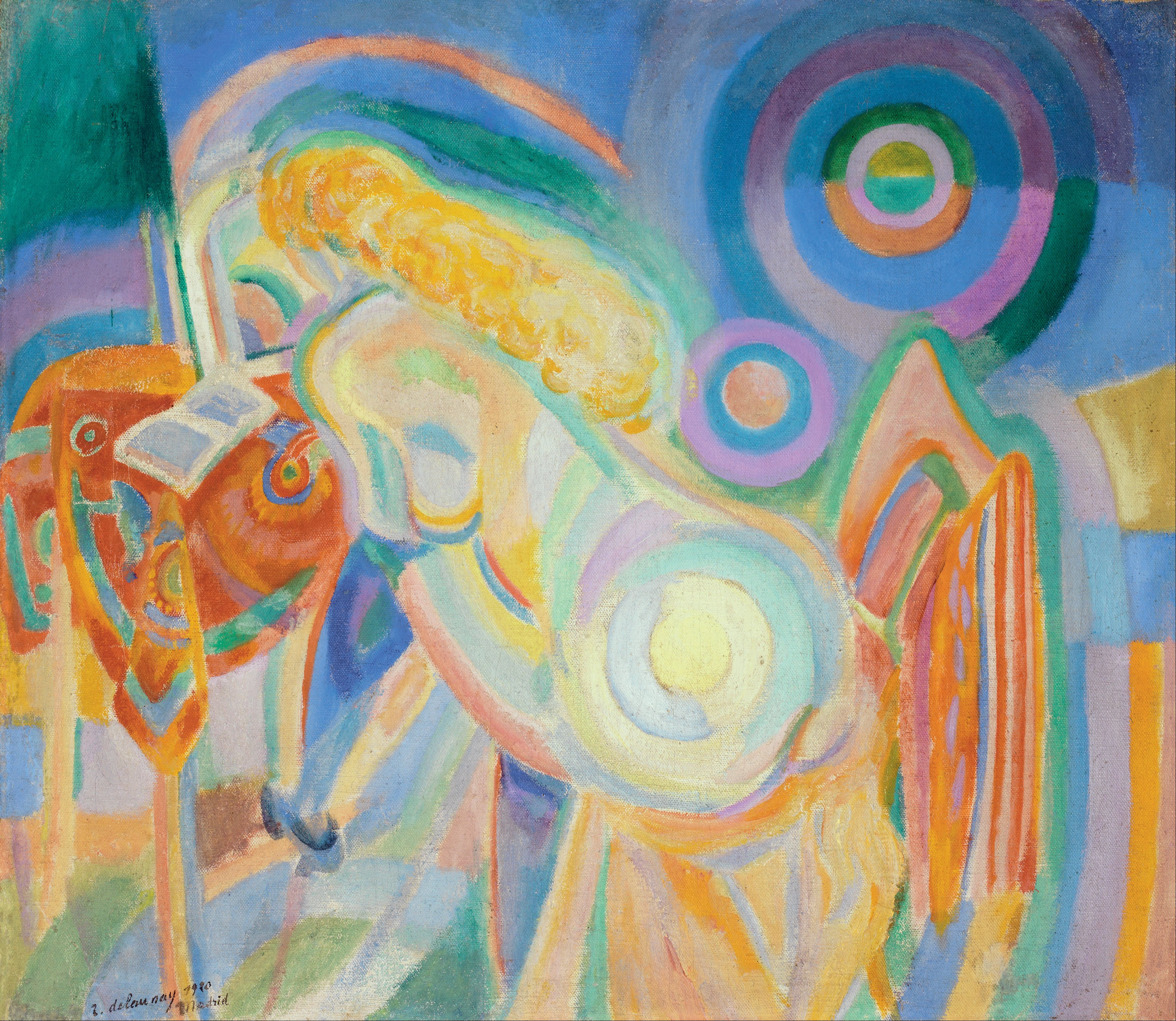
Nude Woman Reading (1920), by Robert Delaunay, Museo de Bellas Artes de Bilbao

===== Latest trends =====
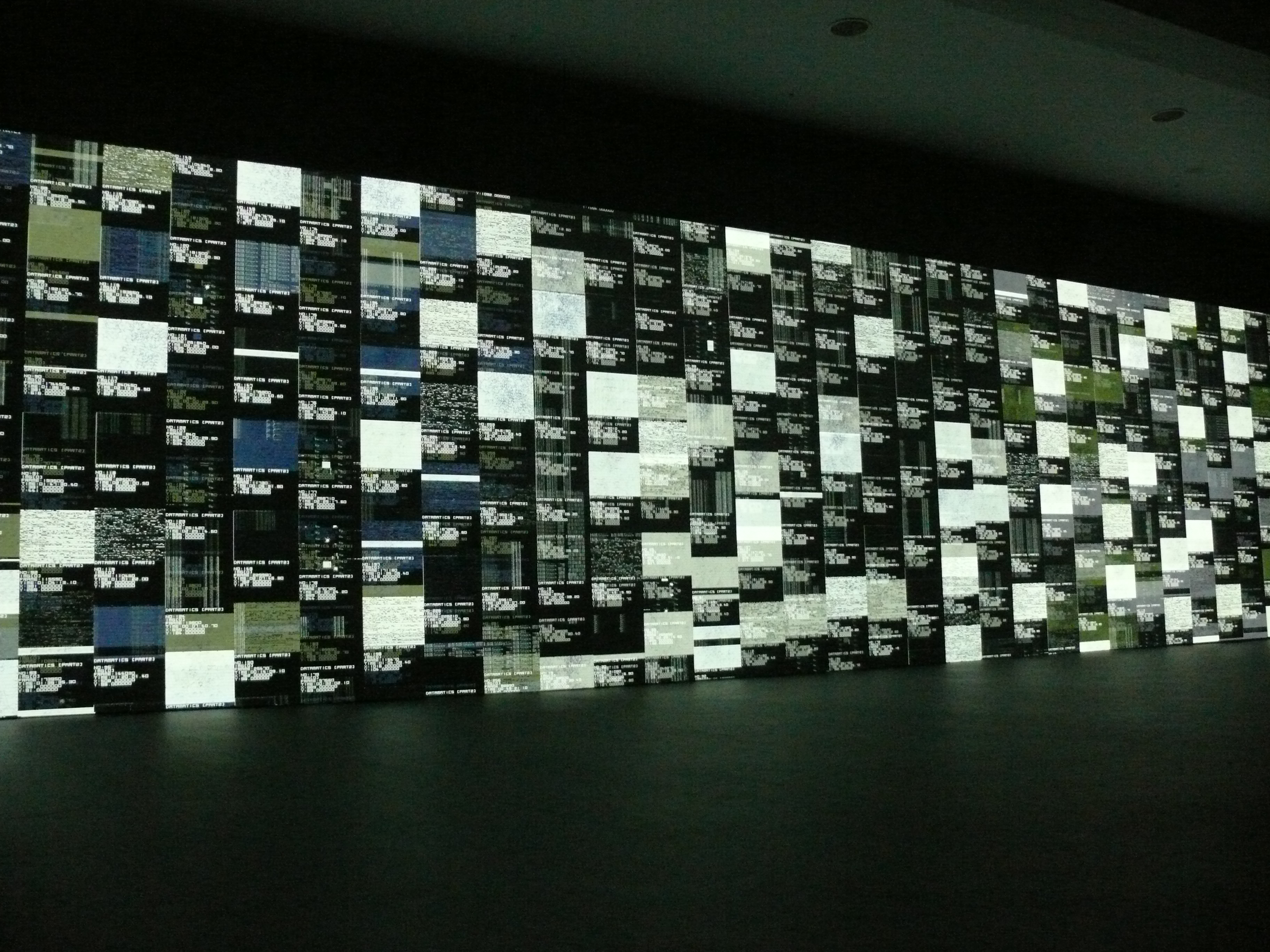
Data.Tron [8K Enhanced Version] by Ryoji Ikeda on show in transmediale 10.

Since World War II, art has developed rapidly, with successive movements exploring new approaches to light and form. The modern project of the avant-garde culminated in anti-material tendencies such as Conceptual art and action art, which prioritized ideas over material execution. This was followed by a return to traditional forms in Postmodern art, characterized by stylistic plurality, the recovery of craftsmanship, and the abandonment of utopian ambitions.

The first postwar movements were abstract, notably Abstract Expressionism and Art Informel (1945-1960). These currents emphasized spontaneity and materiality, rejecting structure and rational composition. In Abstract Expressionism, artists such as Jackson Pollock and Mark Rothko explored light through technique: Pollock’s dripping created metallic luminosity, while Rothko’s layered color fields generated depth through transparency. Informel included tendencies such as tachism, art brut, and matter painting, with figures like Georges Mathieu, Hans Hartung, Jean Fautrier, Jean Dubuffet, Lucio Fontana and Antoni Tàpies who emphasized texture and material effects.

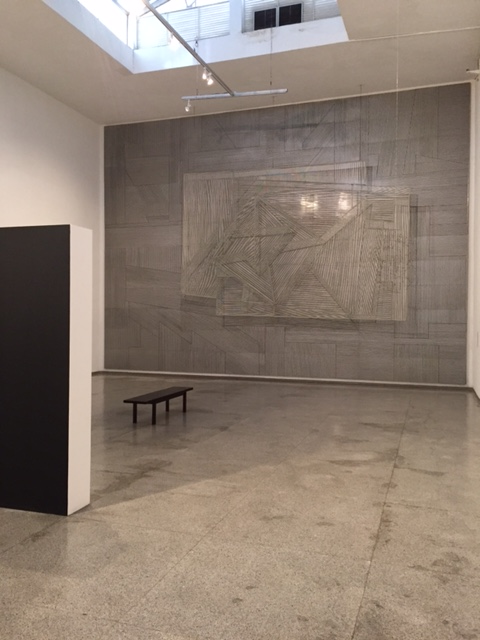
Brussels Mural, Jesús Soto (1958). Museo de Bellas Artes de Caracas.

Op-art focused on optical perception and light effects through illusion and movement. Its main exponents, such as Victor Vasarely, Jesús Rafael Soto and Yaacov Agam, used industrial materials and vibrant contrasts, treating light, space, and motion as primary artistic elements.

Among figurative trends, Pop art (1955-1970) reacted against abstraction by reintroducing imagery from mass culture. Artists such as Roy Lichtenstein, Tom Wesselmann, James Rosenquist, and Andy Warhol employed flat, bright colors and mechanical techniques, often derived from advertising and comics.

Abstraction re-emerged between the 1960s and 1980s in Post-painterly abstraction and Minimalism. The former emphasized geometric clarity and chromatic impact, with artists such as Barnett Newman, Frank Stella, Ellsworth Kelly and Kenneth Noland. Minimalism reduced form to essential elements, often using monochrome surfaces, as seen in Robert Mangold and Robert Ryman.

Figuration returned with hyperrealism, which pursued extreme visual accuracy and often emphasized reflections and artificial light. Its main representatives include Chuck Close, Richard Estes, Don Eddy, John Salt, and Ralph Goings. A related figure, Antonio López García, combined precise realism with subtle atmospheric effects.

Neo-luminism revisited 19th-century luminism, emphasizing atmospheric light and subtle tonal gradations. Artists such as April Gornik and Steven DaLuz focused on serene landscapes and refined light effects.

From the mid-1970s, Postmodern art became dominant. Rejecting the universal ambitions of the avant-garde, it embraced stylistic plurality, appropriation, and self-referentiality. Notable figures include Jeff Koons, David Salle, Jean-Michel Basquiat, Keith Haring, Julian Schnabel, Eric Fischl, and Miquel Barceló, as well as movements such as the Transavantgarde and Neo-Expressionism.

== See also ==
- Light art
- Light painting
- History of painting
- Periods in Western art history

== Bibliography ==
- ABC de la pintura. Barcelona: Cúpula. 2002. ISBN 84-329-2439-3.
- Albert de Paco, José María (2007). El arte de reconocer los estilos arquitectónicos. Barcelona: Óptima. ISBN 978-84-96250-72-7.
- Antonio, Trinidad de (1989). El siglo XVII español. Madrid: Historia 16.
- Arnaldo, Javier (1989). El movimiento romántico. Madrid: Historia 16.
- Arnheim, Rudolf (2002). Arte y percepción visual. Madrid: Alianza. ISBN 84-206-7874-0.
- Arpino, Giovanni; Lecaldano, Paolo (1988). La obra pictórica completa de Rembrandt. Barcelona: Planeta. ISBN 84-320-2853-3.
- Asunción, Josep (2002). Luz y color. Barcelona: Parramón. ISBN 84-342-2472-0.
- Azcárate Ristori, José María de; Pérez Sánchez, Alfonso Emilio; Ramírez Domínguez, Juan Antonio (1983). Historia del Arte. Madrid: Anaya. ISBN 84-207-1408-9.
- Beardsley, Monroe C.; Hospers, John (1990). Estética. Historia y fundamentos. Madrid: Cátedra. ISBN 84-376-0085-5.
- Becker, Udo (1996). Enciclopedia de los símbolos. Barcelona: Robin Book. ISBN 84-7927-169-8.
- Biedermann, Hans (1993). Diccionario de símbolos. Barcelona: Paidós. ISBN 84-7509-955-6.
- Bockemühl, Michael (1992). J. M. W. Turner. Köln: Taschen. ISBN 3-8228-0669-2.
- Borrás Gualis, Gonzalo M.; Esteban Lorente, Juan Francisco; Álvaro Zamora, Isabel (2010). Introducción general al arte. Madrid: Akal. ISBN 978-84-7090-107-2.
- Bozal, Valeriano (1989). Goya. Entre Neoclasicismo y Romanticismo. Madrid: Historia 16.
- Bozal, Valeriano (2000). Historia de las ideas estéticas y de las teorías artísticas contemporáneas (vol. I). Madrid: Visor. ISBN 84-7774-580-3.
- Bozal, Valeriano (1989). Los orígenes del arte del siglo XX. Madrid: Historia 16.
- Braunstein, Mercedes; Martín Roig, Gabriel (2010). Luz y sombra. Barcelona: Parramón. ISBN 978-84-342-3761-2.
- Calzada Echevarría, Andrés (2003). Diccionario clásico de arquitectura y bellas artes. Barcelona: Serbal. ISBN 84-7628-406-3.
- Cantera Montenegro, Jesús (1989). El clasicismo francés. Madrid: Historia 16.
- Castria Marchetti, Francesca; Giorgi, Rosa; Zuffi, Stefano (2005). El Barroco. 1600-1770: El arte europeo de Caravaggio a Tiepolo. Milan: Mondadori Electa. ISBN 84-8156-391-9.
- Chevalier, Jean; Gheerbrant, Alain (1999). Diccionario de los símbolos. Barcelona: Herder. ISBN 84-254-1514-4.
- Chilvers, Ian (2007). Diccionario de arte. Madrid: Alianza Editorial. ISBN 978-84-206-6170-4.
- Cirlot, Lourdes (1990). Las últimas tendencias pictóricas. Barcelona: Vicens-Vives. ISBN 84-316-2726-3.
- Ciscar Casabán, Consuelo (2004). De Chirico. Milan: Rizzoli/Skira-Corriere della Sera. ISBN 84-96507-94-7.
- Clark, Kenneth (1971). El arte del paisaje. Barcelona: Seix Barral.
- Clark, Kenneth (1996). El desnudo. Un estudio de la forma ideal. Madrid: Alianza. ISBN 84-206-7018-9.
- Coll, Isabel; Sella, Antoni; Sierra, Roland (2002). L'escola luminista de Sitges (in Catalan). Barcelona, Sitges: Diputació de Barcelona, Ajuntament de Sitges, Consorci del Patrimoni de Sitges. ISBN 84-607-3769-1.
- Crepaldi, Gabriele (2005). El siglo XIX. Milan: Electa. ISBN 84-8156-380-3.
- Cumming, Robert (1997). Guía visual de pintura y arquitectura. Madrid: Ediciones El País/Santillana.
- de la Plaza Escudero, Lorenzo; Morales Gómez, Adoración (2015). Diccionario visual de términos de arte. Madrid: Cátedra. ISBN 978-84-376-3441-8.
- Dempsey, Amy (2002). Estilos, escuelas y movimientos. Barcelona: Blume. ISBN 84-89396-86-8.
- Diccionario Enciclopédico Larousse. Barcelona: Planeta. 1990. ISBN 84-320-6070-4.
- Diccionario Larousse de la Pintura. Barcelona: Planeta-Agostini. 1988. ISBN 84-395-0976-6.
- Eco, Umberto (2004). Historia de la belleza. Barcelona: Lumen. ISBN 84-264-1468-0.
- Eco, Umberto; Calabrese, Omar (1987). El tiempo en la pintura. Madrid: Mondadori. ISBN 84-397-1143-3.
- Enciclopedia del Arte Garzanti. Madrid: Ediciones B. 1991. ISBN 84-406-2261-9.
- Faerna García-Bermejo, José María (1995). Antonio López. Madrid: Globus. ISBN 84-8223-088-3.
- Fahr-Becker, Gabriele (2008). El modernismo. Potsdam: Ullmann. ISBN 978-3-8331-6377-7.
- Fernández Arenas, José (1988). Arte efímero y espacio estético. Barcelona: Anthropos. ISBN 84-7658-078-9.
- Fernández Polanco, Aurora (1989). Fin de siglo: Simbolismo y Art Nouveau. Madrid: Historia 16.
- Ferrater Mora, José (1991). Diccionario de filosofía 3 K-P. Barcelona: Círculo de Lectores. ISBN 84-226-3694-8.
- Fuga, Antonella (2004). Técnicas y materiales del arte. Barcelona: Electa. ISBN 84-8156-377-3.
- Gala, Antonio; Martínez-Novillo, Álvaro; Triadó, Juan-Ramón (1998). La luz en la pintura. Barcelona: Carroggio.
- García Felguera, María Santos (1989). El arte después de Auschwitz. Madrid: Historia 16.
- Giorgi, Rosa (2007). El siglo XVII. Barcelona: Electa. ISBN 978-84-8156-420-4.
- Gombrich, Ernst (1985). El legado de Apeles. Madrid: Alianza. ISBN 84-206-7023-5.
- González, Antonio Manuel (1991). Las claves del arte. Últimas tendencias. Barcelona: Planeta. ISBN 84-320-9702-0.
- González Prieto, Antonio (2006). Rubens. Barcelona: Sol90. ISBN 978-84-9820-358-5.
- González Prieto, Antonio; Tello, Antonio (2006). Caravaggio. Barcelona: Sol90. ISBN 978-84-9820-363-9.
- Hagen, Rose-Marie & Rainer (2005). Los secretos de las obras de arte. Köln: Taschen. ISBN 978-3-8228-4788-6.
- Hamilton, George Heard (1989). Pintura y escultura en Europa 1880/1940. Madrid: Cátedra. ISBN 84-376-0230-0.
- Hernández Perera, Jesús (1989). El Cinquecento y el manierismo en Italia. Madrid: Historia 16.
- Honour, Hugh; Fleming, John (2002). Historia mundial del arte. Madrid: Akal. ISBN 84-460-2092-0.
- Lucie-Smith, Edward (1984). Diccionario de términos artísticos. Barcelona: Destino. ISBN 84-233-2858-9.
- Martínez Ripoll, Antonio (1989). El Barroco en Europa. Madrid: Historia 16.
- Martínez Ripoll, Antonio (1989). El Barroco en Italia. Madrid: Historia 16.
- Medina de Vargas, Raquel (1988). La luz en la pintura. Un factor plástico: el siglo XVII. Barcelona: PPU. ISBN 84-7665-387-5.
- Miguel Egea, Pilar de (1989). Del Realismo al Impresionismo. Madrid: Historia 16.
- Morán Turina, Miguel (2004). Tiziano. Milan: Rizzoli/Skira-Corriere della Sera. ISBN 84-89780-62-5.
- Morante, Elsa; Baldini, Umberto (1988). La obra pictórica completa de Fra Angélico. Barcelona: Planeta. ISBN 84-320-2858-4.
- Navarro, Mariano (1999). La luz y las sombras en la pintura española. Madrid: Espasa. ISBN 84-239-8599-7.
- Néret, Gilles (2000). Dalí. Colonia (Alemania): Taschen. ISBN 3-8228-6550-8.
- Newall, Diana (2009). Apreciar el arte. Barcelona: Blume. ISBN 978-84-9801-362-7.
- Nieto, Víctor; Cámara, Alicia (1989). El Quattrocento italiano. Madrid: Historia 16.
- Nieto Alcaide, Víctor (1978). La luz, símbolo y sistema visual. Madrid: Cátedra. ISBN 84-376-0125-8.
- Novak, Barbara; Manthorne, Katherine E.; García Felguera, María de los Santos (2000). Explorar el Edén. Paisaje americano del siglo XIX. Madrid: Fundación Colección Thyssen-Bornemisza. ISBN 84-88474-71-7.
- Novotny, Fritz (1981). Pintura y escultura en Europa 1780/1880. Madrid: Cátedra. ISBN 84-376-0166-5.
- Palau-Ribes O'Callaghan, Mercedes; Laplana, Josep de C.; Fontbona, Francesc; Casacuberta, Margarida (2017). Santiago Rusiñol. Jardins d'Espanya. Barcelona: Museu del Modernisme de Barcelona.
- Pérez Carreño, Francisca (1993). Artemisia Gentileschi. Madrid: Historia 16.
- Pijoán, José; Gaya Nuño, Juan Antonio (1967). Summa Artis XXIII. Arte europeo de los siglos XIX y XX. Madrid: Editorial Espasa-Calpe.
- Poletti, Federico (2006). El siglo XX. Vanguardias. Milan: Electa. ISBN 978-84-8156-404-4.
- Pomilio, Mario; Ottino Della Chiesa, Angela (1988). La obra pictórica completa de Leonardo. Barcelona: Planeta. ISBN 84-320-2846-0.
- Prisco, Michele; De Vecchi, Pierluigi (1968). La obra pictórica completa de Rafael. Barcelona: Noguer.
- Prado, Juan Manuel (1989). Leonardo Da Vinci. Barcelona: Orbis-Fabbri. ISBN 84-402-0793-X.
- Prado, Juan Manuel (1989). Van Gogh. Barcelona: Orbis-Fabbri. ISBN 84-402-0790-5.
- Revilla, Federico (2016). Diccionario de iconografía y simbología. Madrid: Cátedra. ISBN 978-84-376-3016-8.
- Reyero, Carlos (2002). La luz artificial en la pintura moderna. Oviedo: Nobel. ISBN 84-8459-106-9.
- Ribot Martín, Domènec (2014). Goya. Madrid: Susaeta. ISBN 978-84-677-4076-9.
- Rideal, Liz (2017). Cómo leer pinturas. Barcelona: Blume. ISBN 978-84-96669-89-5.
- Röthlisberger, Marcel; Cecchi, Doretta (1982). La obra pictórica completa de Claudio de Lorena. Barcelona: Noguer. ISBN 84-279-8770-6.
- Rubiés, Pere (2001). Millet. Barcelona: Altaya. ISBN 84-487-0582-3.
- Salas, Xavier de; Frati, Tiziana (1970). La obra pictórica completa de El Greco. Barcelona: Noguer.
- Sanmiguel, David (2000). El desnudo. Barcelona: Parramón. ISBN 84-342-2060-1.
- Santa-Ana, Florencio de; Martínez, María José (1992). Sorolla. Valencia: Rayuela. ISBN 84-7915-081-5.
- Santos Torroella, Rafael; Casado, María José (1992). Dalí. Valencia: Rayuela. ISBN 84-7915-088-2.
- Schneider, Norbert (2016). Vermeer. Köln: Taschen. ISBN 978-3-8365-0468-3.
- Schneider Adams, Laurie (2004). Explorar el arte. Barcelona: Blume. ISBN 84-95939-51-7.
- Souriau, Étienne (1998). Diccionario Akal de Estética. Madrid: Akal. ISBN 84-460-0832-7.
- Sturgis, Alexander; Clayson, Hollis (2002). Entender la pintura. Barcelona: Blume. ISBN 84-8076-410-4.
- Sureda, Joan (2001). Summa Pictorica VI. La fastuosidad de lo Barroco. Barcelona: Planeta. ISBN 84-08-36134-1.
- Tarabra, Daniela (2009). Los estilos del arte. Milan: Electa.
- Tatarkiewicz, Władysław (1989). Historia de la estética II. La estética medieval. Madrid: Akal. ISBN 84-7600-407-9.
- Tatarkiewicz, Władysław (1991). Historia de la estética III. La estética moderna 1400-1700. Madrid: Akal. ISBN 84-7600-669-1.
- Tazartes, Maurizia (1999). Rousseau. Barcelona: Planeta DeAgostini. ISBN 84-395-7437-1.
- Thuillier, Jacques (1974). La obra pictórica completa de Georges de La Tour. Barcelona: Noguer. ISBN 84-279-8743-9.
- Toman, Rolf (2008). El arte en la Italia del Renacimiento. Köln: Tandem Verlag GmbH. ISBN 978-3-8331-5102-6.
- Triadó, Juan Ramón; Subirana, Rosa (1994). La claves de la pintura. Barcelona: Planeta. ISBN 84-08-01198-7.
- Turner, Jane (1996). The Dictionary of Art. 19 Leather to Macho. Grove. ISBN 1-884446-00-0.
- Ungaretti, Giuseppe; Bianconi, Piero (1973). La obra pictórica completa de Vermeer. Barcelona: Noguer. ISBN 84-279-8707-2.
- Valle Garagorri, Agustín (1989). Luz y sombra. A propósito de la fortuna de un tópico clasicista. (El estudio del pintor entre los siglos XV al XVIII). Madrid: Universidad Complutense.
- Venturi, Lionello (2016). Historia de la crítica de arte. Barcelona: DEBOLS!LLO. ISBN 978-84-663-3412-9.
- Wallace, William E. (2012). Miguel Ángel. Barcelona/Madrid: Lunwerg. ISBN 978-84-9785-870-0.
- Walther, Ingo F. (2012). El impresionismo. Köln: Benedikt Taschen Verlag. ISBN 978-3-8228-5052-7.
- Walther, Ingo F.; Metzger, Rainer (2006). Van Gogh. La obra completa: pintura. Köln: Benedikt Taschen Verlag. ISBN 978-3-8228-5066-4.
- Wolf, Norbert (2012). Caspar David Friedrich. Köln: Taschen. ISBN 978-3-8365-3968-5.
- Yot, Richard (2011). Guía para usar la luz para ilustradores, dibujantes pintores, interioristas y artistas. Barcelona: Blume. ISBN 978-84-9801-529-4.
- Zelanski, Paul; Fisher, Mary Pat (2001). Color. Barcelona: Blume. ISBN 84-89840-21-0.
- Zuffi, Stefano (2006). El siglo XVI. Milan: Electa. ISBN 978-84-8156-402-0.
