= History of philosophy (disambiguation) =

The history of philosophy is the study of philosophical ideas and concepts through time.

History of Philosophy may also refer to:

- A History of Philosophy (Copleston), book written by English Jesuit priest Frederick Charles Copleston
- History of Philosophy Quarterly, American peer-reviewed academic journal
- Journal of the History of Philosophy, academic journal published by Johns Hopkins University Press
- A History of Western Philosophy, a book by Bertrand Russell
- Sketch of the History of Philosophy, a book by Friedrich Ueberweg
