= The Unity of Philosophical Experience =

Critique of Western philosophy

- Author: Étienne Gilson
- Language: English
- Subject: history of philosophy
- Publisher: C. Scribner's Sons
- Publication date: 1937
- Pages: 331
- ISBN: 978-0898707489

The Unity of Philosophical Experience is a 1937 book by Étienne Gilson in which the author provides a critique of Western philosophy, focused in turn on medieval philosophy, Cartesianism, and modern Kantianism and Comtean positivism.

== Reception ==
Philosopher and theologian Benedict M. Ashley compared Copleston's A History of Philosophy to some of the most famous histories of philosophy including Gilson's as follows: "Some histories of philosophy, like the admirable one of Frederick Copleston, only attempt to give an accurate account of various philosophies in their general historical setting. Others, like Bertrand Russell in his absurd History of Western Philosophy or Etienne Gilson in his brilliant The Unity of Philosophical Experience proffer an argument for a particular philosophical position."
