= The Dream of Reason =

2000 history of philosophy by Anthony Gottlieb

The Dream of Reason: A History of Philosophy from the Greeks to the Renaissance
- Author: Anthony Gottlieb
- Language: English
- Genre: Non-fiction
- Publisher: W. W. Norton & Company
- Publication date: 2000
- Pages: 468
- ISBN: 9780393049510 0393049515, 9780393323658
- OCLC: 1005497610
- Followed by: The Dream of Enlightenment

The Dream of Reason: A History of Philosophy from the Greeks to the Renaissance is a 2000 nonfiction book by Anthony Gottlieb, the first in a series of three volumes that introduce Western philosophy to a wide audience. The second volume is The Dream of Enlightenment. The third volume in the trilogy—which will continue chronologically from Immanuel Kant—will complete the survey, that has been compared to Bertrand Russell's A History of Western Philosophy published in 1945.

== Content ==
In his 2000 publication, The Dream of Reason: A History of Philosophy from the Greeks to the Renaissance, Gottlieb described the first of two explosions of thought that contributed to western philosophical traditions—such as the Athenian philosophers Socrates, Plato, and Aristotle.

He includes separate sections on the Milesians, the Pythagoreans, Heraclitus, Parmenides, Zeno of Elea, Empedocles, Anaxagoras, Democritus, the Sophists, Socrates and the Socratics, Plato, Aristotle, Epicureans, Stoics, and Sceptics and concludes with "The haven of piety" from late antiquity to the Renaissance.

== The trilogy ==
My aim...was to approach the story of philosophy as a journalist ought to: to rely only on primary sources, wherever they still existed; to question everything that had become conventional wisdom; and, above all, to try and explain it all as clearly as I could."

— Gottlieb, 2000:vii

In the book's introduction, Gottlieb cited William James, who described philosophy as "a particularly stubborn effort to think clearly."

He said that his goal was to show two "sides of the story of this dream of reason" from the sixth century BC to the Renaissance. On the one hand, there were failures in attempting to push the boundaries of rational inquiry to its limits resulting, in a mere "mirage". On the other, there have been magnificent successes where the "dream is revealed as a fruitful inspiration.

== Reviews ==
The 2000 review in The Guardian said that Gottlieb handled "opaque and controversial issues" with skill, as would be expected of the author who was a senior editor at The Economist for many years.

The New York Times review by Michael Wood said that Gottlieb had succeeded in achieving his aim in writing the series, which was to present philosophers—both old and new—to readers without turning the philosophers into "mouthpieces for what we already think we know."

The Dream of Reason was "both popular and critically well received" according to the Australian Book Review.

Kirkus Reviews said it was a "[s]uperbly literate, wide-ranging survey" that "rescues philosophy from the dusty textbooks". It is "[a]necdotal", at times "breezy", "resolutely and refreshingly nonacademic" according to the review.

Publishers Weekly compared Gottlieb's "elegant", "eloquent" and "lively" volume to F.C. Copleston's "prodigious, learned" A History of Philosophy and Bertrand Russell's "idiosyncratic tracts of scholarly obfuscation", A History of Western Philosophy. The reviewer said it "brings a breath of fresh air" to surveys of Western philosophy.

Library Journal said that Gottlieb's book was "unambiguous". Gottlieb's fresh approach resulted from the fact that he was not a professionally trained philosopher. Gottlieb saw "the history of philosophy" as a "history of a sharply inquisitive cast of mind" more than the "history of a sharply defined discipline".

== See also ==
- A History of Philosophy by Frederick Copleston
- A History of Western Philosophy by Bertrand Russell
- A New History of Western Philosophy by Anthony Kenny
- The Dream of Enlightenment (2016) by Anthony Gottlieb
