= The Dream of Enlightenment =

2016 history of philosophy by Anthony Gottlieb

The Dream of Enlightenment: The Rise of Modern Philosophy
- Author: Anthony Gottlieb
- Language: English
- Genre: Non-fiction
- Publisher: Liveright Publishing Corporation, a division of W. W. Norton & Company
- Publication date: 2016
- Pages: 301
- ISBN: 9780871404435
- OCLC: 960408103
- Preceded by: The Dream of Reason (2001)

The Dream of Enlightenment: The Rise of Modern Philosophy is a 2016 nonfiction book by Anthony Gottlieb, a former editor of The Economist. It is a sequel to his 2001 nonfiction, The Dream of Reason: A History of Philosophy from the Greeks to the Renaissance.

== Content ==
The book is the second volume in a series of three written as an introduction to Western philosophy for a broad audience. In his 2000 publication, The Dream of Reason: A History of Philosophy from the Greeks to the Renaissance, Gottlieb described the first of two explosions of thought that contributed to western philosophical traditions—starting with the Athenian philosophers, Socrates, Plato, and Aristotle. (Note: An early 300 page paperback edition of Dream of enlightenment was first published in 2014 by Penguin Books.) In The Dream of Enlightenment, Gottlieb describes the second "burst" starting with René Descartes, then Thomas Hobbes, Baruch Spinoza, John Locke, Gottfried Leibniz, David Hume, Voltaire, Jean-Jacques Rousseau, and the philosophes. Gottlieb describes how these two "staccato bursts"—each one only lasting for 150 years—contained the essence of two and a half millennia of Western philosophy. The first volume in the trilogy is The Dream of Reason which begins with the Greek philosophers and ends with the Renaissance, was published in 2000. In The Dream of the Enlightenment, Gottlieb "picks up the story" from the time of Descartes in the 17th century and continues through to the French Revolution. in which he "skillfully juggle[d]" aspects of the biographies of European philosophers against the backdrop of intellectual, political, and scientific transformations.

== Reviews ==
It is because they still have something to say to us that we can easily get these philosophers wrong.

— Gottlieb cited by Rée, 2016

The Guardian's reviewer described this book as the "much-anticipated sequel" to the 2000 The Dream of Reason that is both "well-written and fast-moving".

== See also ==
- A History of Philosophy by Frederick Copleston
- A History of Western Philosophy by Bertrand Russell
- A New History of Western Philosophy by Anthony Kenny
- The Dream of Reason (2000) by Anthony Gottlieb
