= A History of Western Philosophy =

1946 book by Bertrand Russell

History of Western Philosophy
- Dustjacket of the first UK edition
- Author: Bertrand Russell
- Language: English
- Subject: Western philosophy
- Publisher: Simon & Schuster (US); George Allen & Unwin Ltd (UK)
- Publication date: 1945 (US); 1946 (UK)
- Media type: Print
- ISBN: 0-415-32505-6

History of Western Philosophy (Note: Full title A History of Western Philosophy and Its Connection with Political and Social Circumstances from the Earliest Times to the Present Day – the indefinite article was deleted in the British editions.) is a 1945 book by British philosopher Bertrand Russell (1872–1970). A survey of Western philosophy from the pre-Socratic philosophers to the early 20th century, each major division of the book is prefaced by an account of the historical background necessary to understand the currents of thought it describes. When Russell was awarded the Nobel Prize in Literature in 1950, A History of Western Philosophy was cited as one of the books that won him the award. Its success provided Russell with financial security for the last part of his life. The book was criticised, however, for overgeneralizations and omissions, particularly from the post-Cartesian period, but nevertheless became a popular and commercial success, and has remained in print from its first publication.

== Background ==
The book was written during the Second World War, having its origins in a series of lectures on the history of philosophy that Russell gave at the Barnes Foundation in Philadelphia during 1941 and 1942. Much of the historical research was done by Russell's third wife Patricia. In 1943, Russell received an advance of $3000 from the publishers, and between 1940 and 1943 he wrote the book while living mainly in Pennsylvania. The book was published in 1945 in the US and a year later in the United Kingdom. It was reset as a 'new edition' in 1961, but no new material was added. Corrections and minor revisions were made to printings of the British first edition and for 1961's new edition; no corrections seem to have been transferred to the American edition (even Spinoza's birth year remains wrong).

== Summary ==
The work is divided into three books, each of which is subdivided into chapters; each chapter generally deals with a single philosopher, school of philosophy, or period of time.

=== Ancient Philosophy ===
- The Pre-Socratics (including Thales, Pythagoras, Heraclitus, Parmenides, Empedocles, Anaximander, Anaximenes, Anaxagoras, Leucippus, Democritus and Protagoras)
- Socrates, Plato and Aristotle
- Ancient Philosophy after Aristotle (including the Cynics, Sceptics, Epicureans, Stoics and Plotinus)

=== Catholic Philosophy ===
- The Fathers (including developments in Jewish philosophy, Islamic philosophy (which he calls Mohammedan throughout, after the fashion of his time), St Ambrose, St Jerome, St Augustine, St Benedict and Pope Gregory the Great)
- The Schoolmen (including John the Scot and St Thomas Aquinas)

=== Modern Philosophy ===
- From the Renaissance to Hume (including Machiavelli, Erasmus, More, Bacon, Hobbes, Descartes, Spinoza, Leibniz, Locke, Berkeley and Hume)
- From Rousseau to the Present Day (including Rousseau, Kant, Hegel, Byron, Schopenhauer, Nietzsche, the Utilitarians, Marx, Bergson, William James and John Dewey (Note: Dewey was the only then living philosopher to have a chapter devoted to him in Russell's book.))
- The last chapter in this section, The Philosophy of Logical Analysis, is concerned with Russell's own philosophical views at the time.

== Reception ==
=== Contemporary reviews ===
According to British philosopher A.C. Grayling, "Almost all those who reviewed Russell's now famous History of Western Philosophy when it first appeared in 1945 were agreed about two things: first, that it is beautifully written, witty, clear, lucid and magisterial; and second, that it is not always accurate in its account of the thinkers it covers, nor always fair to them." Russell was somewhat dismayed at the mixed reception, especially from academic reviewers. He himself described the text as a work of social history, asking that it be treated in such a manner. Russell also stated: "I regarded the early part of my History of Western Philosophy as a history of culture, but in the later parts, where science becomes important, it is more difficult to fit into this framework. I did my best, but I am not at all sure that I succeeded. I was sometimes accused by reviewers of writing not a true history but a biased account of the events that I arbitrarily chose to write of. But to my mind, a man without bias cannot write interesting history – if, indeed, such a man exists."

In 1947 in the Journal of the History of Ideas, the philosopher George Boas wrote that, "A History of Western Philosophy errs consistently in this respect. Its author never seems to be able to make up his mind whether he is writing history or polemic.... [Its method] confers on philosophers who are dead and gone a kind of false contemporaneity which may make them seem important to the uninitiate. But nevertheless it is a misreading of history." In 1948 in Isis, Leo Roberts wrote that while Russell was a deft and witty writer, A History of Western Philosophy was perhaps the worst of Russell's books. In his view, Russell was at his best when dealing with contemporary philosophy, and that in contrast "his treatment of ancient and medieval doctrines is nearly worthless." Notwithstanding this, A History of Western Philosophy was praised by physicists Albert Einstein and Erwin Schrödinger.

The philosopher Frederick Copleston, writing in A History of Philosophy (1946–75), described Russell's book as "unusually lively and entertaining", but added that Russell's "treatment of a number of important philosophers is both inadequate and misleading." He credited Russell with drawing attention to the logical side of Leibniz's philosophy, but questioned Russell's view that there is a sharp distinction between Leibniz's "popular philosophy" and his "esoteric doctrine".

=== Later assessments ===
The critic George Steiner, writing in Heidegger (1991), described A History of Western Philosophy as "vulgar", noting that Russell omits any mention of Martin Heidegger. In Jon Stewart's anthology The Hegel Myths and Legends (1996), Russell's work is listed as a book that has propagated "myths" about Hegel. Stephen Houlgate writes that Russell's claim that Hegel's doctrine of the state justifies any form of tyranny is ignorant. The philosopher Roger Scruton, writing in A Short History of Modern Philosophy (2001), described A History of Western Philosophy as elegantly written and witty, but faulted it for Russell's concentration on pre-Cartesian philosophy, lack of understanding of Immanuel Kant, and overgeneralization and omissions.

The British philosopher A.C. Grayling wrote in 2002 that "Parts of this famous book are sketchy ... in other respects it is a marvelously readable, magnificently sweeping survey of Western thought, distinctive for placing it informatively into its historical context. Russell enjoyed writing it, and the enjoyment shows; his later remarks about it equally show that he was conscious of its shortcomings." In 2004, Grayling elaborated on his assessment of Russell's work:

Because of the partisan nature of its views, and the quick, witty style of their presentation, it has never been a staple as an academic textbook. Instead it has belonged to the amateurs of philosophy, in the sense of both those who love the pursuit and those who read it in their own time for their own instruction. Written late in life by one of the great contributors to philosophy and logic, who was also a man of deep and abiding liberal principles, it is a unique book. Highly readable, very amusing, full of instruction, even when it needs the correctives of closer scholarship, it is one of the monuments of twentieth-century philosophy and literature....

== See also ==
- A History of Philosophy by Frederick Copleston
- Lectures on the History of Philosophy by Georg Wilhelm Friedrich Hegel
- A New History of Western Philosophy by Anthony Kenny
- The Dream of Reason (2000) and The Dream of Enlightenment (2016) by Anthony Gottlieb
