= Anthony Gottlieb =

British writer and historian

Anthony John Gottlieb (born 1956) is a British writer, author, historian of ideas, and former Executive Editor of The Economist. He is the author of two major works on the history of philosophy, The Dream of Reason and The Dream of Enlightenment.

A Two-Year Fellow of All Souls College, Oxford from October 2017, Gottlieb has previously held visiting fellowships at All Souls and Harvard University, and has been a visiting scholar at New York University and fellow at the Cullman Center for Scholars and Writers at the New York Public Library. He has also taught at the CUNY Graduate Center and the New School in New York. He is a fellow of the New York Institute for the Humanities and was the series editor of The Routledge Guides to the Great Books.

Gottlieb was educated at Gonville and Caius College, Cambridge, and University College London. He was formerly married to the British author Miranda Seymour.

== The Economist ==
Gottlieb was a member of the editorial staff of The Economist from 1984 to 2006, and its Executive Editor and editor of "Economist.com" from 1997 to 2006. His earlier posts at the magazine included Britain Correspondent, Science and Technology Editor, and Surveys Editor. He describes his having taken up journalism as being "[b]y accident" and that he "was looking for distractions from academic philosophy."

== Works ==
Gottlieb's published books include The Dream of Reason: A History of Philosophy from the Greeks to the Renaissance, The Dream of Enlightenment: The Rise of Modern Philosophy and Ludwig Wittgenstein: Philosophy in the Age of Airplanes. He has published many articles and book reviews in The New York Times since 1990 on subjects ranging from philosophy and history to the role of talking parrots in literature and the significance of sex with robots, and in The New Yorker on the Wittgenstein family, René Descartes, works on atheism, the theory of voting, and evolutionary psychology. His work also appears in Intelligent Life and The Wall Street Journal. He is currently working on a third volume in his history of western philosophy that will cover Kant and the schools that followed him up to the present day.
