= A New History of Western Philosophy =

Book by Anthony Kenny

- Author: Anthony Kenny
- Language: English
- Subject: Western philosophy
- Publisher: Oxford University Press
- Publication date: 2010
- Media type: Print
- ISBN: 978-0-19-958988-3

A New History of Western Philosophy is a 2010 book by the British philosopher and theologian Anthony Kenny, consisting of a history of Western philosophy from the ancient Greeks to the present day. The book consists of four separate parts which were originally released separately during the period 2004–07. The book is dedicated to the memory of Georg Henrik von Wright.

Critics claim Kenny's account of philosophy, while generally good, is quite limited in the Islamic world, focusing only on those works that became important in the Latin tradition.

== Summary ==
The book is split into four parts, plus a general introduction and index/bibliography. Each part begins with an historical chapter outlining the major philosophers and schools of thought of the period in question, followed by several thematic chapters dealing with a particular branch of philosophy e.g. logic, theology, ethics etc.

=== Part 1: Ancient Philosophy ===
Originally published in 2004, this part covers the period from the earliest Greek philosophers to the conversion of St Augustine in 387 AD, including:

- The Pre-Socratics
- Socrates, Plato and Aristotle
- Graeco-Roman and Roman philosophers (Cicero, Seneca, Plotinus, Marcus Aurelius, Augustine etc.)
- Graeco-Roman schools of thought (Cynics, Epicureans, Stoics etc.)
- Neo-Platonism

=== Part 2: Medieval Philosophy ===
Originally published in 2005, this part covers the post-Augustinian period up to the Lateran Council on 1512, including:

- Augustine, Thomas Aquinas, William Ockham, Duns Scotus
- Jewish and Islamic philosophy
- Medieval theology
- Scholasticism

=== Part 3: The Rise of Modern Philosophy ===
Originally published in 2006, this part covers the period of the 16th century - mid-19th century, including:

- The rise of science
- Empiricism
- Descartes, Spinoza, Leibniz, Locke, Hobbes, David Hume, Kant, Hegel

=== Part 4: Philosophy in the Modern World ===
Originally published in 2007, this part covers the post-Hegelian period up to the present day, including:

- Materialism
- Utilitarianism
- Pragmatism
- Marxism
- Nietzsche, Schopenhauer, Kierkegaard, Wittgenstein, Heidegger, Derrida, Sartre

== Publication ==
- Kenny, Anthony (2004). Ancient philosophy. Oxford: Clarendon Press. ISBN 978-0-19-152497-4. OCLC 171039729.

== See also ==
- Lectures on the History of Philosophy by Georg Wilhelm Friedrich Hegel
- A History of Western Philosophy by Bertrand Russell
- A History of Philosophy by Frederick Copleston
