= A History of Philosophy (Copleston) =

Book by Frederick Copleston

- Cover of volume I
- Author: Frederick Copleston
- Language: English
- Subject: Western philosophy
- Publisher: Continuum (worldwide), Doubleday (US & Canada), Paulist Press (US & Canada)
- Publication date: 1946–1975 (volumes 1–9), 1956 (volume 11), 1986 (volume 10)
- Publication place: United Kingdom
- Media type: Print
- Pages: 5,344 (volumes 1–11) (2003 Continuum editions)

A History of Philosophy is a history of Western philosophy written by the English Jesuit priest Frederick Charles Copleston originally published in nine volumes between 1946 and 1975. As is noted by The Encyclopedia Britannica, the work became a "standard introductory philosophy text for thousands of university students, particularly in its U.S. paperback edition." Since 2003 it has been marketed as an eleven volume work with two other works, previously published by Copleston, being added to the series.

== Overview ==
The work provides extensive coverage of Western philosophy from the pre-Socratics through to John Dewey, Bertrand Russell, George Edward Moore, Jean-Paul Sartre and Maurice Merleau-Ponty.

Originally conceived as a three volume work covering ancient, medieval and modern philosophy, and written to serve as a textbook for use in Catholic ecclesiastical seminaries, the work grew into nine volumes published between 1946 and 1975 and to become a standard work of reference for philosophers and philosophy students that was noted for its objectivity.

A tenth and eleventh volume were added to the series in 2003 (after Copleston's death in 1994) by Continuum (which later became an imprint of Bloomsbury). The tenth volume Russian Philosophy had previously appeared as Philosophy in Russia in 1986. The eleventh volume Logical Positivism and Existentialism had previously appeared as the revised 1972 edition of Contemporary Philosophy (an essay collection first published in 1956).

The series has been translated into Italian, French, Spanish, Serbian, Turkish, Japanese, Chinese, Romanian, Portuguese, Polish and Persian.

== Volume summaries ==
The following is a summary of details (not a full table of contents) for the eleven volumes:

=== Volume 1: Greece and Rome ===
Originally published in 1946, this volume covers:

- Pre-Socratic philosophy
- The Socratic period
- Plato
- Aristotle
- Post-Aristotelian philosophy

As with others in the series, this volume would be made available by Image Books (Doubleday) in two parts, the first ending with Plato, the second beginning with Aristotle. Gerard J. Hughes reports that in later years Copleston thought the first volume "deplorable" and wished that he had had the time to rewrite it.

=== Volume 2: Augustine to Scotus ===
Originally published in 1950, this volume, which has also borne the subtitle Medieval Philosophy, covers:

- Pre-mediaeval Influences (including St. Augustine)
- The Carolingian Renaissance
- The Tenth, Eleventh, and Twelfth Centuries
- Islamic and Jewish Philosophy
- The Thirteenth Century (including St. Bonaventure, St. Thomas Aquinas and Duns Scotus)

Copleston also produced a work on Medieval Philosophy (1952) which, revised and expanded, became A History of Medieval Philosophy (1972). This work covered some of the same subjects as the second and third volumes of his History. Copleston would also write Aquinas (1955) expanding on his treatment of the thinker in volume 2.

=== Volume 3: Ockham to Suarez ===
Originally published in 1953, this volume which has also borne the subtitle Late Medieval and Renaissance Philosophy, covers:

- The Fourteenth Century (including William of Ockham)
- Philosophy of the Renaissance (including Francis Bacon)
- Scholasticism of the Renaissance (including Francisco Suárez)

Copleston also produced a work on Medieval Philosophy (1952) which, revised and expanded, became A History of Medieval Philosophy (1972). This work covered some of the same subjects as the second and third volumes of his History.

=== Volume 4: Descartes to Leibniz ===
Originally published in 1958, this volume, which has also borne the subtitle The Rationalists, covers:

- René Descartes
- Blaise Pascal
- Nicolas Malebranche
- Baruch Spinoza
- Gottfried Leibniz

=== Volume 5: Hobbes to Hume ===
Originally published in 1959, this volume, which has also borne the subtitle British Philosophy, covers:

- Thomas Hobbes
- John Locke
- Isaac Newton
- George Berkeley
- David Hume

=== Volume 6: Wolff to Kant ===
Originally published in 1960, this volume, which has also borne the subtitle The Enlightenment, covers:

- The French Enlightenment (including Jean-Jacques Rousseau)
- The German Enlightenment
- The Rise of the Philosophy of History (including Giambattista Vico and Voltaire)
- Christian Wolff
- Immanuel Kant

=== Volume 7: Fichte to Nietzsche ===
Originally published in 1963, this volume, which has also borne the subtitle 18th and 19th Century German Philosophy, covers:

- Johann Gottlieb Fichte
- Friedrich Wilhelm Joseph Schelling
- Friedrich Schleiermacher
- Georg Wilhelm Friedrich Hegel
- Arthur Schopenhauer
- The Transformation of Idealism (including Ludwig Feuerbach and Max Stirner)
- Karl Marx and Friedrich Engels
- Søren Kierkegaard
- Neo-Kantianism
- Friedrich Nietzsche

Copleston also wrote separate works on two of the philosophers treated in this volume: Friedrich Nietzsche: Philosopher of Culture (1942), a work expanded in 1975, and Arthur Schopenhauer: Philosopher of Pessimism (1946). He was also interviewed by Bryan Magee on Schopenhauer for BBC Television in 1987.

=== Volume 8: Bentham to Russell ===
Originally published in 1966, this volume, which has also borne the subtitle Utilitarianism to Early Analytic Philosophy, covers:

- British Empiricism (including John Stuart Mill and Herbert Spencer)
- The Idealist Movement in Great Britain (including Francis Herbert Bradley and Bernard Bosanquet)
- Idealism in America (including Josiah Royce)
- The Pragmatist Movement (including Charles Sanders Peirce, William James, and John Dewey)
- The Revolt Against Idealism (including George Edward Moore and Bertrand Russell)

=== Volume 9: Maine de Biran to Sartre ===
Originally published in 1975, this volume which has also borne the subtitle 19th and 20th Century French Philosophy covers:

- From the French Revolution to Auguste Comte (including Maine de Biran)
- From Auguste Comte to Henri Bergson
- From Henri Bergson to Jean-Paul Sartre (including Maurice Merleau-Ponty)

=== Volume 10: Russian Philosophy ===
Though (according to Gerard J. Hughes) a tenth volume of History on Russian philosophy had once been projected, Copleston's work in this area resulted in two books not part of that series: Philosophy in Russia (1986) and Russian Religious Philosophy (1988). The former book (which the original publishers had claimed could "reasonably be regarded as a companion volume to the series”) was added as Volume 10 by Continuum in 2003 (though it also continued to be sold under its original title to libraries as of 2019).

- Ivan Kireevsky, Peter Lavrov, and other Russian philosophers
- Philosophy in Dostoevsky and Tolstoy
- Religion and Philosophy: Vladimir Solovyov
- Plekhanov, Bogdanov, Lenin and Marxism
- Nikolai Berdyaev and other philosophers in exile

=== Volume 11: Logical Positivism and Existentialism ===
Included, from 2003, as Volume 11 in the Continuum edition, Logical Positivism and Existentialism is a collection of essays which (barring a first chapter rewritten for a 1972 republishing) had all been published in Copleston's Contemporary Philosophy (1956). It covers Logical positivism and Existentialism.

== Reception and legacy ==
Reviewing the first volume in 1947, George Boas remarked that: "None of [Copleston's Thomistic] interpretations will do much harm to the reader of this very scholarly book. Most of them are put in parentheses, as if they were inserted to warn the seminarists that they must not be taken in by the pagans. They could be removed, and a history of ancient philosophy ad usum infidelium would result which would be head and shoulders above the usual histories. [...] He obviously knows the ancient literature well and, if he had not felt himself obliged to be a modern Eusebius, he had the knowledge to write a genuine history. On the other hand, he is too given to periodizing and generalizing. [...] One can have but the highest praise for Father Copleston's erudition; it is too bad that he could not have put it into writing a really original study of ancient philosophical ideas."

Regarding the objectivity of the work, Martin Gardner, echoing remarks he had made previously, noted: "The Jesuit priest Frederick Copleston wrote a marvelous multi-volume history of philosophy. I have no inkling of what he believed about any Catholic doctrine."

Reviewing 1986's Philosophy in Russia (sold, from 2003, as the tenth volume of the Continuum edition) Geoffrey A. Hosking noted that the author was "as fair to the atheist and socialist thinkers as he is to the religious ones, with whom, as a member of the Society of Jesus, he is presumably more in sympathy." And said that overall it was "a magisterially competent survey." But, he concluded: "I confess, though, to being slightly disappointed that Copleston's enormous experience did not generate a few more original insights, and in particular did not provoke him into examining the most important of all the practical questions that Russian philosophy poses."

Writing in 2017, philosopher Christia Mercer credited the work as "a hugely ambitious and admirably clear study" but remarked that, although the author includes "mystics like Master Eckhart (1260-1328) and prominent Jesuit scholastics like Francisco Suárez (1548–1617), he entirely ignores the richly philosophical spiritual writings of even the most prominent late medieval women, reducing the entirety of philosophy to a series of great men, each responding to the ones who went before".

Philosopher and theologian Benedict M. Ashley compared A History of Philosophy to some of the most famous histories of philosophy as follows: "Some histories of philosophy, like the admirable one of Frederick Copleston, only attempt to give an accurate account of various philosophies in their general historical setting. Others, like Bertrand Russell in his absurd History of Western Philosophy or Etienne Gilson in his brilliant The Unity of Philosophical Experience proffer an argument for a particular philosophical position."

In 1993,The Washington Post wrote: "Copleston's account of western philosophy has long been a standard reference, most familiar to students as a series of slender rack-sized paperbacks. Copleston writes with welcome clarity, but without the slight dumbing down of Will Durant's engaging Story of Philosophy or the biases of Bertrand Russell's provocative History of Western Philosophy. In other words, Copleston's volumes are still the place to start for anyone interested in following man's speculations about himself and his world."

Gerard J. Hughes in The New Catholic Encyclopedia, described the work as "a model of clarity, objectivity, and scholarly accuracy, unsurpassed in its accessibility and balance."

The Cambridge Encyclopedia of the Jesuits: "[A] monumental nine-volume [history][...] published between 1946 and 1974, for which [Copleston] would receive wide-spread acclaim. Described by The Times of London as 'the best all-round history of philosophical thinking from the pre-Socratics to Sartre' (April 2, 1994), Copleston's history became renowned for the erudition of its scholarship, the comprehensive scope of its content, and the relatively objective position from which it was written."

The Review of Metaphysics: "(The) best known historian of philosophy in the English speaking world, and a man to whom many are indebted."

Jon Cameron (University of Aberdeen): "To this day Copleston's history remains a monumental achievement and stays true to the authors it discusses being very much a work in exposition."

As of September 1979, The Washington Post reported that: "[Image/Doubleday's] best-selling multi-volume work, Frederick Copleston's "[A] History of Philosophy" (nine parts, 17 volumes) has collectively sold 1.6 million copies."

== Editions ==
- Copleston, Frederick (2003). A History of Philosophy Vols 1-11. Great Britain: Continuum. ISBN 978-0826469489.
- Copleston, Frederick (1962–1975). A History of Philosophy. New York, USA: Image Books (Doubleday).
- Copleston, Frederick (2000–2004). Historia de la filosofía. Barcelona: Editorial Ariel. ISBN 978-84-344-8700-0.

== See also ==
- A History of Western Philosophy by Bertrand Russell
- Lectures on the History of Philosophy by Georg Wilhelm Friedrich Hegel
- A New History of Western Philosophy by Anthony Kenny
