= Lectures on the History of Philosophy =

Work by G. W. F. Hegel

The Lectures on the History of Philosophy (German: Vorlesungen über die Geschichte der Philosophie) were delivered by Georg Wilhelm Friedrich Hegel in 1805–6, 1816–1818, 1819, 1820, 1825–26, 1827–28, 1829–30, and 1831, just before he died in November of that year.

== Overview ==
Hegel's lecture notes were edited by his student, Karl Ludwig Michelet in 1833, and revised in 1840–1842. An English translation was provided by Elizabeth Haldane in 1892.

In it, he outlined his ideas on the major philosophers. He saw consciousness as progressing from an undifferentiated pantheism of the East to a more individualistic understanding culminating in the freedom of the Germanic era.

In his lectures Hegel cites extensively the voluminous histories of philosophy written in Germany after 1740; among them: Johann Jakob Brucker's Historia critica philosophiae, 6 vols. (1742–1767; "Critical History of Philosophy"); Johann Buhle's Lehrbuch der Geschichte der Philosophie, 8 vols. (1796–1804; "Textbook on the History of Philosophy"); Dietrich Tiedemann's Geist der spekulativen Philosophie von Thales bis Berkeley, 6 vols. (1791–1797; "The Spirit of Speculative Philosophy from Thales to Berkeley"); and Wilhelm Gottlieb Tennemann's Geschichte der Philosophie, 11 vols. (1789–1819; "History of Philosophy").

== Bibliography ==
- Hegel, Georg Wilhelm Friedrich (1996) [1892 Kegan Paul]. Haldane, Elizabeth Sanderson (ed.). Vorlesungen über die Geschichte der Philosophie [Hegel's Lectures on the History of Philosophy, 3 vols.]. Humanities Press International. ISBN 978-0-391-03957-5. (full text at Internet Archive Vol. 1) Vol. 2 Vol. 3
- Walsh, W. H. (1965). "Hegel on the History of Philosophy". History and Theory. 5: 67. doi:10.2307/2504119. JSTOR 2504119.
