= List of S. Thomas' College alumni =

This is a list of alumni of S. Thomas' College, Mt. Lavinia Sri Lanka. It also includes alumni from its affiliated schools S. Thomas' College, Bandarawela, S. Thomas' College, Guruthalawa, and S. Thomas' Preparatory School.

== Arts, academia, entertainment and media ==
Name	Notability	Campus	Reference
Rajpal Abeynayake	Editor-in-Chief of the Daily News and the Sunday Observer; founder and Chief Editor of Sunday Lakbima News	Mount Lavinia	
A. C. G. S. Amarasekara OBE	Painter	Mutwal	
K. D. Arulpragasam	Academic; vice-chancellor of Eastern University	Mount Lavinia	
Vijaya Corea	Broadcaster; former Director General of the Sri Lanka Broadcasting Corporation	Mount Lavinia	
R. S. de Saram OBE	Co-founder of S. Thomas' College, Gurutalawa	Mount Lavinia	
Arjuna P. de Silva	Gastroenterologist; Professor of Medicine at University of Kelaniya (2013–present)	Mount Lavinia	
Richard de Zoysa	Journalist, author, actor	Mount Lavinia	
Justin Pieris Deraniyagala	Painter	Mount Lavinia	
Siran Upendra Deraniyagala	Archaeologist	Mount Lavinia	
Mohan Edirisinghe OBE	Biomaterials engineer; professor at University College London	Mount Lavinia	
Devaka Fernando	Physician; Professor of Medicine at University of Sri Jayawardanapura	Mount Lavinia	
Gamini Fonseka	Film actor; MP (1989–1994); Governor of North Eastern Province (1995–1998)	Mount Lavinia	
R. D. Gunaratne	Former Director of National Science and Technology Commission		
Rajan Hoole	Mathematician, human rights activist	Mount Lavinia	
Stanley Kalpage	Chairman of University Grants Commission (1977–1989)	Mount Lavinia	
Harshan Lamabadusuriya	Professional Scrabble player; paediatrician	Mount Lavinia	
Paul R. Mather	Professor of Accounting and Finance at La Trobe University	Mount Lavinia	
Nimal Mendis	Singer/songwriter	Mount Lavinia	
Michael Ondaatje CC	Author; 1992 winner of the Booker Prize	Mount Lavinia	
Pradeep Rangana	Singer; 2007 winner of Sirasa Superstar	Bandarawela	
James T. Rutnam	Historian, writer and politician	Mount Lavinia	
Nihal Samarasinghe	Saxophonist and singer	Mount Lavinia	
Ediriweera Sarachchandra	Playwright, novelist and poet	Mount Lavinia	
Stanley Jeyaraja Tambiah	Anthropologist; Professor at Harvard University	Mount Lavinia	
Panini Tennekoon	Architect	Mount Lavinia	
Douglas Walatara	Professor of Education at University of Colombo		
Gamini Weerakoon	Journalist and newspaper editor	Mount Lavinia	
Lionel Wendt	Pianist, photographer and filmmaker	Mutwal	
Dayantha Wijeyesekera	Civil engineer; Vice Chancellor of Open University and University of Moratuwa; chairman, Tertiary and Vocational Education Commission in the Ministry of Youth Affairs and Skills Development	Mount Lavinia	
Lakdasa Wikkramasinha	Poet	Mount Lavinia	

== Business ==
Name	Notability	Campus	Reference
Ivan Corea	Founder of Autism Awareness Campaign UK and Autism Sunday	Preparatory and Mount Lavinia	
Sir Henry De Mel CBE	Industrialist, lawyer, philanthropist and member of the Legislative Council (1921–1936)		
Jacob De Mel	Industrialist and philanthropist	Mutwal	
Charles Henry de Soysa	Tea planter, entrepreneur and philanthropist	Mutwal	
Sir Christopher Ondaatje CBE, OC	Stockbroker, publisher and competitive bobsledder	Guruthalawa	
Raj Rajaratnam	Hedge fund manager and founder of Galleon Group	Mount Lavinia	
Janeeth Rodrigo	Founder of IdeaHell	Mount Lavinia	
Chandra Schaffter	Founder of Janashakthi Insurance and former cricket administrator	Mount Lavinia	
Kamaj Silva	Founder of Sneakertub	Mount Lavinia	
S. K. Wickremasinghe	Businessman and diplomat	Mount Lavinia	
Hans Wijayasuriya	CEO of Dialog Axiata	Mount Lavinia	
D. R. Wijewardena	Founder of Lake House Group and Associated Newspapers of Ceylon Ltd	Mutwal	

== Law and judiciary ==
Name	Notability	Campus	Reference
Nihal Sri Ameresekere	Litigator and expert on fraud and corruption	Mount Lavinia	
Sarath de Abrew	Puisne Justice of the Supreme Court of Sri Lanka	Mount Lavinia	
Frederick Dornhorst	Lawyer and King's Advocate	Mount Lavinia	
Janaprith Fernando	Lawyer and Chief Commissioner of Sri Lanka Scout Association	Preparatory and Mount Lavinia	
Mahen Gopallawa	Judge of the Court of Appeal of Sri Lanka (2024–present)	Mount Lavinia	
Noel Gratiaen CMG	Lawyer and judge	Mount Lavinia	
K. C. Kamalasabayson	Solicitor General and Attorney General of Sri Lanka		
Gihan Kulatunga	Puisne Justice of the Supreme Court of Sri Lanka (2025–present)	Mount Lavinia	
Arjuna Obeyesekere	Puisne Justice of the Supreme Court of Sri Lanka (2021–present)	Preparatory and Mount Lavinia	
Sir Stewart Schneider	Solicitor General (1917)	Mount Lavinia	
F. R. Senanayake	Lawyer, independence activist and Colombo Municipal Councilor (1912–1926)	Mutwal	
H. D. Thambiah	Chief Justice of Sri Lanka and Puisne Justice of the Supreme Court of Sri Lanka	Mount Lavinia	
Vincent Thamotheram	Puisne Justice of the Supreme Court of Sri Lanka and Commissioner of Assize	Mount Lavinia	
Arthur Wijewardena	Governor-General (1953-1953), Chief Justice (1949–1950) and Solicitor General (1936–1939) of Ceylon		
Arittha R Wikramanayake	Attorney specialising in corporate law	Mount Lavinia	
Elanga Wikramanayake	Solicitor General (1977)		

== Medicine and science ==
Name	Notability	Campus	Reference
S. Arumugam	Engineer and writer	Mount Lavinia	
Paulus Edward Pieris Deraniyagala	Paleontologist and zoologist		
Desmond Fernando	Doctor and inventor	Preparatory and Mount Lavinia	
S. C. Paul	Surgeon	Mount Lavinia	
Peter Selvaratnam	Musculoskeletal physiotherapist	Preparatory and Mount Lavinia	
Eric Wikramanayake	Conservationist and former Executive Director of Environmental Foundation Limited	Mount Lavinia	

== Military and defence ==
=== Military ===
Name	Branch	Notability	Campus	Reference
Adm Kanchana Banagoda RSP, USP	Sri Lanka Navy	Commander of the Navy (2024–2026)	Bandarawela	
Gratien Fernando	Ceylon Defence Force	Soldier and leader of Cocos Islands mutiny		
2Lt Basil Horsfall VC	British Army	Victoria Cross recipient (1918)	Mount Lavinia	
Gen Shantha Kottegoda WWV, RWP, RSP, VSV, USP	Sri Lanka Army	Commander of the Army (2004–2005)	Mount Lavinia	
ACM Paddy Mendis	Sri Lanka Air Force	Commander of the Air Force (1971–1976)	Mount Lavinia	
Henry Pedris	Ceylon Defence Force	Ceylonese militia officer and socialite	Mount Lavinia	
ACM Donald Perera VSV, USP	Sri Lanka Air Force	Commander of the Air Force (2002–2006)		
AVM P. B. Premachandra	Sri Lanka Air Force	Chief of Staff of the Sri Lanka Air Force (2006–?)	Mount Lavinia	
Maj Gen M.C. Mendaka. P. Samarasinghe RWP, RSP, USP	Sri Lanka Army	Chief of Staff of the Sri Lanka Army (2009–?)		
Maj Gen Gratian Silva VSV	Sri Lanka Army	Military Secretary	Mount Lavinia	
Adm H. A. Silva VSV	Sri Lanka Navy	Commander of the Navy (1986–1991)	Mount Lavinia	
Gen Srilal Weerasooriya RWP, RSP, VSV, USP	Sri Lanka Army	Commander of the Army (1988–2000)	Mount Lavinia	

=== Police ===
Name	Notability	Police	Reference
Aleric Abeygunawardena	Inspector General of Police (1967–1970)	Mount Lavinia	
Osmund De Silva OBE	Inspector General of Police (1955–1959)	Mount Lavinia	

== Politics and public service ==
=== Civil servants and other politicians ===
Name	Notability	Campus	Reference
Chanaka Amaratunga	Founder of the Liberal Party of Sri Lanka	Preparatory and Mount Lavinia	
Sir Solomon Dias Bandaranaike KCMG	Head Mudaliyar of the British Ceylon		
K. Ganeshalingam	Mayor of Colombo (1996–1997)	Mount Lavinia	
Uthum Herat	Deputy Governor of the Central Bank of Sri Lanka (2009)	Preparatory and Mount Lavinia	
Samuel Kadirgamar I	Proctor	Mutwal	
Palitha Kohona	Diplomat (2009–2015)	Mount Lavinia	
Maduwanwela Maha Disawe	Headman of British Ceylon		
Sir Paul Pieris CMG	Civil servant, historian and District Judge	Mutwal	
Namal Rajapaksa	Lawyer and Minister of Youth and Sports (2020–2022)	Mount Lavinia	
Lieutenant Yoshitha Rajapaksa	Sportsman, naval officer and Chief of Staff to Prime Minister of Sri Lanka (2020–2022)	Mount Lavinia	
M. Rajendra	Civil servant	Mount Lavinia	
Sir Arthur Ranasinghe CMG, CBE	Civil servant and Governor of the Central Bank of Ceylon	Mount Lavinia	
Manicasothy Saravanamuttu	Journalist and diplomat	Mount Lavinia	
Sir Ratnasothy Saravanamuttu	Mayor of Colombo (1937, 1941–1942)	Mount Lavinia	
Lt Col Sabdharatnajyoti Saravanamuttu MBE	Member of Colombo Municipal Council, lawyer and sports administrator	Mount Lavinia	
R. R. Selvadurai	Lawyer and civil servant	Mount Lavinia	
Kanagaratnam Sriskandan	Engineer and civil servant	Mount Lavinia	
Jeevan Thiagarajah	Executive Director of the Consortium of Humanitarian Agencies and Governor of the Northern Province (2021-2023)		
Bernard Tilakaratna	Diplomat and Secretary to the Ministry of Foreign Affairs (1989–1994)	Mount Lavinia	
Bradman Weerakoon	Secretary to the Prime Minister (1955–1970)	Mount Lavinia and Guruthalawa	
Sam Wijesinha	Clerk to the House of Representatives, Secretary General of Parliament, Parliamentary Commissioner for Administration and Crown Counsel	Mount Lavinia	

=== Parliamentarians ===
Name	Notability	Campus	Reference
Arthur Alvis	Lawyer and member of the Legislative Council of Ceylon	Mount Lavinia	
D. P. Atapattu	MP (1965–1970)	Matara and Mount Lavinia	
S. D. Bandaranayake	MP for Gampaha (1952–1989)	Mount Lavinia and Matara	
S. J. V. Chelvanayagam	MP for Kankesanthurai (1947–1952; 1956–1972; 1975–1977)	Mount Lavinia	
K. N. Choksy	National List MP (1989–2010), Minister of Finance (2001–2004)	Preparatory and Mount Lavinia	
Ronnie de Mel	MP for Devinuwara (1970–1989) and Matara (1994–2004) and Minister of Finance (1977–1988)	Mount Lavinia	
C. P. de Silva	MP for Polonnaruwa (1952–1960) and Minneriya (1960–1970); Ministry of Lands, Power and Irrigation (1956–1970); and Leader of the House (1960–1970)	Mount Lavinia	
A. J. R. de Soysa	Member of the Legislative Council of Ceylon (1911–?)		
William Ellawala	Member of the Legislative Council of Ceylon (1856), Rate Mahatmaya		
Leslie Goonewardene	MP for Panadura (1956–1977)		
Monty Gopallawa	Minister of Cultural Affairs (2000-2001), Governor of Central Province (2002-2005) and MP for Laggala (1970–1977) and Matale (1994–2001)	Preparatory and Mount Lavinia	
S. L. Gunasekara	Lawyer and National List MP	Mount Lavinia	
Panini Ilangakoon	MP for Weligama (1970–1977)	Preparatory and Mount Lavinia	
Sir Herbert Eric Jansz CMG	Senator, Parliamentary Secretary and Public Service Commission chairman	Mount Lavinia	
Tuan Burhanudeen Jayah	Member of Legislative Council (1924–1931) and State Council (1936–1947) and MP for Colombo Central (1947–1950)	Mount Lavinia	
Wilfred Miller Vincent Koch	Member of Legislative Council of Hong Kong and surgeon		
Godfrey Edward Madawala	Lawyer and member of Legislative Council and the State Council of Ceylon		
Tilak Marapana	National List MP, Minister of Foreign Affairs and Development Assignments, Attorney General of Sri Lanka, Solicitor General of Sri Lanka, Minister of Defence, Minister of Transport, Highways and Aviation, Minister of Law and Order and Prison Reforms	Mount Lavinia	
Nanda Mathew	Governor of Uva Province, Minister of Sports and MP	Gurutalawa and Mount Lavinia	
Sir Alfred Francis Molamure KBE	MP for Balangoda (1947–1951)	Mount Lavinia	
Donald Obeyesekere MBE	Member of Legislative Council and State Council of Ceylon and President of National Olympic Committee of Sri Lanka		
Sir Solomon Christoffel Obeyesekere	Lawyer and unofficial member of Legislative Council of Ceylon (1900–1916)		
Tikiri Bandara Panabokke I	Member of the Legislative Council of Ceylon, Police Magistrate for Kandy and acting Diyawadana Nilame		
Sir S. Pararajasingam	Senator		
G. L. Peiris	National List MP (1994–2015), Minister of Justice (1994–2001), Minister of Education (2020–2021) and Minister of Foreign Affairs (2021–2022)		
N. M. Perera	MP for Ruwanwella and Yatiyantota and Minister of Finance	Mount Lavinia	
Sajith Premadasa	MP (2000–present) and Minister of Housing, Construction and Cultural Affairs (2018-2019)	Preparatory	
Shashindra Rajapaksa	Chief Minister of Uva Province (2009–2015) and MP (2020–2024)		
Shelton Ranaraja	MP (1960-1965; 1978-1988-UNP)	Mount Lavinia and Gurutalawa	
Edmund Samarakkody	Lawyer and MP	Mount Lavinia	
Rukman Senanayake	MP (1973–1977, 1994–present)	Mount Lavinia	
Wasantha Senanayake	MP (2010–2020)	Mount Lavinia	
Peri Sundaram	Lawyer, member of the State Council of Ceylon and Senator	Mount Lavinia	
Murugeysen Tiruchelvam	MP, Senator and Solicitor General of Ceylon	Mount Lavinia	
U. B. Wanninayake	MP and Minister of Finance	Mount Lavinia	
J. D. Weerasekera	MP	Mount Lavinia	
Kumara Welgama	MP for Kalutara (1994–2024), Minister of Industrial Development (2007–2010) and Minister of Transport (2010–2015)	Preparatory and Mount Lavinia	
Henry Lorensz Wendt	Lawyer, judge and member of the Legislative Council of Ceylon		
Gen Ranjan Wijeratne	National List MP, Minister of Foreign Affairs, Minister of Plantation Industries and State Minister of Defence	Guruthalawa and Mount Lavinia	
Rajiva Wijesinha	National List MP (2010–2015)		
E. B. Wikramanayake	Senator and Minister of Justice (1953–1956)		

=== Prime Ministers ===
Name	Notability	Campus	Reference
S. W. R. D. Bandaranaike	MP for Attanagalla (1947–1959) and Prime Minister of Ceylon (1956–1959)	Mutwal and Mount Lavinia	
Wijeyananda Dahanayake	MP for Galle (1947–1977, 1979–1988) and Prime Minister of Ceylon (1959–1960)	Mount Lavinia	
D. S. Senanayake	MP for Mirigama (1947–1952) and Prime Minister of Ceylon (1947–1952)		
Dudley Senanayake	MP for Dedigama (1947–1956, 1957–1970) and Prime Minister of Ceylon (1952–1953, 1960, 1965–1970)	Mount Lavinia	

== Religion ==
Name	Notability	Campus	Reference
Anagarika Dharmapala	Buddhist revivalist	Mutwal and Mount Lavinia	
Dushantha Lakshman Rodrigo	16th Anglican Bishop of Colombo (2020 to present)	Mount Lavinia	

== Sport ==
Name	Notability	Campus	Reference
Saliya Ahangama	Cricket coach and former cricketer	Mount Lavinia	
Kaushik Amalean	International test cricket player (1986–1988)	Mount Lavinia	
Neil Chanmugam	First-class cricketer	Mount Lavinia	
Dennis Chanmugam	First-class cricketer	Mount Lavinia	
Guy de Alwis	International test cricket player (1983–1988)	Mount Lavinia	
Col Fredrick de Saram OBE ED	First-class cricketer		
Trevelyan Edward	First-class cricketer		
Rupert Ferdinands	Tennis player	Mount Lavinia	
Nisal Fernando	Cricketer	Mount Lavinia	
Tharindu Fernando	Cricketer	Mount Lavinia	
Upekha Fernando	First-class cricketer	Mount Lavinia	
Lareef Idroos	Cricketer	Mount Lavinia	
Michael Jayasekera	Rugby union player	Mount Lavinia	
Aubrey Kuruppu	Cricketer		
Nisham Mazahir	Cricketer	Mount Lavinia	
Duleep Mendis	International test cricket player (1982–1988)	Mount Lavinia	
Jeevan Mendis	One Day International, Twenty20 International cricketer (2010–2018)	Mount Lavinia	
P. L. Munasinghe	Rugby union player	Mount Lavinia	
Mevan Peiris	First-class and one-day cricketer	Mount Lavinia	
Dan Piachaud	First-class cricketer	Mount Lavinia	
Ian Pieris	First-class cricketer		
Mano Ponniah	First-class cricketer (1964–1969), architect and engineer	Mount Lavinia	
Vernon Prins	First-class cricketer		
Rohitha Rajapaksa	Club cricketer	Mount Lavinia	
Buddy Reid	First-class cricketer		
Ishak Sahabdeen	One Day International cricket player (1983–1984) and International hockey player (1985–1986)	Mount Lavinia	
Paikiasothy Saravanamuttu	Sports administrator and civil servant	Mount Lavinia	
Kaushal Silva	International test cricket player (2011–2016)	Mount Lavinia	
Allan Smith	Olympic diver (1952)	Mount Lavinia	
Rizvi Suhayb	Cricketer	Mount Lavinia	
Anura Tennekoon	One Day International cricket player (1975–1979)	Mount Lavinia	
Wasim Thajudeen	Rugby union player	Preparatory and Mount Lavinia	
B. W. R. Thomas	Cricketer	Mount Lavinia	
Michael Tissera	One Day International cricket player (1975)	Mount Lavinia	
Thomas Tweed	First-class cricketer		
Kapila Wijegunawardene	International test cricket player (1991–1992)	Mount Lavinia	
Niroshan Wijekoon	Badminton player and first badminton player to represent Sri Lanka at the Olympics; held the Sri Lankan National Badminton Championships singles title for nine years (1983–1987 and 1989–1992)		
Oscar Wijesinghe	Athlete	Mount Lavinia	
Bertie Wijesinha	Cricketer	Mount Lavinia	
Ray Wijewardene	Olympic sailor (1968) and engineer	Mount Lavinia	
