= Arittha R Wikramanayake =

Sri Lankan lawyer

- Occupation: Attorney at Law
- Known for: Director General of the Securities and Exchange Commission of Sri Lanka, member of the Public Enterprises Reform Commission of Sri Lanka and the Sri Lanka Accounting and Auditing Standards Board, practice of Corporate Law, Securities Law and Trade Law

Arittha R Wikramanayake is a Sri Lankan attorney at law specialising in corporate law, securities law and trade law.

== Family ==
Wikramanayake's family association with law can be traced back to Crown Proctorship in Galle in 1848.

== Education school ==
Like his brothers Eric Wikramanayake and Athula Wikramanayake, father Elanga Wikramanayake (Solicitor General), grandfather (Senator E. B. Wikramanayake, Minister of Justice) and great-grandfather he was educated at S. Thomas' College, Mt Lavinia Sri Lanka. Wikramanayake represented the school in First XI Cricket in the Royal-Thomian rivalry, in a side which were All Island Interschool Cricket Champions where teammates included Saliya Ahangama, Guy de Alwis, Michael Jayasekera and Ishak Shahabdeen, captained the second XI cricket team coached by Quentin Israel and was a school prefect. Among his teachers were Arisen Ahubudu, and D.S. Jayasekera while contemporaries in school included Richard de Zoysa, Chanaka Amaratunga, Uthum Herat, Saliya Ahangama, Guy de Alwis, Devaka Fernando Palitha Kohona, Mendaka Samarasinghe and PL Munasinghe. He later served on the board of governors of the college.

== Education professional ==
Wikramanayake was admitted to the bar in Sri Lanka in 1980, having attended the Sri Lanka Law College. He later obtained master's degrees in law from the schools of law at the Vrije Universitiet, Brussels, Belgium, the University of Georgia, Athens, Georgia, US, and Master of Arts in Law and Diplomacy (MALD) from the Fletcher School of Law and Diplomacy, Tufts University, Massachusetts, US, and a Ph.D. in law from the University of Colombo.

== Professional career ==
Wikramanayake joined the Attorney General's Department of Sri Lanka as a state counsel and left the Attorney General's Department to take up an appointment as the director general of the Securities and Exchange Commission of Sri Lanka. He held this position as chief executive officer of the SEC while as director general of the SEC, he held positions as a member of the Public Enterprises Reform Commission of Sri Lanka and the Sri Lanka Accounting and Auditing Standards Board.

In 1997 he resigned from public service and established the law firm Nithya Partners.

Wikramanayake contributes to national bodies through service in committees for formulating codes on corporate governance established by the Institute of Chartered Accountants of Sri Lanka, the Securities and Exchange Commission of Sri Lanka and committees on corporate law appointed by the Government of Sri Lanka and the National Review Committee, to which he was appointed by the Ministry of Finance to review performance of State owned enterprises. In 2009, Wikramanayake was appointed by the Central Bank of Sri Lanka to a four-member expert panel to advise financial institutions on making use of a stimulus package offered by the Government of Sri Lanka to overcome the effects of the financial crisis. He continues to speak and write on issues of national interest. He is also the author of Company Law in Sri Lanka and a co-author of Law and Philanthropy in South Asia.

== Contributions to conservation ==
He is also known for his photography and publications on wildlife. His publications include Butterflies of Sri Lanka (co authored with his daughter, Ariesha Wikramanayake) and Wildflowers of Sri Lanka, continuing an association (comparable to that with the law and S. Thomas' College, Mt Lavinia) lasting 3 generations or more (his grandfather E. B. Wikramanayake founder president of the Wildlife Protection Society of Sri Lanka and also served as a member of the S. Thomas' College, Mt Lavinia board of governors).
