= Eric Wikramanayake =

Sri Lankan conservationist

- Education: Bsc Biology (Summa cum laude); MSc Biology; PhD Ecology
- Alma mater: S. Thomas' College, Mount Lavinia; University of California, Davis
- Occupation: Conservationist
- Board member of: Executive Director at Environmental Foundation Limited

Eric D. Wikramanayake is a Sri Lankan conservationist.

== Early life and education ==
He was born to Elanga Wikramanayake, a lawyer. His brothers are Arittha R Wikramanayake and Athula Wikramanayake; his grandfather was E. B. Wikramanayake. He was educated at S. Thomas' College, Mt Lavinia.

Wikramanayake represented the school in Cricket and captained the second XI cricket team coached by Quentin Israel and was a school prefect. Classmates included Saliya Ahangama, Guy de Alwis, PL Munasinghe, Paul R. Mather, Stefan D'Silva, Uthum Herat, Chanaka Amaratunga and Devaka Fernando.

He obtained a BS in Biology (Summa Cum Laude) and M.S. in Biology from Slippery Rock University, Pennsylvania and a PhD in Ecology from University of California, Davis, California.

== Career ==
He has worked as a Postdoctoral Fellow and Research Assistant/Visiting Scientist Smithsonian Institution, Washington, D.C., USA a Senior Conservation Scientist at World Wildlife Fund, Asia, USA. He is currently a research associate at Smithsonian Institution, Washington, D.C., USA and a Trustee at the Centre for Conservation and Research, Sri Lanka.

His work has included mammalian biology, ecological structure and conservation of fish assemblages in tropical wet-zone streams of Sri Lanka and the thermal ecology and behavior of monitor lizards, including the largest lizard in the world, the Komodo dragon that lives on three small islands in eastern Indonesia.

He has provided technical assistance and advice to WWF's ecoregion-based conservation program and flagship species (elephant, rhino, and tiger) programs in Asia.

He is the former executive director and the current Chairperson of Environmental Foundation Limited, a public interest litigation organization that aims to conserve and protect the environment.

== See also ==
- Environmental Foundation Limited
