= Wikramanayake =

Wikramanayake is a surname. Notable people with the surname include:

- Arittha R Wikramanayake, Sri Lankan lawyer
- Athula Wikramanayake, Sri Lankan American developmental biologist
- Elanga Wikramanayake, Sri Lankan lawyer
- Eric Bird Wikramanayake, Ceylonese statesman and lawyer, Minister of Justice
- Eric Wikramanayake, Sri Lankan conservationist
- Gihan Wikramanayake (1960-2018), Sri Lankan academic
- Jayathma Wickramanayake (born 1990), Sri Lankan activist and UN Special Envoy on Youth
- V. S. de S. Wikramanayake (1876-1952), Sri Lankan politician
