= Ishak Sahabdeen =

Sri Lankan cricketer and hockey player

Ishak Shahabdeen
- Occupation: Company Director
- Known for: Cricket and Hockey International

Ishak Shahabdeen is a Sri Lankan double international who represented his country in both Cricket and Hockey.

== St Sylvesters ==
Sahabdeen was educated at St. Sylvester's College, Kandy where he represented the college in cricket and hockey. He was adjudged outstation cricketer of the year in 1974

In hockey he captained the under 16 and 19 teams of St. Sylvester's and led them to the Kandy Schools Championship in 1974. He scored 16 goals against Nugawela Central College. In 1973 he represented Sri Lanka Schools and was captain in 1976.

== S Thomas' College ==
He moved to S. Thomas' College, Mt Lavinia Sri Lanka, where he won colours in Cricket, Hockey and Athletics. In Athletics he was part of a relay team which included rugby players PL Munasinghe, Devaka Fernando and Michael Jayasekera.

He played First XI cricket in a team captained by Sasi Ganeshan. Other teammates included Saliya Ahangama, Guy de Alwis, Arittha R Wikramanayake and Michael Jayasekera. In 1976, he was a member of the Sri Lanka under 19 team that toured Pakistan.

== Club Cricket ==
Sahabdeen played first class cricket for the Tamil Union Cricket Club under the captaincy of the late S.S. Kumar in the P. Saravanamuttu Trophy tournament. He transferred his allegiance to the Moors SC and was captain of the side in 1985.

== Club Hockey ==
Sahabdeen played for the Burgher Recreation Club. The club won the Andriesz Shield, Pioneer Cup and seven-a-side Pettah Pharmacy Gold Cup. He scored 120 goals in one calendar year while representing BRC, Mackwoods and Mercantile Hockey Association.

== International Cricket ==
He first played for Sri Lanka in a one-day fixture against Zimbabwe in 1983, toured Sharjah in 1984 for the first ever Asia Cup against India and Pakistan. His next assignment was in a one-day game against New Zealand in 1984.

In 2005, he represented Sri Lanka in Indoor Cricket in the Masters Tournament in New Zealand.

== International Hockey ==
While still a schoolboy he represented the country against the visiting West German team. He also represented Sri Lanka at the Asian Games. In 1985 and 1986, he represented Sri Lanka against Singapore and Oman twice and in 1985 captained Sri Lanka against Singapore

== Snooker ==
Sahabdeen is also a noted snooker player.

== Sports Administration ==
Sahabdeen has continued to be involved in sport after retiring and has served as the Chairman of the Tournament Committee of the Mercantile Cricket Association, Vice President of the Association of Cricket Umpires Union and Chairman of the Disciplinary Committee
