= Michael Jayasekera =

- Occupations: Engineer, Company Director
- Known for: Rugby player and Rugby administrator

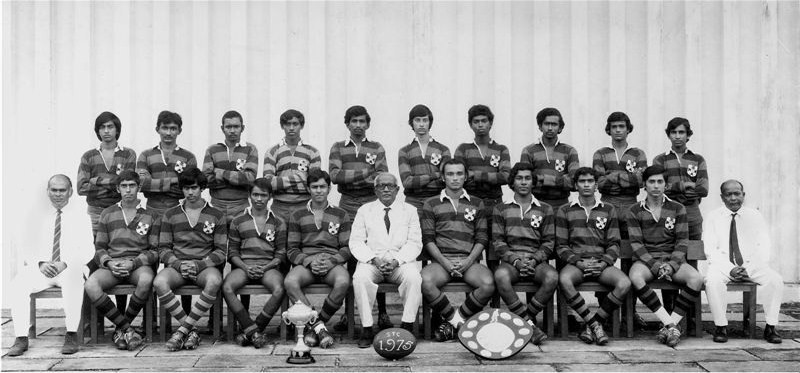
'S Thomas College 1st XV Rugby Team 1975 Standing L to R Charith Wickramathilake, Ananda Welikala, Darup Pieris, SKN Fernando, Rienzie Fernando, Shane Pinder, Devaka Fernando, Rohitha Attygalle, Michael Jayasekera, Tushitha Ranasinghe Seated L to R Mr Quentin Israel (Coach), Mahes Abeynaike, Theadore Thambapillai, Pat Jacob, PL Munasinghe (Captain) Mr SJ Anandanayagam (Warden) Stefan D'Silva, Peter Vanniasingham, Loka Thilakaratne, Wilhelm Bogstra, Mr Lassie Abeywardena (Master in Charge)

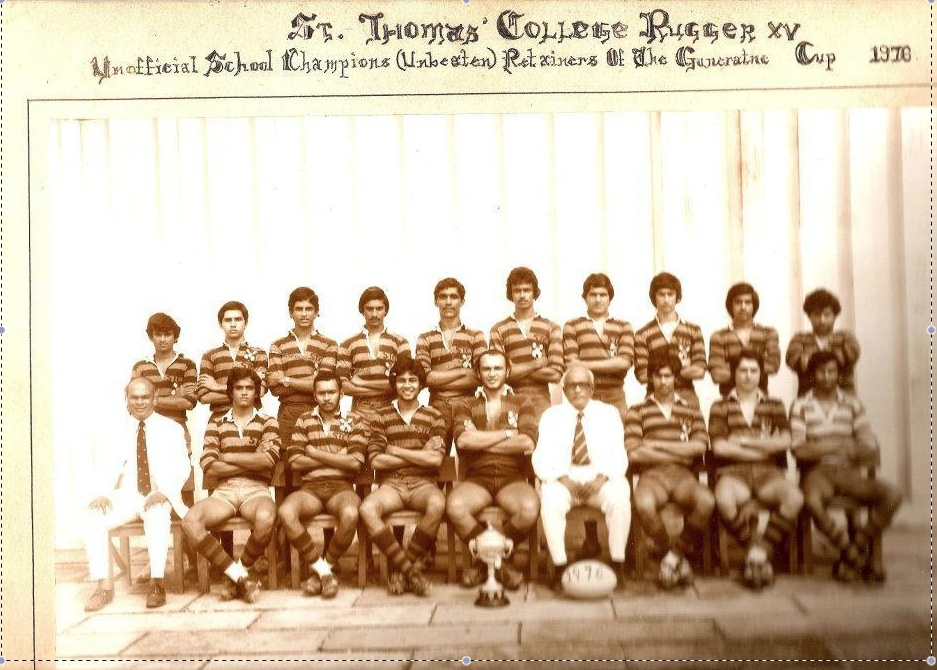
S Thomas' College Rugby 1st XV Team 1976 Standing: Avindre de Silva, R Wadugodapitiya, Eraj Gihan Ratnaike, Dyalan Supramanium, Kapila Waidyaratne, Jeya Poniah, Jeyakumar, Shane Pinder, Charith Wickramathilake, Wazil Hafeel Seated: Quentin Israel (Coach) Michael Jayasekera, Darup Pieris, PL Munasinghe, Stefan D'Silva (Captain), Mr SJ Anandanayagam (Warden) Theadore Thambipillai, Wilhelm Bogtsra, Rienzie Fernando

Michael Jayasekera is a Sri Lankan former rugby player.

== Education ==
Jayasekera was educated at St Peters College Bambalapitiya where he represented the college in First XV Rugby and moved to S. Thomas' College, Mt Lavinia Sri Lanka, where he won colours in cricket, rugby and athletics. He won the Gold medal in the under 19 110 metres Hurdles at the Public Schools Athletics meet in 1975 He played First XI cricket in a team captained by Sasi Ganeshan and played as a member of the Sri Lanka Schools under 19 team Other teammates included Saliya Ahangama, Guy de Alwis, Arittha R Wikramanayake and Ishak Shahabdeen. Sharm de Alwis refers to Jayasekera protesting at Trinity's slow scoring by bowling underarm.

== School rugby ==
Jayasekera played for the Rugby first XV in 1975 (under PL Munasinghe) and 1976 (under Stefan D'Silva's captaincy). teammates in rugby included PL Munasinghe, Stefan D'Silva (Author), Rienzie Fernando, Shane Pinder, Dr Peter Vanniasingham and Professor Devaka Fernando in the 1975 Rugby team coached by Quentin Israel later described as "the best Thomian team" by sports journalist Sharm de Alwis.

== Club and national rugby ==
He went on to represent Havelock Sports Club and Sri Lanka in a partnership with fellow centre three quarter PL Munasinghe Jayasekera is regarded as one of the best threequarters to play rugby between 1968 and 1982. He later served as a rugby administrator as chairman of the board of selectors and vice president of the Sri Lanka Rugby Football Union. He contested the post of president of the Sri Lanka Rugby Football Union

== Personal life ==
Micheal Jayasekera was formerly vice president - head of engineering & Projects Leisure Sector at John Keells Holdings. Currently he is the general manager at Colombo City Centre Partners (pvt) Ltd, the owners and developers of the 48-storey mega mixed development, Colombo City Centre.
