= Jagath Gunawardana =

Lawyer, environmentalist and educator based in Sri Lanka

Attorney-at-law Jagath Gunawardana
- Born: 1961 (age 64–65)
- Education: Sri Lanka Law College (L.L.B, Ph.D.)
- Occupation: Lawyer
- Known for: Environmental activism, volunteerism, advocacy
- Awards: Presidential Award for the Excellency in the Field of Environment; Harithabhimani - Presidential Award for the Excellency in the Field of Wildlife
- Honours: Honorary PhD; University of Sri Jayewardenepura

Jagath Gunawardana (Sinhala: ජගත් ගුණවර්ධන) is a lawyer, environmentalist and educator based in Sri Lanka. Gunawardana is known for his advocacy in wildlife conservation and environmental protection.

== Early life and education ==
Gunawardana was born in 1961 in Sri Lanka. He completed a Diploma in Agriculture at the Aquinas University College with first-class honours. Later, he went on to become a lawyer by graduating from the Sri Lankan Law College.

He was awarded an Honorary Doctorate from the University of Sri Jayawardenapura for his contributions towards environmental protection.

== Activism and work ==
In 1986, he joined the Ceylon Bird Club and in 1987 he joined the Field Ornithology Group of Sri Lanka.

He is an advisor to the Environmental Foundation Limited and a Senior Instructor of the Young Zoologist Association which he joined in 1978 where he volunteers to educate youth on environmental conservation.

Gunawardana also serves as a member of the National Environment Council of Central Environmental Authority (CEA).

His work involves environmental policy amendments, awareness on the legal aspect of environmental issues and environmental awareness to strengthen conservation.

== Awards and recognition ==
In 2016, Gunawardana was awarded the Presidential Award for the Excellency in the Field of Environment and honoured with the title of Harithabhimani, the Presidential Lifetime Award for Service to Wildlife Conservation.

In honour of his conservation work, a newly discovered frog species in highlands was named after him as Pseudophilautus jagathgunawardanai or Jagath Gunawardana's shrub frog.
