= Paul R. Mather =

Australian of Sri Lankan origin

Paul Rohan Mather
- Occupations: Accountant, University Professor
- Title: Head, La Trobe Business School and Professor of Accounting

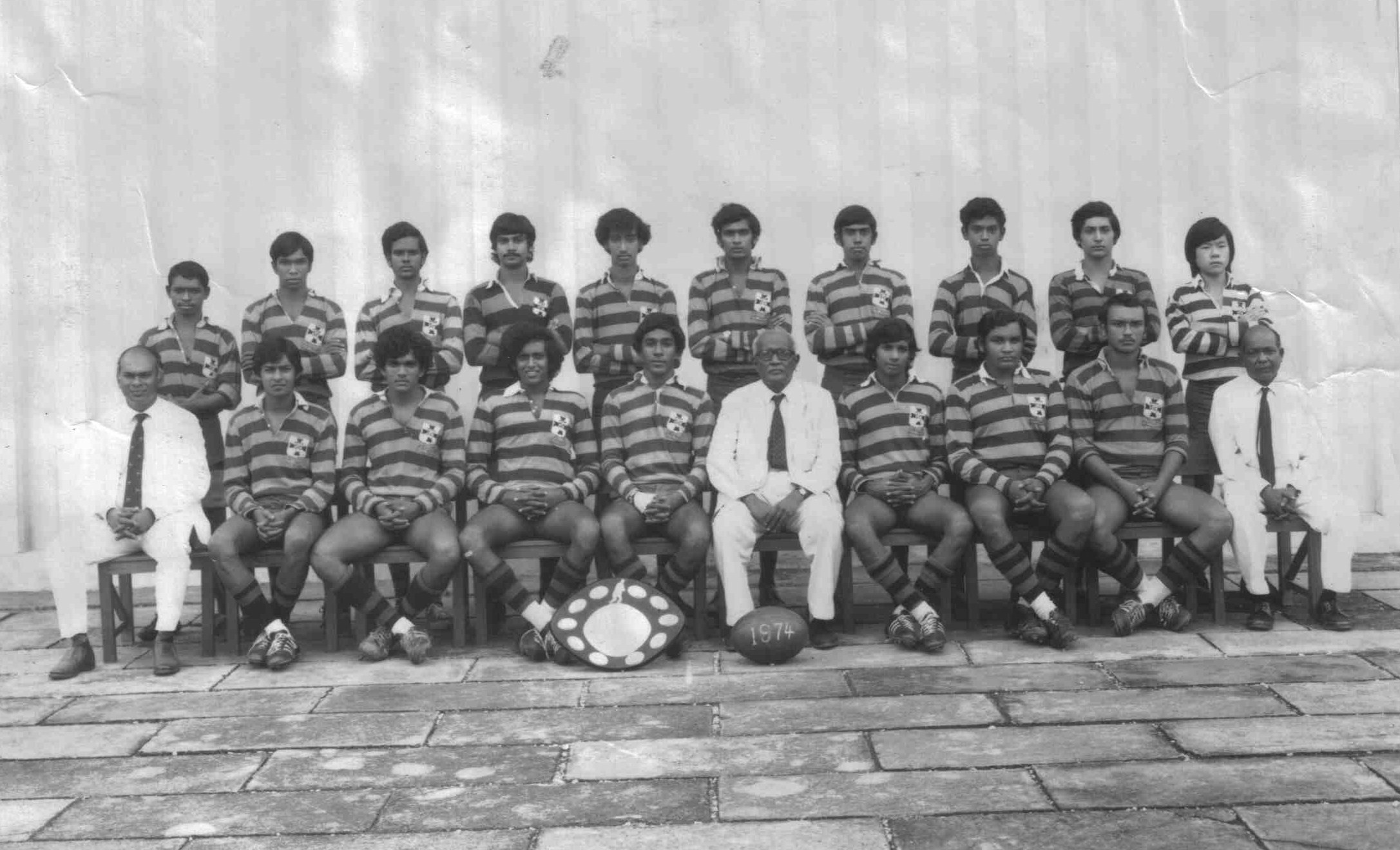
S Thomas College 1st XV Rugby Football Team 1974

Paul Rohan Mather is an Australian of Sri Lankan origin who is professor of accounting and finance at La Trobe University, Australia.

== School education ==
Mather was educated at S. Thomas' College, Mt Lavinia from 1963 to 1974 where he was School Prefect, Captain of Swimming, Vice – Captain of Basketball, Water-Polo and was awarded college colours in 1st XV Rugby (Playing under the captaincy of Peter Vanniasingham alongside Stefan D'Silva, PL Munasinghe and Professor Devaka Fernando), Swimming, Water Polo and Basketball. His teachers and house masters in the boarding school included Rev Duleep De Chickera and Quentin Israel.

== University and professional education ==
He obtained an MA in Accounting and Finance University of Lancaster UK, PhD in Accounting and Finance from Monash University in additions to Fellowships in accounting such as FCA (England and Wales) and FCPA.

Mather has been Associate Dean (Research Degrees) in the Faculty of Business and Economics and an associate professor at Monash University, Melbourne while also holding visiting appointments at the London School of Economics and the University of Liverpool Management School. Prior to becoming an academic, he trained and qualified as a chartered accountant with Ernst and Young in London and subsequently spent eight years with PwC in London and West Africa including 18 months as a general practice partner in West Africa. He became increasingly involved in corporate finance and other special projects in London and Melbourne and was largely involved in projects relating to mergers and acquisitions, due diligence reviews and business valuations. Over the years, he has also been seconded to industry on several occasions. He is a member of CPA Australia's Divisional Council and has been a member of various CPA Australia committees and working parties.

Mather is currently the Head of La Trobe Business School and a professor of accounting at La Trobe University in Melbourne, Australia.

== Research ==
Mather has published research on debt contracting processes, the role of corporate governance in mitigating agency problems, behavioral research in accounting as well as the earnings, impression management of financial information, technical default in private debt markets and the economic circumstances surrounding the use of covenants in private debt contracts.

Mather has published in peer reviewed journals such as Abacus, Accounting and Business Research, Accounting, Auditing and Accountability Journal, Accounting and Finance, Australian Journal of Management, Pacific Basin Finance Journal and the British Journal of Management.

== Honours and awards ==
He has been awarded the best paper awards for publications in the Accounting Research Journal and JASSA, the Journal of the Securities Institute of Australia and he received a Dean's Award for Teaching Excellence at Monash University.

== Voluntary activities ==
Mather is a level 2 accredited ARU coach who has been coach to the Harlequin Rugby club and the Victorian Junior State teams. He has also assisted his alma mater S. Thomas' College, Mt Lavinia by conducting rugby coaching workshops in Sri Lanka.
