= Gunasiri =

Gunasiri is a surname. Notable people with the surname include:

- Chethika Gunasiri, Sri Lankan environmental scientist
- Nimantha Gunasiri (born 1996), Sri Lankan cricketer
