= Kuruppu =

Kuruppu is both a given name and a surname. Notable people with the name include:

- Kuruppu Karunaratne (1960–2008), Sri Lankan long-distance runner
- Aubrey Kuruppu (1945–2019), Sri Lankan cricketer
- Brendon Kuruppu (born 1962), Sri Lankan cricketer
- Jayaweera Kuruppu (1908–1962), Ceylonese politician
- Oshadi Kuruppu (1994–2022), Sri Lankan badminton player
