= Liberal Democratic Party (Sri Lanka) =

- Leader: Kamal Nissanka
- President: Shirman Gunathilaka
- Secretary-General: K.S.T Perera
- Founder: Chanaka Amaratunga
- Founded: 19 January 1987 (39 years ago)
- Split from: United National Party
- Preceded by: Council for Liberal Democracy
- Headquarters: No 583, Jude Mawatha, Kandana
- Ideology: Liberal democracy
- Political position: Centre
- Continental affiliation: Council of Asian Liberals and Democrats
- International affiliation: Liberal International
- Colors: Golden yelow [sic?] with bleck [sic?]
- Parliament of Sri Lanka: 0 / 225
- Local Government: 1 / 8,356

Election symbol
- Book

Website
- www.ldp.lk

The Liberal Democratic Party (Sinhala: ලිබරල් ප්‍රජාතන්ත්‍රවාදී පක්ෂය Libaral Pakshaya; Tamil: லிபரல் கட்சி, romanized: Liparal Kaṭci), formerly known as the Liberal Party is a political party in Sri Lanka which initially began as a think-tank called the Council for Liberal Democracy. The party was founded in 1981 by Chanaka Amaratunga, a longstanding member of the United National Party, which was at the time the ruling party of Sri Lanka.

The CLD split from the UNP in 1982 following the controversial parliamentary term extension referendum, which postponed parliamentary elections for six years. After four years of attempts to promote liberal thinking in Sri Lanka, in particular with regard to constitutional reforms that would promote devolution along with separation and reduction of powers at the center, Amaratunga and several of his associates eventually relaunched the CLD as the Liberal Party in February 1987.

Though the party never established itself as an electoral success, the Liberal Party continued to have an impact as a think-tank. It contributed seminally to the manifestos of presidential candidates Sirimavo Bandaranaike and Gamini Dissanayake in 1988 and 1994 respectively.

In 1996, Amaratunga died in a car crash, which led to a significant reduction in party activity. Amaratunga's successor Rajiva Wijesinha ran as the Liberal Party candidate in the 1999 presidential elections and was the 6th most-voted candidate.

On 19 June 2022, the Liberal Party was renamed as the Liberal Democratic Party. The first congress of the LDP was held on 26 July 2022. Kamal Nissanka is the current leader of the party and Amal Randeniya is the current general secretary.

== See also ==
- Liberalism
- Contributions to liberal theory
- Liberalism worldwide
- List of liberal parties
- Liberal democracy
