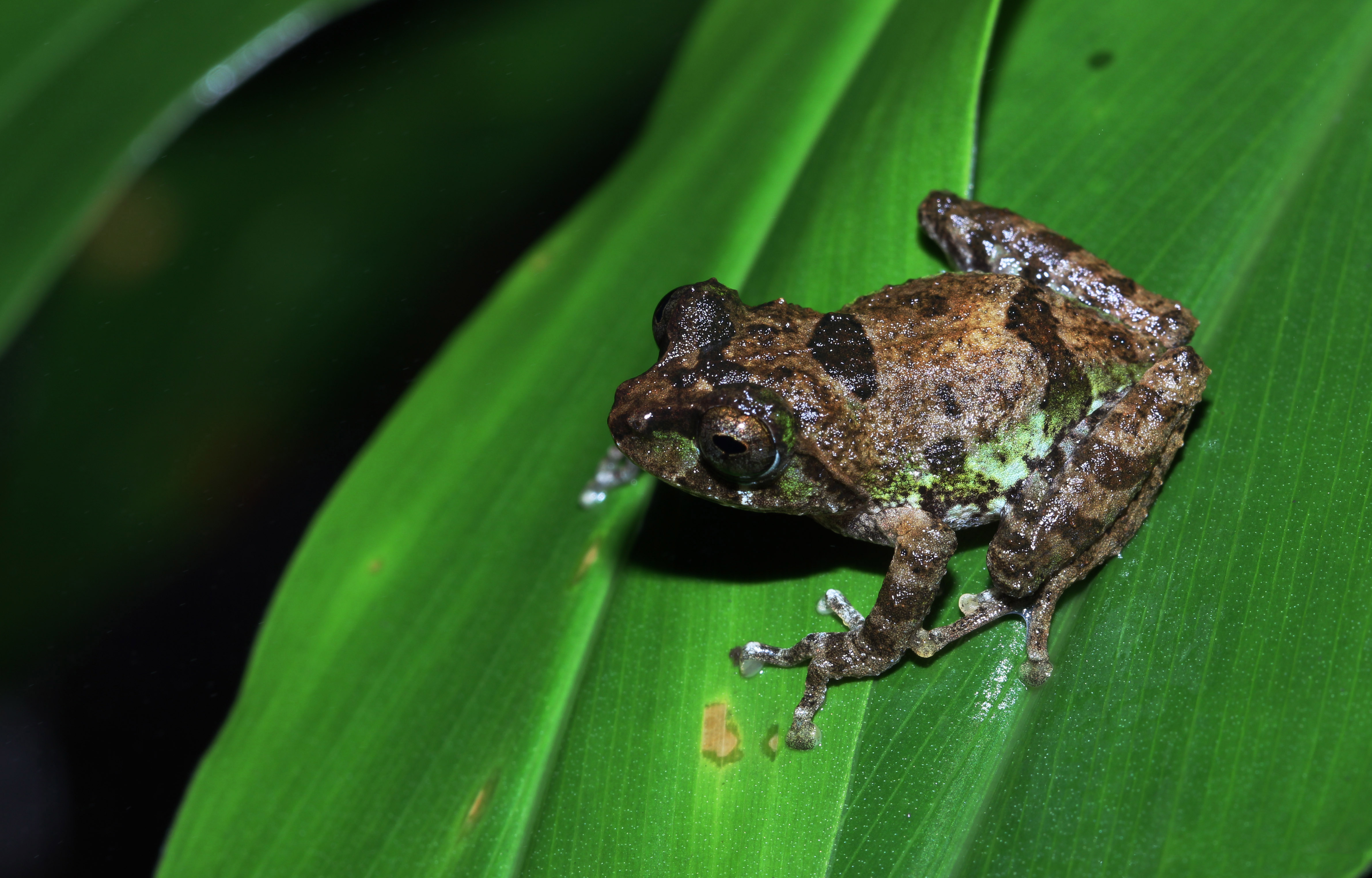

Conservation status
- Critically Endangered (IUCN 3.1)

Scientific classification
- Kingdom: Animalia
- Phylum: Chordata
- Class: Amphibia
- Order: Anura
- Family: Rhacophoridae
- Genus: Pseudophilautus
- Species: P. jagathgunawardanai

Binomial name
- Pseudophilautus jagathgunawardanai Wickramasinghe et al, 2013

= Pseudophilautus jagathgunawardanai =

Species of amphibian

Pseudophilautus jagathgunawardanai (Jagath Gunawardana's shrub frog) is a species of frogs in the family Rhacophoridae, endemic to Sri Lanka.

Its natural habitats are wet lowland forests of Sri Lanka. It is threatened by habitat loss. Scientists have seen it in exactly one place: Sripada Peak between 1600 and 1750 meters above sea level. It is one of the 8 species of rhacophorids that was discovered from Adam's Peak in 2013.

Scientists have seen it in exactly one place: Sripada Peak between 1600 and 1750 meters above sea level.

Pseudophilautus jagathgunawardanai in Peak Wilderness Sanctuary

This frog lives in cloud forests. It has been observed from ground level to as high as 6 m up in the trees. It prefers trees with lichen on the bark.

The adult female frog measures 35.8 – 40.4 mm long in snout-vent length. The skin of the dorsum is light brown in color with dark brown color over the eyes and a dark brown triangular mark on the head. The flanks are olive green in color. The legs are light brown in color with some green. The feet have dark brown marks on them. The ends of the toes and the belly are off-white in color.

Like other frogs in Pseudophilautus, P. jagathgunawardanai hatches out of its eggs as small frogs. They never swim as tadpoles.

Scientists attribute this frog's endangered status to habitat loss from urbanization, logging, and increased agriculture and pasturage.

Scientists named this frog after Dr. Jagath Gunawardana, a lawyer and naturalist who made great efforts toward conservation in Sri Lanka.
