= R. D. Gunaratne =

Ranil Dion Guneratne
- Born: Sri Lanka
- Education: University of Colombo; S. Thomas' College, Mt Lavinia
- Occupation: Retired
- Employer: University of Colombo
- Known for: National Chess Player, former CEO science and Technology Commission, Chess Administrator, Chemist, Academic
- Title: Doctor
- Board member of: Vice President Sri Lanka Chess Federation, Secretary Sri Lanka Chess Federation, Secretary International Relations Institute of Chemistry

Dr Ranil Dion Guneratne (B.Sc. (Colombo), M.Sc., Ph.D. (Cornell), F.I.Chem.C) is a Sri Lankan chess player, chess administrator, chemist, scientist, academic and science administrator.

== Education ==
Guneratne, like his grandfather E. B. Wikramanayake, was educated at S. Thomas' College, Mt Lavinia. and Faculty of Science, University of Colombo. He was Head Prefect of the College (1976) and was a member of the English Debating and Drama Societies, a Junior Librarian, Co-Editor of the College Magazine (with Chanaka Amaratunga and Richard de Zoysa, Leader of the Classical Quiz competition team (with Rohan Edirisinghe, Richard de Zoysa Uthum Herat, Chanaka Amaratunga and Devaka Fernando), a member of the Science Quiz team which reached the semi-finals of the national competition (with Uthum Herat Professor Chandu de Silva and Devaka Fernando), Tent Secretary of the Royal-Thomian Tent Committee and President of the Photographic Society. He was Captain of the Chess team in 1974, President Chess Society and was awarded Colours in Chess. Other classmates included Russell de Mel and Ivan Corea. Guneratne graduated from the University of Colombo in 1980 with a B.Sc. in Chemistry with First Class Honours.

== Chess ==
Guneratne was a chess player of national and international repute considered a match for the best Indian players at the time along with Arjuna Parakrama, and the Aturupane brothers. After retirement from competition he went on to serve the Sri Lanka Chess Federation as Secretary and Vice President. Guneratne also served in similar capacities to the Chess Association of Sri Lanka in which he was a founder member.

== Academic life ==
After completing his Ph.D. at Cornell University in the U.S.A. in 1987, Guneratne spent 3 years as a post-doctoral research associate at the University of Iowa. He then joined the Faculty of Bennington College, Bennington, Vermont. In 1995, he moved to Spring Hill College, Mobile, Alabama, where he was promoted to Associate Professor. In 2000, he returned to Sri Lanka to join the Department of Chemistry at the Open University of Sri Lanka. He later moved to the University of Colombo, where he served on the career guidance and other committees of the Faculty of Science, as well as the University Senate, until his retirement in 2017.

== Institute of Chemistry ==
Guneratne is a Fellow of the Institute of Chemistry, served as Secretary for International Relations of the Institute of Chemistry.

== National Science and Technology Commission ==
Guneratne was seconded as Director and CEO to the National Science and Technology Commission to promote development of science and research.
