= R. S. de Saram =

Reginald Stewart de Saram
- Born: 1898; Ceylon
- Died: 1986 (aged 87–88); Sri Lanka
- Education: S. Thomas' College, Mt Lavinia; Keble College, Cuddlestone
- Occupations: Clergyman, Warden of S. Thomas College
- Employer(s): Keble College, College, S. Thomas' College, Mt Lavinia
- Known for: Services to education
- Title: Reverend Canon
- Board member of: National Education Commission

Reverend Canon Reginald Stewart de Saram MA (Oxon) OBE, Warden of S. Thomas’ College, Mt Lavinia, was an educationist and clergyman known for services to education, as the co-founder of S. Thomas College, Gurutalawa, and for services to Ceylon in the Languages Commission.

== Early life and family ==
De Saram was born in 1898. He was educated at S. Thomas’ College, Mutwal between 1904 and 1917. He played in the Royal-Thomian cricket matches from 1915-1917 as an accurate off spinner, captained the football team and won his colours in boxing. T. D. S. A. Dissanayake states that he had a natural flair for leadership and was a devout Christian showing an inclination towards priesthood while at school. He was known by schoolboys by the nickname Kunji.

De Saram married Edith née Clarke of Oxford at the Cathedral in Mutwal.

== Keble College Oxford ==
De Saram attended Keble College, Oxford University, where he read classics. He earned a Blue in boxing. He studied theology at Ripon College Cuddesdon Theological College in Oxford in 1924 and was ordained a priest in 1925.,

== S. Thomas’ College ==
De Saram was appointed sub-warden of S. Thomas’ College Mt Lavinia in 1926, acting warden in 1930 and warden in 1932, serving till 1958. He was the first Ceylonese and first old boy of the school to become Warden of the college.

De Saram took over from Warden KC McPherson. He is also credited for having introduced both classical Sinhala and Hela Basa to S. Thomas’ College Mt Lavinia through recruitment of teachers such as Arisen Ahubudu, Sandadas Coperehewa, GL Jinadasa and D.S. Jayasekera. He introduced the use of the college crest in 1947, which is still in use.

== Services to church and government of Ceylon ==
During the second world war when the school was evacuated to Gurutalawa he also served as the first Ceylonese vicar of the Holy Trinity Church, Nuwara Eliya, in addition to his responsibilities as Warden.

De Saram was appointed to the National Education Commission by D.S. Senanayake in 1949. He also served on the National Languages Commission. In 1955 he was appointed to the Board of Residence and Discipline of the University of Ceylon, by the Vice Chancellor SirNicholas Attygalle.

== Honours ==
De Saram was awarded the OBE for his services to education in 1950. The annual rugby match between Trinity College and S. Thomas’ College Mt Lavinia is played for the Canon R. S. de Saram Trophy, which was first awarded in 1978, de Saram house in the college is named after him, as is a bursary. A bust unveiled in 2006 stands in the College office. A felicitation volume honouring him was edited by Mervyn Cassie-Chetty. The road running through S Thomas’ College was named de Saram Road in his honour.

== Character and personal attributes ==
De Saram had a reputation for being a strict disciplinarian and of a forthright nature. At the official function at which de Saram Road was dedicated and named, State Councillor / Parliamentary Secretary and Chairman of the Urban Council Simon Abeywickrama paid tribute to de Saram's integrity by stating that "the road, like the warden himself, was dead straight".

He was known to have boycotted the languages commission in protest about a single language policy and criticised the serving prime minister S. W. R. D. Bandaranaike for his stance on the matter in his wardens speech when the prime minister, himself a distinguished alumnus was the chief guest at the prize giving in 1958 where words attributed to him in this speech are:

"this is said to be the age of the common man. It May be so. But it is certainly also the age of the Demagogue, the man with the loud voice and fluent vocabulary and specious tongue who debases his gifts by devoting them to misrepresentation of facts, the stirring up of hatred, the vilifying of persons and causes to which he is opposed the man with much cleverness but little wisdom who is prepared to sacrifice the peace and prosperity of the country to the gaining of some petty personal or party triumph. Our time has been described as a period of transition. If it is not to be a period of breakdown we must bend our selves to put before our people values which are of permanent and abiding worth. The persons of whom I speak want to run the country on Slogans or what are vulgarly described as stunts."

He is reputed to have rescued a victim of a mob at considerable risk to himself in 1958.
