= 1989 Sri Lankan parliamentary election =

- 15 February 1989

All 225 seats in the Parliament of Sri Lanka 113 seats were needed for a majority
- Turnout: 63.60%
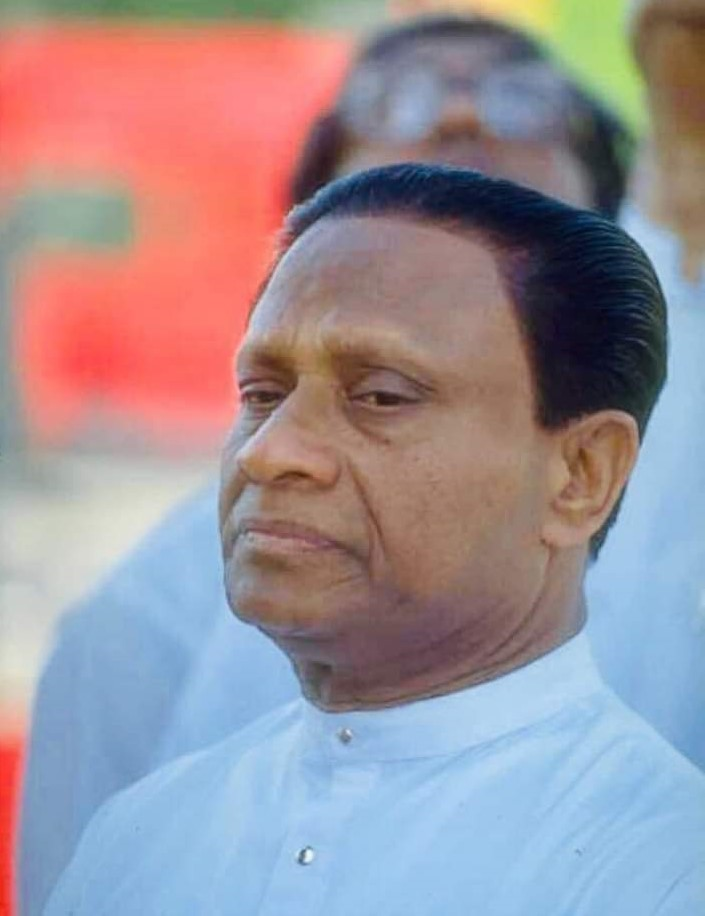

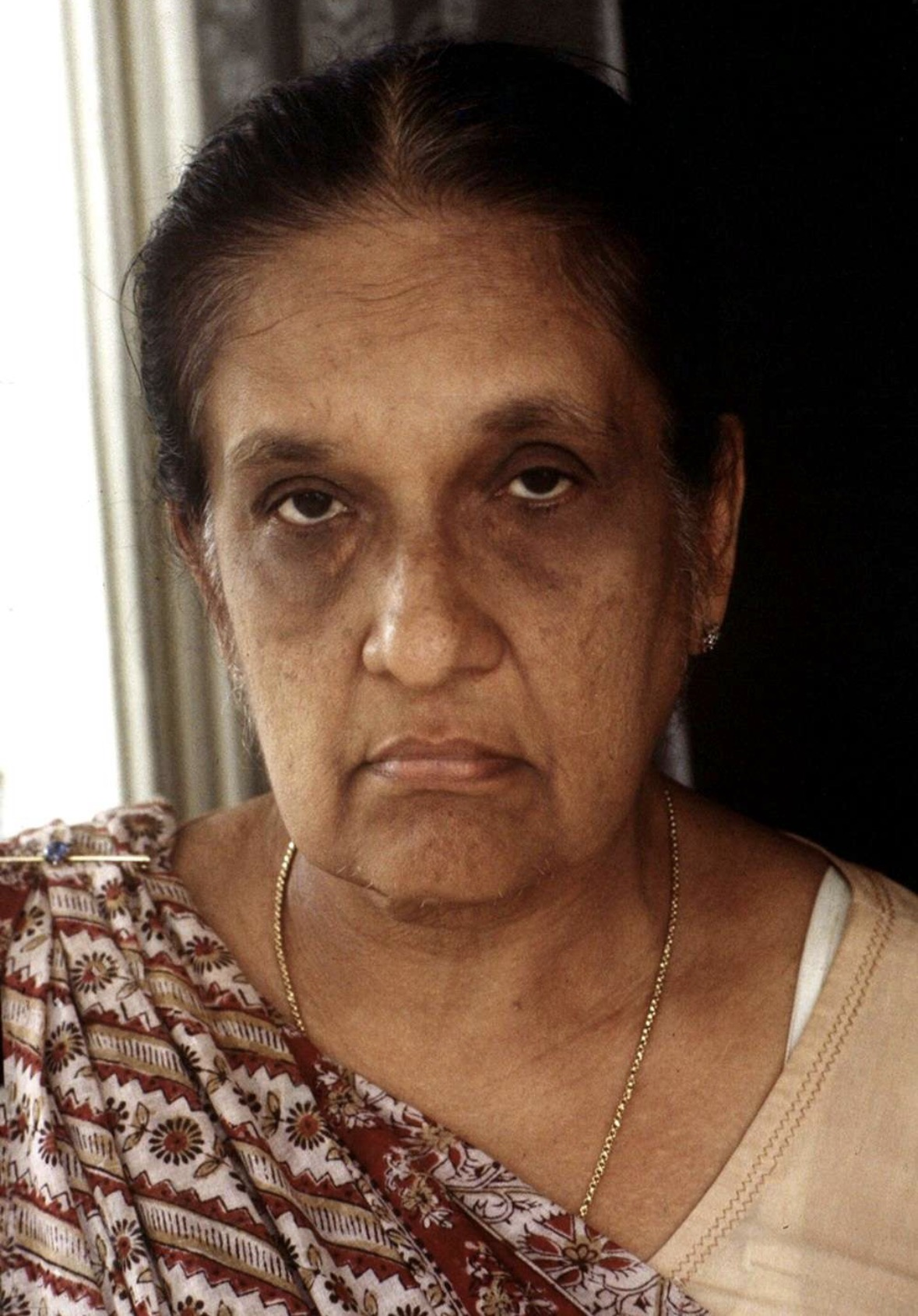
	First party	Second party
Leader	Ranasinghe Premadasa	Sirimavo Bandaranaike
Party	UNP	SLFP
Leader since	1988	1960
Leader's seat	n/a	Gampaha District
Last election	50.92%, 140 seats	29.72%, 8 seats
Seats won	125	67
Seat change	▼15	▲59
Popular vote	2,838,005	1,785,369
Percentage	50.71%	31.90%
Swing	▼0.21pp	▲2.18pp
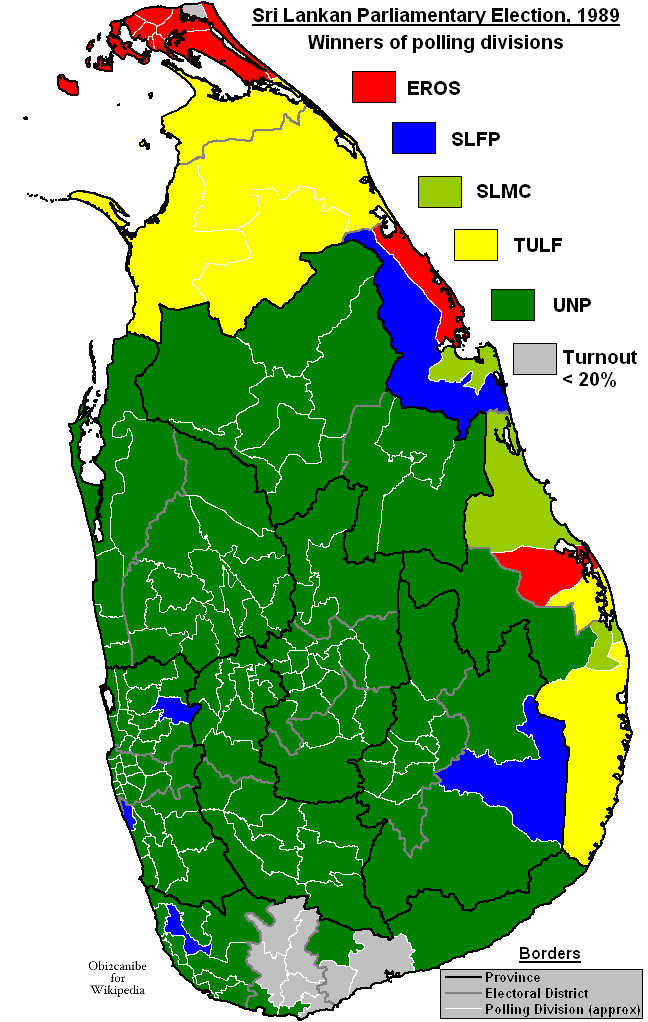
- Winners of electoral districts. UNP in green and SLFP in blue.
Prime Minister before election
Ranasinghe Premadasa
UNP
Prime Minister-designate
Dingiri Banda Wijetunga
UNP

Parliamentary elections were held in Sri Lanka on 15 February 1989, the first since 1977. The elections that should normally have been held by 1983 had been cancelled by the 1982 referendum.

== Results ==
Party	Votes	%	Seats		
Party	Votes	%	District	National	Total
United National Party (Note: Including the Ceylon Workers' Congress.)	2,838,005	50.71	110	15	125
Sri Lanka Freedom Party	1,785,369	31.90	58	9	67
Eelam Revolutionary Organisation of Students (Note: Contested as an independent group in Batticaloa, Jaffna, Trincomalee and Vanni.)	229,877	4.11	12	1	13
Sri Lanka Muslim Congress	202,016	3.61	3	1	4
Tamil United Liberation Front (Note: Consisting of the Eelam National Democratic Liberation Front, the Eelam People's Revolutionary Liberation Front, the Tamil Eelam Liberation Organization and the Tamil United Liberation Front.)	188,594	3.37	9	1	10
United Socialist Alliance (Note: Consisting of the Communist Party of Sri Lanka, the Lanka Sama Samaja Party, the Nava Sama Samaja Party and Sri Lanka Mahajana Pakshaya.)	160,271	2.86	2	1	3
Mahajana Eksath Peramuna	91,128	1.63	2	1	3
United Lanka People's Party	67,723	1.21	0	0	0
Democratic People's Liberation Front (Note: Including the People's Liberation Organisation of Tamil Eelam.)	18,502	0.33	0	0	0
All Ceylon Tamil Congress	7,610	0.14	0	0	0
Independents	7,373	0.13	0	0	0
Total	5,596,468	100.00	196	29	225
Valid votes	5,596,468	93.87			
Invalid/blank votes	365,563	6.13			
Total votes	5,962,031	100.00			
Registered voters/turnout	9,374,164	63.60			
Source: Election Commission
