= H. L. de Silva =

Sri Lankan lawyer and diplomat

Deshamanya Herman Leonard de Silva PC
- Born: 28 January 1928; Sri Lanka
- Died: 7 April 2009 (aged 81)
- Education: St Peter's College, Colombo; Nalanda College, Colombo
- Occupations: Lawyer, Diplomat

Deshamanya Herman Leonard de Silva, PC (28 January 1928 – 7 April 2009) was a Sri Lankan lawyer and diplomat. He was the former Permanent Representative of Sri Lanka to the United Nations (New York). He was a former President and honorary life member of the Bar Association of Sri Lanka.

== Education ==
De Silva was educated at St Peter's College, Colombo and Nalanda College Colombo. He subsequently entered the Faculty of Law at the University of Ceylon in 1948, graduated LLB in 1951, completed the Ceylon Law College examinations and qualified for the Bar in 1953.

== Professional life ==
After a period of working alongside Felix Dias Bandaranaike in the unofficial bar, he joined the Attorney General Department in 1955 as a Crown Counsel, a post he relinquished in 1970 to rejoin the unofficial Bar.

He was described as ""a master of the law, an eloquent speaker with the gift of presenting a case attractively, a good debater with a razor sharp intellect"" by Lakshman Kadirgamar and S. L. Gunasekara has classed him as one of the greats in Sri Lankan Law along with his close friend and contemporary in the Attorney General Department Elanga Wikramanayake.

He is best known for his work as an expert on Constitutional Law, being a member Government’s peace delegation at peace talks.

== Honours ==
De Silva was appointed a Senior Attorney (now referred to as Presidents Counsel after the 1978 Constitutional reform) by the President, admitted to the Roll of Honour of St. Peter’s College in 1984 and awarded the title ‘Vishva Prasadini (Nithiya)’ by the Government of Sri Lanka in 1997 in recognition of contributions to the advancement of the law and subsequently the title Deshamanya. The 2009 Bar Association Law Journal was dedicated to HL De Silva and the Bar Association awarded the Deshamanya H. L. De Silva Memorial award to the winner of a legal essay competition open to junior lawyers.

== See also ==
- Sri Lankan Non Career Diplomats
- Heads of missions from Sri Lanka
