= Athula Wikramanayake =

Sri Lankan-American developmental biologist and Professor

Athula H. Wikramanayake
- Occupations: Professor and Developmental Biologist

Athula H. Wikramanayake is a Sri Lankan American developmental biologist and Professor at the University of Miami.

== Early life and education ==
Wikramanayake was born in Colombo, Sri Lanka, and like his brothers Arittha R Wikramanayake and Eric Wikramanayake, father Elanga Wikramanayake, grandfather (Senator E. B. Wikramanayake, Minister of Justice) and great grandfather he was educated at S. Thomas' College, Mt Lavinia Sri Lanka. Wikramanayake represented the school in the first XV Rugby team coached by Quentin Israel which were National Champions in 1978.

He obtained a Ph.D. in Zoology from University of California, Davis, California, USA.

== Later life and career ==
He has worked as a Postdoctoral Fellow, Research Associate and Assistant Professor of Biochemistry and Molecular Biology at the Department of Biochemistry and Molecular Biology at the University of Texas' M.D. Anderson Cancer Center, and later went on to serve as an Assistant Professor of Zoology and then Associate Professor of Zoology at the University of Hawaii at Manoa. He is currently a Professor and Chair of the Department of Biology at The University of Miami at Coral Gables.

His research interests include the developmental biology of marine invertebrates and in particular the evolution of gastrulation. He has published widely in this area and has been the holder of grants from the National Science Foundation and the National Institutes of Health, with his overall grants totaling $1,384,620. Wikramanayake is also a guest speaker at conferences.

== Awards and honours ==
=== Awards ===
- National Academies Education Fellow in the Life Sciences, 2005-2006
- Outstanding Biology Educator, Department of Biology, University of Miami, 2012

=== Grants ===
- NIH 1R03HD068672-01A1. Regulators of Dishevelled Function in the Wnt Signaling Pathway. August 8, 2012 - July 31, 2014
- National Science Foundation. Evolution of embryonic polarity: The role of the Wnt signaling pathways. July 1, 2007- July 30, 2011
- National Science Foundation. Specification and patterning of the animal-vegetal axis. January 1, 2005 – December 31, 2008

== Bibliography ==
=== Selected academic works ===
- Kumburegama, S., Wijesena, N., Xu, X and Wikramanayake, A.H. (2011). Strabismus-mediated primary archenteron invagination is uncoupled from Wnt/beta-catenin-dependent endoderm cell fate specification in Nematostella vectensis (Anthozoa, Cnidaria): Implications for the evolution of gastrulation. EvoDevo 2:2 (Highly accessed; Evaluated by Faculty of 1000).
- Byrum, C.A., Xu, R, Bince, J, McClay, D.R., and Wikramanayake, A.H. (2009). Blocking Dishevelled signaling in the non-canonical Wnt pathway in sea urchins disrupts endoderm formation and spiculogenesis, but not secondary mesoderm formation. Dev. Dynamics 238, 1649-1665
- Lee, P., Kumburegama, S., Marlowe, H., Martindale, M.Q. and Wikramanayake, A.H. (2007). Asymmetric developmental potential along the animal-vegetal axis in the anthozoan cnidarian, Nematostella vectensis, is mediated by Disheveled. Dev. Biol. 310, 169-186.
- Wikramanayake, A.H., Hong, M., Lee, P.N., Pang, K., Byrum, C.A., Bince, J.M., Xu, R. and M.Q. Martindale. (2003). An ancient role for nuclear beta-catenin in the evolution of axial polarity and germ layer segregation. Nature 426, 446-450 (Evaluated by Faculty of 1000)
- Wessel, G.M. and A.H. Wikramanayake. (1999). How to grow a gut: Ontogeny of the endoderm in the sea urchin embryo. BioEssays, 21, 459-471.
- Wikramanayake, A.H., Huang, L. and W. H. Klein. (1998). beta-catenin is essential for patterning the maternally specified animal-vegetal axis in the sea urchin embryo. Proc. Natl. Acad. Sci. USA 95, 9343-9348.
