= D. S. Jayasekera =

Sri Lankan educator

D S Jayasekera
- Born: Sri Lanka
- Occupations: Head Master and School Teacher
- Known for: Promoting the Teaching of Sinhala, Sinhala Literature and Sinhala Drama

David S Jayasekera was a Head Master and Sinhala teacher at S. Thomas' College, Mt Lavinia.

Jayasekera was born in Dompe and educated at St. Joseph's College, Colombo. He completed S. S. C. and the London Matriculation Examination and entered the University of Colombo to gain a Diploma in Education. Jayasekara started his teaching career at St. Joseph's College moving to S Thomas' College in 1947.

Mr. Jayasekera's career at S. Thomas' College, Mt Lavinia lasted 48 years from 1947 to 1995. He taught Sinhala, Buddhism and History. As a Sinhala teacher he was a considered to have been at the forefront of the post independence renaissance in teaching of the Sinhala language and literary activities with the assistance of Arisen Ahubudu, Sandadas Coperehewa and GL Jinadasa.

He was master in charge of the Sinhala Literary Society, Music Society, the Sinhala Drama Society, the Sinhala Debating team and the General knowledge quiz team at S.Thomas' College. Members of the teams included Prof. A.P. De Silva, Dr. B.L.J. Mendis, N.M. Don Mohanlal, Prof. G. L. Peiris, H.K. Caldera, Rohan Perera, Palitha Kohona. He was also a patron of the Buddhist Society of the college. Gamini Fonseka was among those introduced to acting through stage plays produced by Mr. Jayasekera at S.Thomas' College. Marcandan in a letter to a newspaper refers to R. D. Gunaratne, Uthum Herat, Russell de Mel, Duleep Goonewardena and Devaka Fernando as students who would have made Mr Jayasekera proud He ran the school stationery store referred to as the 'book cupboard' which he ran with the assistance of students among whom were Kesaralal Gunasekara (later a member of parliament and deputy mayor of Dehiwala Mt Lavinia).

He was master in charge of De Saram House and later served as head master of the lower school. Rajiva Wijesinha comments on his efficiency as an administrator.
