= Sandadas Coperehewa =

Sri Lankan writer (1923–2022)

Sandadas Coperahewa
- Born: 23 January 1923; Matara, Sri Lanka
- Died: 5 June 2022 (aged 99)
- Other name: Chandradasa Coperahewa
- Education: St. Thomas' College, Matara
- Occupations: Writer, poet, scholar, artist, teacher, journalist
- Children: Prof. Sandagomi Coperahewa (Refer), Dr. Sanath Coperahewa
- Awards: Hela Basa Mini, Kala Bhushana, Detu Subesi, Godage Divaman Pranama

Sandadas Coperahewa (23 January 1923 – 5 June 2022) was a Sri Lankan Sinhala writer, poet, scholar, art critic, teacher and journalist.

== Life and career ==
Coperahewa was born in Pamburana, Matara on 23 January 1923. He was educated at Pamburana Sariyuth College, then attended St. Thomas' College, Matara from age 9. In 1951, the ‘centenary year’ of the College, Sandadas Coperahewa joined S. Thomas’ College at the invitation of his old friend, Pinto-Jayawardana. He was recruited by Warden R. S. de Saram and taught Sinhala, Art and Buddhism for thirty two years (1951–1983) at S. Thomas' College, Mt Lavinia alongside Arisen Ahubudu, GL Jinadasa and D.S. Jayasekera.During the 1950s and 1960s, Hela teachers and students popularised the use of pure Sinhala terms over other commonly used Sinhala expressions.

Coperahewa contributed poems to Subasa, a journal started by Munidasa Cumaratunga in 1941, and became an active member of the Hela Havula organization. He was deputy leader of the Hela Havula, an editor of the Pali Dictionary published by "Siri Vajiranana Bhikku Center Maharagama" and Editorial Consultant of Little Star Children's weekly and Lankadeepa. He wrote columns on issues of Art, Buddhism, Sinhala Language and Literature in the English broadsheets, and translated Prof R.H.Wilenskis Miniature History of European Art to Sinhala (යුරෝපා කලාවේ ලුහුඬු ඉතිහාසය හා යුරෝපා කලා හෙළ කලා සසඳුව Colombo: M.D. Gunasena, 1958). He also wrote a commentary to Sinhala poem Daham Gaeta Mala Vivaranaya ( දහම් ගැට මාලා විවරණය).

Sandadas Coperahewa died peacefully on 5 June 2022, at the age of 99.His eldest son, Sandagomi Coperahewa, is a Senior Professor (Chair) in the Department of Sinhala at the University of Colombo.

== Honours ==
The "Hela Havula Movement" awarded him the title "Hela Bas Mini" 1993 in recognition of his services to Sinhala Language and the Department of Cultural Affairs awarded him the title the "Kala-Bhushana" in 2003 and "Divaman Pranama" by Godage Literary Festival in 2015 in recognition of his services to Art, Literature and Sinhala language.
