= Chethika Gunasiri =

Sri Lankan researcher and environmental scientist

- Born: Chethika Gunasiri
- Education: University of Sri Jayewardenepura; University of Colombo; United Nations University; Chinese Culture University
- Scientific career
- Fields: Environmental science, Sustainability Science, Earth Science, Zoology
- Institutions: Sri Lanka Land Development Corporation

Chethika Gunasiri is a Sri Lankan environmental scientist and researcher. She is well known for her sustainability related efforts especially related to Colombo Wetland Management Strategy. She has often spoken about the importance of wetlands for a sustainable Colombo and she has raised awareness among public about the critical role played by wetlands for the sustainability and to attain sustainable urban future.

== Career ==
She completed her Ph.D. in the field of Sustainability Science at the United Nations University in Japan. She also pursued her Master's degree in Science in the field of Earth Science from the Chinese Culture University in Taiwan. She also completed her MBA from the University of Sri Jayewardenepura and also obtained her Bachelor's degree in Zoology from the University of Colombo.

She also currently serving as an environmental scientist at the Sri Lanka Land Development Corporation. She also prominently works to address concerns related to restoration, management and wise use of urban wetlands to comply with sustainable city development. She has attained over a decade of experience in the field of urban ecosystem management. She was also instrumental by pioneering as an expert in preparing the Colombo Wetland Management Strategy and the application for the Ramsar Wetland City Accreditation for Colombo City.

She also served in various other capacities including South Asia Regional Representative of the Wetland Link International-Asia Steering Committee, member of the Institute of Environmental Professionals Sri Lanka (IEPSL), and as an Assistant Secretary and a council member of the same organisation.

She was invited as a guest speaker in January 2023 to deliver Wildlife and Nature Protection Society (WNPS) lecture under the theme of "Living in the only wetland capital in the world" at the Bandaranaike Memorial International Conference Hall.
