= Uthum Herat =

Dr. Amal Uthum Herat
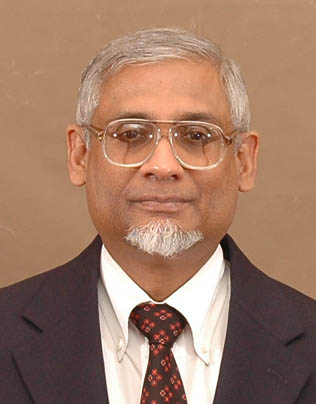

Deputy Governor Central Bank of Sri Lanka
- In office 27 May 2009 – 23 October 2009
- Preceded by: Ranee Jayamaha
- Succeeded by: Priyantha Fernando

Alternate Executive Director International Monetary Fund

Personal details
- Born: 15 September 1957
- Died: 23 October 2009 (aged 52)
- Education: S. Thomas' Preparatory School, Kollupitiya, S. Thomas' College, Mt. Lavinia, University of Sri Jayawardenapura, Purdue University
- Profession: Economist

Amal Uthum Herat (15 September 1957 – 23 October 2009) born in Colombo, Sri Lanka was Deputy Governor of the Central Bank of Sri Lanka and Alternate Executive Director of the International Monetary Fund.

== School education ==
Uthum Herat received his early education at St. Thomas' Preparatory School in Kollupitiya and St Thomas' College, Mt. Lavinia. He was a school prefect a member of the English Debating and Drama Societies, (with Chanaka Amaratunga, RD Gunaratne and Richard de Zoysa), a member of the Classical Quiz competition team which won the National competition (with Rohan Edirisinghe, Richard de Zoysa, RD Gunaratne, Chanaka Amaratunga and Devaka Fernando) a member of the Science Quiz team which reached the semi-finals of the national competition (with RD Gunaratne Professor Chandu de Silva and Devaka Fernando). He was a committee member of the English Drama Society, represented the college in Chess, was secretary of the Chess Club and was awarded colours in Chess in 1975. other classmates included Russell de Mel and Duleep Goonewardena . His teachers included D.S. Jayasekera, ECK Abayasekera and Duleep De Chickera. Ivan Corea recollects Hearts contributions as a member of the Student Christian Movement. Herat was awarded the Bishop's Senior Divinity Prize and the HL Wendt Memorial Scholarship and served as Secretary of the Student Christian Movement.

== University education ==
Herat entered the university of Jaffna but transferred to the University of Sri Jayawardenapura and was awarded a BSc degree with first class honours by the University of Sri Jayawardenapura. He was later awarded MSc and PhD from Purdue University in the United States.

== Career with the Central Bank of Sri Lanka ==
Herat was one of Sri Lanka's leading figures in the world of banking. Having served the Central Bank of Sri Lanka with distinction for 26 years he was appointed Deputy Governor, the highest office for a career central banker in Sri Lanka, on 27 May 2009.

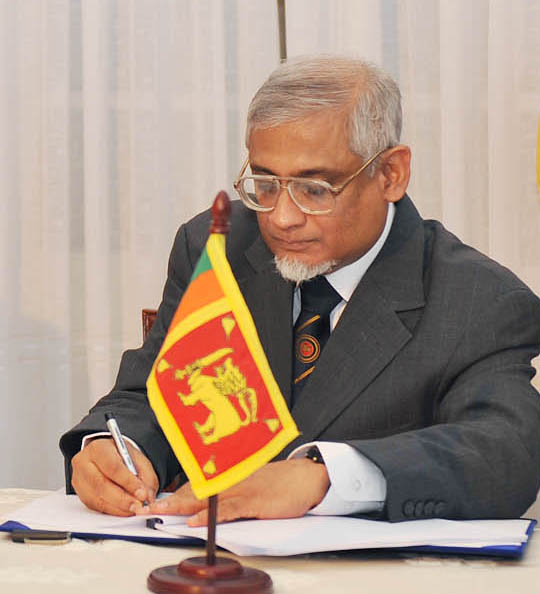
Dr. Uthum Herat Deputy Governor of the Central Bank of Sri Lanka signing official documents.

As Deputy Governor, Herat was in charge of financial system stability, and chaired the Financial Stability Committee, and also served on many key committees within the Central Bank including the Monetary Policy Committee and Foreign Exchange Management Committee. He was also the ex-officio Chairman of the Credit Information Bureau of Sri Lanka and the National Payment Council.

Prior to his appointment as Deputy Governor, Herat worked in the Statistics Department, and the Economic Research Department. While in Economic Research Department, he served as the Head of International Finance, Head of Money and Banking, deputy director, Additional Director, and as Director of Economic Research. In 2004, Herat was released to the International Monetary Fund to serve as Alternate Executive Director for Bangladesh, Bhutan, India, and Sri Lanka. Upon his return to the Bank in 2007, Herat assumed office as Assistant Governor in charge of Bank Supervision Department, Supervision of Non-Bank Financial Institutions Department, Financial Stability Departments and several operational departments within the Central Bank of Sri Lanka.

Dr. Herat was also the Chairman of the Institute of Bankers of Sri Lanka (IBSL) since July 2009.

== Author ==
Uthum Herat was an author on financial matters writing for both national and international magazines and newspapers - in the areas of monetary policy, foreign exchange market, financial sector reforms, money laundering, Central Bank independence, economic growth, exchange rate, financial market deployment, unemployment and savings and investments.

He was an educator, sharing his expertise with university students in Sri Lanka - Dr. Herat was a visiting lecturer at the University of Colombo and the University of Moratuwa in Sri Lanka, South East Asian Central Banks Research and Training Centre (SEACEN) in Kuala Lumpur, Malaysia, and the Institute of Chartered Accountants of Sri Lanka. He was also an Associate Member of the Chartered Institute of Management Accountants in the United Kingdom.

== Lay preacher ==
Herat was a committed Christian and a man of faith. He was a Lay Preacher at the Methodist Church in Mount Lavinia. Church life was an integral part of Dr Herat, over the years he had led the Youth Fellowship, he was also General Superintendent of the Sunday School. In April 1974 he represented St.Thomas' College, Mount Lavinia in a dramatised act of Easter Worship, ' Breakdown and Breakthrough,' directed by Gillian Todd and held at the Anglican Cathedral of Christ the Living Saviour, in Colombo.

== Death ==
At the age of 52, having been hospitalized after a stroke, Uthum Herat died on 23 October 2009 at a private hospital in Colombo. He is remembered not only for his service as a central banker but also for his charitable work in Sri Lanka.

== See also ==
- List of S. Thomas' College alumni
- List of Purdue University alumni
- Dehiwala-Mount Lavinia
