= Arisen Ahubudu =

Sri Lankan author, poet and scholar

- Born: 18 March 1920; Sri Lanka, Galle
- Died: 26 May 2011 (aged 91); Colombo, Sri Lanka
- Other name: Ariyasena Asuboda
- Occupations: writer, orator, scholar, playwright, teacher (Guru), Sinhala lyricist, author and poet in Sri Lanka
- Spouse: Sanda Ahubudu (1953-2011)
- Children: Sanda Samanthi And Demintha (son)
- Website: www.ahubudu.lk

Kalasuri Arisen Ahubudu (Sinhala: අරීසෙන් අහුබුදු; 18 March 1920 – 26 May 2011) was a Sri Lankan writer, orator, scholar, playwright, teacher (Guru), Sinhala lyricist, author and poet. He is a member of the Hela Havula. He has received three government awards for literary works, the title of Kalasuri from the Government of Sri Lanka, and the Sarasaviya Awards film award for best composer. As a composer, he is especially noted for writing music performed by W.D. Amaradeva, such as Gilem Obe Guna.

== Early life and education ==
He was born on 18 March 1920 in Mudiyallagahawatta in Malalaga, Koggala, Sri Lanka.

Ahubudu was the second of the three children of the family of Devundara Devamanimendra Heronis De Silva and Wathugedara Laisohami. The child was named as Ariyasena Arsuboda by parents, which he later converted to fairly pure Sinhala name Arisen Ahubudu. He married Sanda Ahubudu on 8 August 1953 and they have one daughter Sanda Samathi Ahubudu.

In 1937, at the age of 17, he first involved as a teacher in Piyadigama Saripuththa College, Ahangama. Kumaratunga Munidasa gave an honorary to him as "Subas Pathin Kiwithi", due to excellent poetry he possess.

== Academic career ==
Ahubudu served 42 years as a teacher, beginning his career at Holy Trinity College in Nuwara Eliya, then he moved to Mahinda College, Galle and later to Maha Bodhi College, Maradana. His longest stint came even later at S. Thomas' College, Mount Lavinia 29 years from 1952 until 1979 where he was among those recruited by Warden R. S. de Saram and who, together with Sandadas Coperehewa and G. L. Jinadasa supported by D. S. Jayasekera, was a leader in the post independence renaissance in teaching of the Sinhala language and literary activities. He taught briefly at Kibiya Government College, Katugastota and Deegala Buddhist College, Katugastota as well.

While on teaching, in 1947 he published a magazine called Ediya (means "power") for children. the motto of that magazine was "Ediya produced for improving powers of children". He strongly believed that Sinhalese people originated from King Ravana, and not from King Vijaya. Which is disproven by Genetic, Linguistic and Historical evidence.

Prior to his death Arisen Ahubudu was the last surviving prominent member of Hela Havula as well as the last surviving prominent Sri Lankan lyricist. Some of the popular songs that he lyrics are Kate Kiri Suwanda, Rena Gira Rena Ambe, Pruthugeese Kaaraya, Punsada Eliyay, Sudata Sude Walakulai, Rejina Mamai Ape Rajje, and Ko Hathuro, Lanka Lanka Pembara Lanka, Dakuna Nagenahira, Mal Gomu Gumu.

1946, he entered to the drama script writing and wrote very famous dramas at that time, such as Wanaraja Kumariya, Hela hethiriya, Sakwithi Ravana, and Lokanthaya saha geta.

Ahubudu was found deceased of old age on 26 May 2011.

== Some of his works ==
- Gilem Obe Guna by W. D. Amaradeva
- Aduwa
- Hadiya
- Kumaratungu De Elma
- Kumaratungu Esura
- Sinhala Wansa Kathawa
- Ran Kirula
- Arutha Nirutha
- Maha Pava Dime Jathakaya
- Ena Kape Bana Katha
- Kalata Pipena Mal
- Hela Derana Vaga
- Koggala Pavata
- Mangala Kinkini
- Dam Rasa Dahara
- Asammataya Raja Vima
- Arisen Ahubudu Harasaraniya
- Sakviti Ravana
- Lanka Gam Nam Vahara
- Atu Aga Dili Vana Mal
- Nuthana Jathaka
- Hela Awuruda Vaga
- Samana Asna
- Ira Handa Negi Rata
- Manu Wasa

== Posts held ==
- 1979 – He acted as editor of Sinhala Dictionary at Sinhala Dictionary Office. He served 5 years on that post.
- 1979 – Editor of Part I and II of Sinhala edition of Mahavansaya.
- 1985 – Presidential Language Consultant.
- 1989 – Sri Lanka Representative for Asian Poet Conference held at Bangladesh.
- Panadura Royal College school song mading " sip satha pana panadure"

== Awards and honours ==
- 1962 Rajya Sahithya Sammanaya – for Pareviya sama asna
- 1969 Year's best poetry – for Rasa Dahara
- 1980 Sarasaviya Awards for best lyrics – for song Kaurudo kaurudo dan lokko of the film Hadaya
- 1984 Kala Suri Award – for acting as a remarkable lyricist in Sri Lanka
- 1985 Kiwisuru Award by Hela Urumaya
- 1988 First Class Kala Suri Award
- 1990 Hela Bas Mini Award
