= Chanaka Amaratunga =

Sri Lankan politician

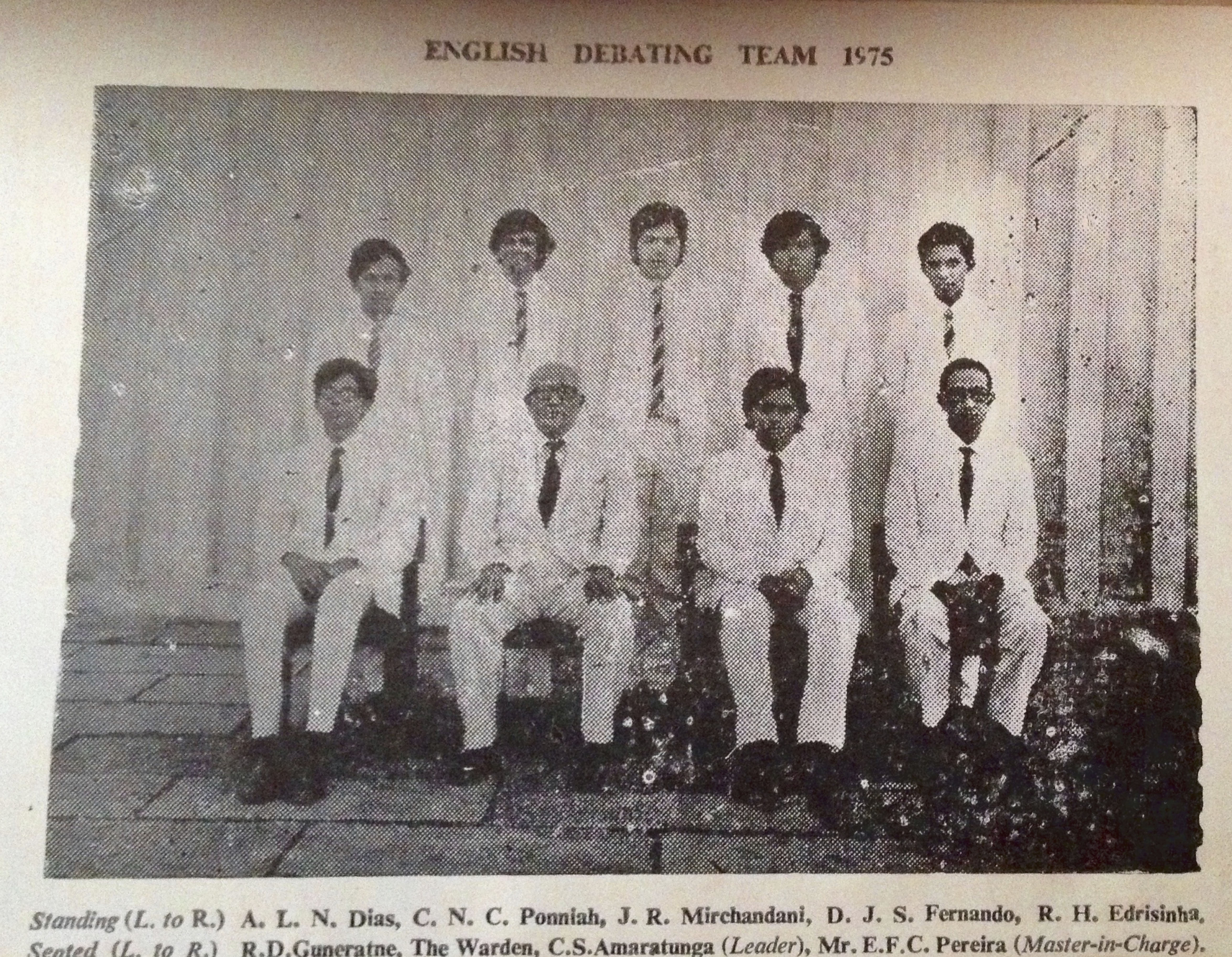
- Born: 19 April 1958
- Died: 1 August 1996 (aged 38)
- Education: St Thomas' College, University College, Oxford, University of London
- Known for: Founding the Liberal Party of Sri Lanka
- Political party: Liberal

Chanaka Amaratunga (19 April 1958 – 1 August 1996) was the founder of the Liberal Party of Sri Lanka.

== Early life ==
Schooled at S. Thomas' College, Mount Lavinia where he was a prominent member of the Debating, Drama and Parliamentary societies. Contemporaries included Richard de Zoysa Rohan Edirisinghe, Uthum Herat and R. D. Gunaratne.

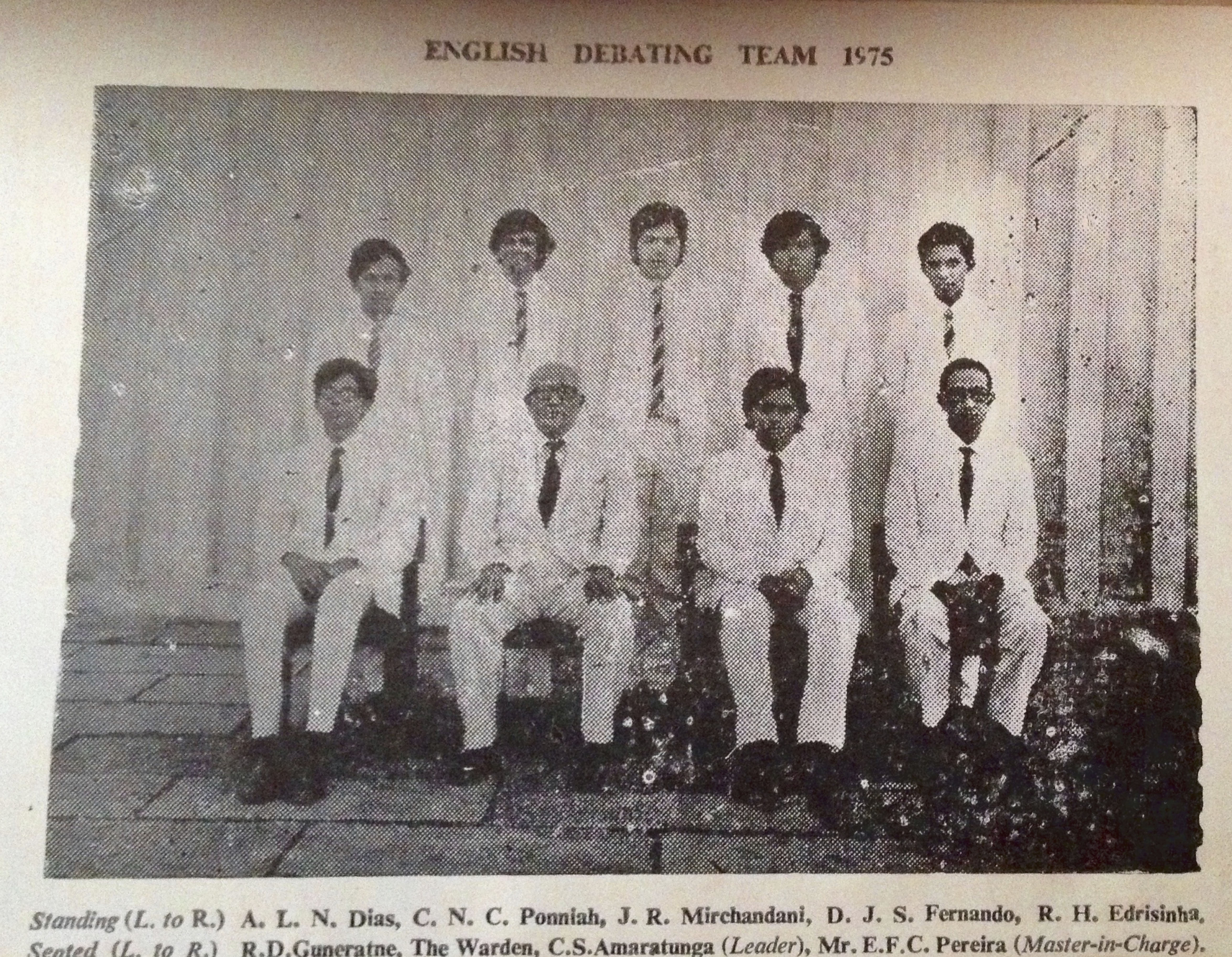
S Thomas College Mt Lavinia English Debating Team 1975 Chanaka Amaratunga with Warden SJ Anandanayagam, Mr EFC Pereira, Rohan Edirisinghe, R. D. Gunaratne, Christopher Ponniah, ALN Dias, JR Mirchandani and Devaka Fernando (absent for photograph CS Pullenayagam, Richard de Zoysa)

Amaratunga went on to read Politics, Philosophy and Economics at University College, Oxford, and was secretary of the Oxford Union. He obtained a doctorate from the University of London for a thesis on Iranian relations with the West in the 1950s.

He was interested in politics from his schooldays, and a firm adherent of the United National Party (UNP), the more conservative of the two main Sri Lankan parties. He welcomed its overwhelming victory at the 1977 elections, and its reversal, under Junius Richard Jayewardene, of the statist economic policies of the past.

== Political career ==
During the early 1980s, Amaratunga believed that Jayewardene was moving towards authoritarianism, and that the open economy he promoted was not sustained by any political philosophy. Amaratunga established the Council for Liberal Democracy, which was intended to develop a conceptual framework for the reforms which he believed should be taken further.

Amaratunga broke conclusively with Jayewardene's UNP when it pushed through a referendum in 1982 to postpone parliamentary elections for six years. Apart from the damage to democracy, the measure as Amaratunga predicted led to opposition going underground, and to severe terrorist activity throughout the country in the late eighties. Though Jayewardene's successor, Ranasinghe Premadasa, managed to restore order in the south after elections were held, the resentment that had peaked in the north has contributed to continuing conflict with the Tamil Tigers.

In 1987, Amaratunga established the Liberal Party of Sri Lanka. The party supported the main opposition candidate for the presidency in 1988. Premadasa began a programme of reforms that brought the country closer to principles Amaratunga had enunciated, in particular a competitive open economy that did not depend on state patronage, an independent judiciary, and regular free elections. Premadasa for his part wooed Amaratunga and had signed a pact with the Liberal Party just before he was assassinated in 1993. Premadasa's successor kept Amaratunga at arm's length, but when he lost the next election Gamini Dissanayake, who took over the leadership of the UNP, in fact got Amaratunga to draft his manifesto for the presidential election of 1994.

Dissanayake was also assassinated by the Tigers and though his widow contested the presidency on the manifesto drafted by Amaratunga, his successor as Leader of the Party, who was cast more in the Jayewardene mould, repudiated those principles. The government that had taken over did request Amaratunga's assistance for promotion of its own peace package in the period between 1995 and 1996, but this was not on any formal basis. Amaratunga died in a car crash on 1 August 1996.

== Writings and interest in the arts ==
Amaratunga crystallised his theories in 'Ideas for Constitutional Reform', based on a seminar series the CLD conducted between 1987 and 1989. Typically, for one who believed in free speech, he included papers by politicians and social commentators representing the whole range of the political spectrum, from the old Trotskyists to modern libertarians.

Apart from his interest in politics, Amaratunga was keenly interested in the arts. In the Liberal Review, which he edited along with Rajiva Wijesinha for a decade, there were regular columns on the arts and several reviews that he wrote himself. He was also an accomplished actor, as well as being a debater, and had been Secretary and Treasurer of the Oxford Union.

== Primary source ==
Rajiva Wijesinha, MA, DPhil (Oxon), Senior Professor of Languages, Sabaragamuwa University & former President, Liberal Party of Sri Lanka
