= Wildlife and Nature Protection Society =

Conservation organization

- Abbreviation: WNPS
- Formation: 23 May 1894; 132 years ago
- Type: Non governmental organization
- Purpose: Wildlife Conservation, Environmental conservation, Youth engagement
- Location: Sri Lanka
- Methods: Awareness, Advocacy, Litigation, Lobbying, Research
- Website: wnpssl.org/
- Formerly called: Ceylon Game Protection Society; Ceylon Game and Fauna Protection Society; Wildlife Protection Society of Ceylon

Wildlife and Nature Protection Society is a conservation organisation. It is the third oldest non-governmental conservation organisation in the world and was instrumental in setting up Wilpattu National Park and Yala National Park.

== History ==
The Ceylon Game Protection Society was formed on 23 May 1894 at a meeting of 26 British hunting enthusiasts (including Sir Wilbraham Lennox, Rear Admiral William Robert Kennedy, Reginald Beauchamp Downall, C. Fisher and C. LeMesurier), organised by Captain E. Gordon Reeves, at the Bristol Hotel, Colombo. Kennedy was appointed honorary president and R. W. Levers, the Government Agent of the North Central Province, as the first chairman with Reeves as honorary secretary of the society. The society's main concerns were to stop or reduce the commercial hunting of game as it was dramatically impacting on their enjoyment as sports hunters. The society's first success was the passing of legislation prohibiting the export of hides and horns and the trade in these commodities and trade in dried meat. In 1898, through the society's efforts, the Yala Sanctuary on the southeast coast of Ceylon was gazetted and the fauna of the Yala Sanctuary were granted protection from hunting.

A second sanctuary, Wilpattu, was established on the northwest coast in 1905. In 1930, the society was renamed the Ceylon Game and Fauna Protection Society, reflecting its broader interests in conservation. In February 1938 both Yala and Wilpattu were formally declared national parks. In 1955, it became the Wildlife Protection Society of Ceylon and in 1970 the Wildlife and Nature Protection Society.

The society was instrumental in setting up the Department of Wildlife Conservation, which is the government body that maintains National Parks and recently initiated the country's first-ever Life Insurance Policy for the department's employees.

=== Advocacy and outreach ===
The Wildlife and Nature Protection Society conducts monthly lectures on conservation issues by inviting expert speakers, advocates for Environmental Impact Assessments to be carried out in the coastal zone for proposed development projects, advocates against the boar meat trade, ensures environmental standards and park policy of National Parks, conducts projects towards elephant conservation, condemns the use of elephants in festivals, and maintains a 'youth wing' which aims to raise awareness on environmental conservation among school children.

=== Conservation ===
The society works towards human-elephant co-existence by clearing elephant corridors of illegal settlements, initiating strategic electric fencing methods, identifying mitigation methods using flash lights to repel elephants, ensuring the welfare of the local communities and raising public awareness. Leopard conservation is carried out by training programmes and facilitating research. Marine conservation work involves identifying and protecting ship wrecks and conservation of thresher sharks.

=== Legal and policy ===
The Wildlife and Nature Protection Society, along with Environmental Foundation Limited and others, have litigated to protect National Parks from illegal clearing and entrance and biofuel projects.

== See also ==
- Department of Wildlife Conservation
- Environmental Foundation Limited
