= Peter Selvaratnam =

Australian musculoskeletal physiotherapist

Peter Selvaratnam is an Australian musculoskeletal physiotherapist, academic, and researcher. He is recognised for his contributions to medical research, and physiotherapy practice, particularly in the areas of musculoskeletal physiotherapy, pain management, and professional development.

== Career ==
Peter Selvaratnam is a Doctor of Medical Anatomy and a Specialist Musculoskeletal Physiotherapist, awarded by the Australian College of Physiotherapists in 2007. He is an Associate Clinical Professor at the University of Melbourne and has held visiting lecturer positions at La Trobe University and Monash University.

His clinical practice focuses on complex conditions involving the spine, neck, headaches, migraines, temporomandibular joint (TMJ) dysfunction, tinnitus, and hyperacusis. He is known for providing second opinions and is sought after for his expertise.

Selvaratnam has a distinguished career in research. He has published extensively on topics related to the spine, referred pain, headaches, and the relationship between the neck, jaw, and headaches. His research also encompasses sports physiotherapy and post-surgical pain management.

=== Honours and awards ===
In recognition of his outstanding contributions, Selvaratnam was awarded the Member of the Order of Australia (AM) in 2021. This honour acknowledges his dedication to physiotherapy, research, professional development, and humanitarian work.

== Legacies ==
Selvaratnam has worked as an examiner for specialist physiotherapy candidates and provides medico-legal opinions. He has been instrumental in developing and delivering educational programs, including the Australian Physiotherapy Association (APA) Dry Needling programme since 2004 and The University of Melbourne dry needling programme for the clinical doctorate and Masters programme. Furthermore, Selvaratnam is an active member of the Old Boys Association St. Thomas College, and St John's College.

Selvaratnam is an author and co-editor of several physiotherapy textbooks, including "Headache, Orofacial Pain and Bruxism: Multidisciplinary Approach to Diagnosis and Management" and "Sports Physiotherapy."

Dr. Doug Cary, a specialist physiotherapist from Australia, conducted a podcast interview for SBS radio with Selvaratnam. The topic of the interview was the presentation of the Order of Australia.

=== Dry Needling Course ===
Selvaratnam FACP and Jane Rooney FACP conducted a three-part course designed for physiotherapists, the Dry Needling course aimed to equip participants with the necessary knowledge and skills to practice dry needling safely and effectively.

=== The University of Melbourne and La Trobe community ===
The University of Melbourne Vice-Chancellor, and La Trobe University Vice-Chancellor Professor John Dewar AO expressed their enthusiasm in honouring the exceptional individuals from the University of Melbourne and La Trobe community whose remarkable accomplishments were acknowledged in the Australia Day Honours.
