= Lakdhas Wikkrama Sinha =

Lakdasa Wikkramasinha (Sinhala: ලක්දාස වික්‍රමසිංහ; 1941–1978) was a Sri Lankan poet who wrote in English and Sinhala, and is known for his fusion of the two languages.

== Early life and education ==
Wikkramasinha was educated at St Thomas' College, Mount Lavinia, Sri Lanka, where he studied law.

== Career ==
Wikkramasinha became an English teacher. His interest in Sinhala literature led him to experiment with methods of fusing Western and South Asian traditions in his writing.

Wikkrama Sinha's first book of verse, Lustre: Poems (Kandy, 1965), was written entirely in English. Feeling constrained by his education to write in the language of what he believed to be 'the most despicable people on earth', he set himself to write as anarchically as possible. His later work, however, did not reflect this mood.

Wikkramasinha's work appeared in Madrona, Eastern Horizon, New Ceylon Writing, Outposts, University of Chicago Review, and other local and international journals, and was published privately by him in Janakiharana and Other Poems (1967), Fifteen Poems (1970-both Kandy), and Nossa Senhora dos Chingalas (1973), O Regal Blood (1975), and The Grasshopper Gleaming (1976 —all Colombo).

In honour of a Sri Lankan artist of a previous generation, Wikkramasinha edited and privately published Twelve Poems to Justin Daraniyagala 1903 –67 (Kandy, 1971).

Wikkramasinha died by drowning at age 36.

== Work & Legacy ==
Wickkramasingha develops a revolutionary conception of the poet in works such as "The Poet". Here the role of the poet is markedly different from the conventional role of the poet as lyric commentator. For Wickkramasingha, the poet can be seen as a type of terrorist, an activist who purifies, changes, and restructures society.

In 'The Poet' Wickkramasingha uses metaphorical images to evoke this transformed role. First we see the poet as a terrorist 'tossing a bomb into the crowd,' where 'crowd' may refer to a busy public place. Next Wickkramasingha invokes the image of a soldier mounting a gun on a tripod, most probably for a grenade attack. The gun metamorphoses into a camera that levels and adjusts 'for a clear sight' of a speaker addressing a public meeting. In the second stanza, the narrator elaborates another function of the poet, comparing it to a hidden assassin, waiting with his rifle till the right moment comes. These varied settings suggest the range of activities undertaken by the poet.

Continuing with the motif of terrorism, Wickkramasingha figures the role of the poet as that of a guerilla preparing for a jungle ambush. At the end of the poem, the role of the poet becomes more revolutionary still, compared with the presence of a bomb in the city. This image suggests the uncontrollable and explosive feelings of the poet. He is on alert, taking up the task of a suicide bomber.

Through these images Wickkramasingha overturns the traditional conception of the poet, seen as a commentator or bystander; instead, his involvement in society is not limited to ideological support but includes active participation. A poet can be dangerous in his passion and can make a difference in society, while creating new attitudes and perspectives.

Wikkramasinha is highly conscious of his worth as a poet. In "The Poet", he articulates his credo concerning violence under the assumption that the poet is a rebel equipped with social and political consciousness:

The poet is the bomb in the city,
Unable to bear the circle of the
Seconds in his heart,
Waiting to burst.

A bilingual poet who wrote both in Sinhala and English, Wikkramasinha's adeptness in each established him as unique among Sri Lankan English poets. His best-known poems illustrate the distinctive linguistic features of his work, as in "The Cobra":

Your great hood was like a flag
Hung up there
In the village.
Endlessly the people came to Weragoda –
Watched you (your eyes like braziers),
Standing somewhat afar.
They stood before you in obeisance. Death,
The powers of the paramitas, took you to heaven however.
The sky, vertical, is where you are now
Shadowing the sun, curling round and round in my mind.
They whisper death-stories
But it was only my woman Dunkiriniya,
The very lamp of my heart,
That died.

Another poem, "From the life of the folk poet Ysinno," draws on feudal relations to illustrate the inspirational sources of poetry:

Ysinno cut the bamboo near Hanikette,
And from those wattles made his hut
And had nothing to cover it with, nothing
Like a hundred and sixty
Bales of straw.
So he made his way to the Walauwa at Iddamalgoda
And to the Menike said how poor he was,
And how from his twenties he had made those lines of song
Swearing before her all his fealties.
So she said, wait for the yala
Harvest and take the straw.
Ysinno said, O the rains are coming near,
My woman fretting, her kid will get wet.
Then the Menike said, O then
You take what straw you need from the behind shed.
And Ysinno, being a folk-poet, and his lines being not all dead,
The benison of the Menike of Iddamalgoda
Lives even today.

In "From the life of the folk poet Ysinno," written in the form of a folk ballad, Wikkramasinha draws on the resources of the Sinhalese vernacular. From Sinhala he takes nouns and adjectives such as Menike of Iddamalgoda, Ysinno, Walauwa and the yala harvest ('Menike' is used in certain areas of Sri Lanka to refer to the lady of the house and her daughters). Expressions such as "O the rains are coming near" (pluralization of rain) and "my woman fretting" (lack of copula) are direct translations from Sinhala turns of phrase. Even the phrase "from the behind shed" is a direct translation from local idiom; the substitution of the word "behind" for "back" is a Sri Lankan expression. The injunction "you take what straw you need", the retention of the second person subject as well as the particular collocation "what straw," which substitutes the possible terms "whatever" or "the," are essentially Sri Lankan. Thiru Kandiah points out that even the rhythmic quality of the expression of "O", in "O the rains are coming near", plays a significant role in creating characteristically Lankan effects. Suresh Canagarajah claims that Wikkramasinha's "nativization" of the English language idiom is radical; extending beyond the use of Sinhala nouns and adjectives, it encompasses native rhythms, which the dialogue between Ysinno and Menike evokes.

The arrangement of the lines and the choice of syntactic structures effectively evoke the pleading, anxious tone of Ysinno and the passive authority of Menike. The inversion of the word order in "and from these wattles made his hut", and "to the Menike said how poor he was", is a distinctive feature of Sri Lankan English. In this way, Wikkramasinha's handling of the English language in order to express his thoughts and feelings is able to reach a native readership.

Wikkramasinha is native in his poetry in subject matter, style, and language. He uses the English language as an expressive medium to convey the local flavor and idiom by incorporating Sri Lankan imagery. He is an "original" Sri Lankan poet, as he has successfully employed the English language to capture what is particular to Sri Lankan experience. His language depicts the rural areas in Sri Lanka and invites readers to envision a homely background.

Since his death, a number of books have been written about Wikkramasinha's life and work. These include "Love, Sex and Marriage in the Poetry of Lakdasa Wikkramasinha" by Lilani Jayatilaka and "New Trends in the Language of Sinhala Poetry" by U. P. Meddegama.

== Bibliography ==
=== Books by Lakdasa Wikkramasinha ===
- Lustre: Poems. Kandy: Ariya, 1965.
- Janakiharana and Other Poems. Kandy: 1967.
- Fifteen Poems. Kandy: 1970.
- Nossa Senhora dos Chingalas. Colombo: 1973.
- O Regal Blood. Colombo: 1975.
- The Grasshopper Gleaming. Colombo: 1976.
- Aurudu Mangala Davasa. Colombo: ?.

=== Works by Lakdasa Wikkramasinha in Periodicals ===
- 'A Straw Pillow' 'Red, the Coconuts' 'The Death of Ashanti' 'Verses' 'Visiting an Aunt' in Navasilu II 33-7.
- 'Birds,' 'From the Life of the Folk Poet Ysinno,' 'In Ancient Kotmale,' 'Poem—Tribe' 'The Muse' 'The Poet-I' 'The Poet-II' 'To my Friend Aldred' 'Work of a Professor' in New Ceylon Writing IV 14-24.
- 'In Ancient Kotmale' 'Stones' of Akuratiye Walauwa' 'The Poet' 'To my Friend Aldred' in Poems from India, Sri Lanka, Malaysia & Singapore, pp 77–81.
- Journal of South Asian Literature. (1976). vol. XII: The Poetry of Sri Lanka.
- 'The Poet' in Bomb, no. 40. 1992.

=== Anthologies Containing Works by Lakdasa Wikkramasinha ===
- Goonitilleke, D.C.R.A. (ed.). (2007–2010). Kaleidoscope : an anthology of Sri Lankan English literature. Colombo: Vijitha Yapa Publications.

=== Works about Lakdasa Wikkramasinha ===
- Dissanayake, Wimal. (1979). "A Note on Lakdasa Wikkramasinha's Sinhala Poetry" in Navasilu, II, pp. 31–2
- Gooneratne, Yasmine. (1979). "Dead ere his Prime: In Memory of Lakdasa Wikkramasinha" in New Ceylon Writing, IV, p. 12.
- Haththotuwegama, Gamini. (1979). "The Poetry of Lakdasa Wikkramasinha" in Navasilu, II 24-30.
- Jayatilaka, Lilani. (1987) Love Sex and Marriage in the Poetry of Lakdasa Wikkramasinha.
- Meddegama, U.P. (1979). "New trends in the Language of Sinhala Poetry" in New Ceylon Writing, IV, pp. 137–142.
