= Nihal Samarasinghe =

Sri Lankan singer and musician

- නිහල් සමරසිංහ
- Born: 1937; British Ceylon (now Sri Lanka)
- Died: 11 July 2017 (aged 79–80); Colombo, Sri Lanka
- Education: S. Thomas' College, Mount Lavinia
- Occupations: Singer, Saxophonist, Musician
- Years active: 1965–1996
- Spouse: Felicia Samarasinghe
- Children: Nuwan
- Musical career
- Genres: Pop; Playback singing; Sri Lankan music
- Instruments: Vocals; Saxophone
- Label: Torana

Nihal Samarasinghe, (Sinhala: නිහල් සමරසිංහ; 1937 – 11 July 2017), popularly known as Sam The Man was a famous Sri Lankan saxophonist and singer, who was considered an icon of the Sri Lanka English music scene. He played the Saxophone for Leonard Franke's band "The Manhattans" (Sri Lankan", "The Jetliners" in the 1960s, and also in his own band. He was active as a musician for 6 decades. Nihal was considered by many Sri Lankans as the 'King' of the Sing Along, he is said to have introduced the first Sing Along Concert in Sri Lanka in 1997.
