= Elanga Wikramanayake =

Sri Lankan lawyer

Elanga D Wikramanayake
- Occupation: Attorney at Law
- Known for: Solicitor General
- Title: Deshamanya

Deshamanya Elanga Devapriya Wikramanayake, known to many as E. D. Wikramanayake, was a Sri Lankan lawyer who served as the Solicitor General of Sri Lanka.

== Early life and education ==
His father was E. B. Wikramanayake, QC the Minister of Justice in the cabinet of Prime Minister Sir John Kotelawala and a member of the Senate of Ceylon. Educated at S. Thomas' College, Mount Lavinia, Sri Lanka, he excelled in rifle shooting, winning the Governor-General’s Cup at age 19.

The Wikramanayake family association with law can be traced back to Crown Proctorship in Galle in 1848. After obtaining a bachelor of laws degree, he trained at the Ceylon Law College. Later he obtained a master's degree in law from Stanford University.

== Legal career ==
Elanga joined the Attorneys General Department as a crown counsel in 1958 rising to the post of Solicitor General in 1977. He was the leading crown prosecutor for the Criminal Justice Commission in the 1970s prosecuting those violating the exchange control law in Sri Lanka.

He left the Attorneys General Department in 1977 and continued in private practice. He appeared in many cases against incumbent governments at a time when intimidation of the judiciary and legal process was not uncommon and is best known for his appearance on behalf of Sirimavo Bandaranaike and Felix Dias Bandaranaike before the Special Presidential Commission and later in opposing policies of her daughter Chandrika Kumaratunga. He also appeared for Industries Minister C. V. Gunaratne in a defamation case against Lalith Athulathmudali. Dayasiri Gunasekera and Mudaliyar pay tribute to his integrity, lack of political bias and impartiality. Dayasiri describes him as "a fearless fighter who cared only for the cause he fought for, and he fought it crisp and clean" . SL Gunasekera has classed him as one of the greats in Sri Lankan Law along with his close friend H. L. de Silva.

== Honours ==
He was awarded the title Deshamanya for his services to law. He is known to have declined the honours awarded by a government at the time on a matter of principle and was commended for it by leading lawyers.

== Outdoorsmen ==
Wikramanayake was known to be an outdoors man and for exploits such as rafting down the Kelani Valley. He was a lover of wild life and an enthusiastic angler.

== Family ==
His children are Eric Wikramanayake, Arittha R Wikramanayake, Athula Wikramanayake Mihiri Wikramanayake and Ananga Wikramanayake. His sons Eric Wikramanayake and Athula Wikramanayake are well known conservationists, biologists and experts on wild life, his son Arittha R Wikramanayake and granddaughter Ariesha have authored a book on butterflies of Sri Lanka.
