= Aubrey Kuruppu =

Sri Lankan cricketer (1945–2019)

Personal information
- Born: 11 March 1945; Dehiwela, Colombo, Ceylon
- Died: 11 October 2019 (aged 74); Kandy, Sri Lanka
- Batting: Left-handed
- Role: Batsman

Career statistics
Competition	First-class
Matches	2
Runs scored	91
Batting average	22.75
100s/50s	0/0
Top score	31
Catches/stumpings	1/–
- Source: Cricinfo, 13 November 2019

Aubrey Kuruppu (11 March 1945 – 11 October 2019) was a Sri Lankan cricketer who played two first-class matches in Sri Lanka in 1972 and 1973.

Aubrey Kuruppu was educated at S. Thomas' College, Mount Lavinia, where he played in the First XI, including the Royal–Thomian match in 1965. After his playing days he was secretary of the Kandy District Cricket Association and a member of the tour organising committee of the Sri Lanka Cricket Board for five years. He coached cricket at Vidyartha College and Sri Rahula College, Kandy. He also served as a match referee.
