= E. B. Wikramanayake =

Ceylonese statesman and lawyer

Eric Bird Wikramanayake, QC was a Ceylonese statesman and lawyer. He was the Minister of Justice in the cabinet of Prime Minister Sir John Kotelawala and a member of the Senate of Ceylon. A successful lawyer he was appointed a King's Counsel in 1948 and had been educated at S. Thomas' College, Mount Lavinia. He led the appeal of those convicted in the Bandaranaike assassination. He was the father of Elanga Wikramanayake and grandfather of Arittha R Wikramanayake, Eric Wikramanayake and Athula Wikramanayake. Wikramanayake was founder President of the Wildlife Protection Society of Sri Lanka and served on the Board of Governors of S. Thomas' College, Mount Lavinia.
