= Environmental Foundation Limited =

Public interest organisation in Sri Lanka

- Environmental Foundation (Guarantee) Limited
- Abbreviation: EFL
- Formation: 1981; 45 years ago
- Type: Non-governmental Organization
- Purpose: Environmental conservation Wildlife Conservation; Environmental Justice
- Location: Sri Lanka
- Methods: Public interest litigation, Advocacy, Awareness, Research
- Fields: Legal, Science
- Website: efl.lk

Environmental Foundation Limited (EFL) is a public interest litigation and environmental conservation organisation in Sri Lanka. Established in 1981, EFL seeks to protect and conserve the natural environment through litigation, advocacy, awareness and youth-engagement.

== Cases ==
=== Galle Face Green case ===
In 2005, the foundation won a case filed in the public interest to maintain the Galle Face Green Beach as a public utility.

=== Amarawewa Forest clearing for biofuel ===
The foundnation, together with Wildlife and Nature Protection Society and others, won a fundamental rights application filed in the Supreme Court against the planting of Gliricidia trees for biofuel production and illegal clearing of land to create roads in Amarawewa, near Yala National Park.

=== Air pollution cases ===
Environmental Foundation Limited instituted a case against the high levels of air pollution in the Colombo Metropolitan area in 2014. As a result, vehicle emission testing was initiated by Department of Motor Traffic and Central Environmental Authority.

A Fundamental Rights Application filed by the foundation to object to the use of coal to generate power resulted in the cancellation of a proposed coal power plant.

== Projects ==
=== Advocacy and Awareness ===
The foundation advocates for policies to ban single-use plastic items, carries out a project to restore the water quality in Kelani River, campaigns to prevent degazetting of protected areas for development projects, litigates against illegal tourism in ecologically sensitive areas, advocates against the downgrading of 'other state forests, litigates to stop deforestation in Wilpattu National Park, develops sustainable frameworks for PET recycling, advocates against illegal mining, promotes sustainable energy and publishes conservation research.

It hosts monthly panel discussions on different environmental issues such as deforestation, climate change and conducts awareness sessions and workshops for school children, university students and the public.

== See also ==
- Wildlife and Nature Protection Society
