= Quentin Israel =

Sri Lankan rugby union player

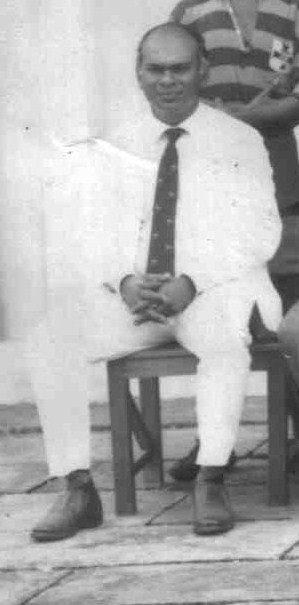
- Quentin Israel (1974)
- Born: Quentin Shelton Nagalingam Israel; 1934; Sri Lanka
- Died: 8 November 2007 (aged 72–73)
- Occupations: Rugby Coach and School Teacher

Quentin Shelton Nagalingam Israel (1934 – 8 November 2007) was a rugby coach and a school teacher from Sri Lanka.

== Education ==
Quenta, known to his friends as 'Q,' went to school at Trinity College, Kandy where he played rugby as a centre three-quarter between 1953 and 1954 under the guidance of Dharmasiri Madugalle and Lucky Vitharana. In 1954, he was the Captain of the Hockey team, as well as an accomplished hurdler. Though an alumnus of Trinity, 'Quenta', went on to coach S. Thomas for number of years, and even bested his alma-mater. He then coached the Thomians, taking 43 wins in a row, beating Trinity and winning the Bradby Shield on five occasions. He was a member of the staff at both institutions. Quenta was the president of Havelock Sports Club, as well as its coach. He has been called one of the best rugby coaches, having studied the strengths and weaknesses of every opposing team. He also served in the Sri Lanka Rugby Football Union.

== Club rugby ==
Israel represented the Havelock Sports Club from 1958 to 1965, and was a member of the 1961 Clifford Cup winning team. Although he did not represent Sri Lanka, he was a member of the All Ceylon pool and squad, which he would later coach, winning on many occasions. He also held positions of honorary secretary, entertainment secretary and president.

== Coach ==
He is most widely known as the 1st XV coach at S. Thomas' College, Mount Lavinia, who registered 43 wins in a row. One of his protégés was Sri Lankan player Michael Jayasekera, described by Havelocks Rugby Club coach Gamini Fernando as "being gift-wrapped and delivered to his club by Quentin Israel". Jayasekera went on to become the chairman of the board of selectors. Another protégé was Sri Lankan player P. L. Munasinghe. Jayasekera and Munasinghe both played in 1975 and 1976 and were later described as the best Thomian team, by sports journalist Sharm de Alwis.

He later coached Trinity College, which won the Bradby Shield on five occasions.

He also served the Sri Lanka Rugby Football Union (SLRFU), besides being the coach of the national under 19 side, and taking over coaching of Galle Rugby Football Club after retiring from Trinity College.

== Schoolmaster ==
Israel taught mathematics, chemistry, and physics, and is known for his emphasis on education despite his enthusiasm for Rugby. He also coached another XI Cricket team at S Thomas College, Mt Lavinia. Additionally, he served as a House Master and Headmaster of the Upper School, where he had the reputation of being a strict disciplinarian.

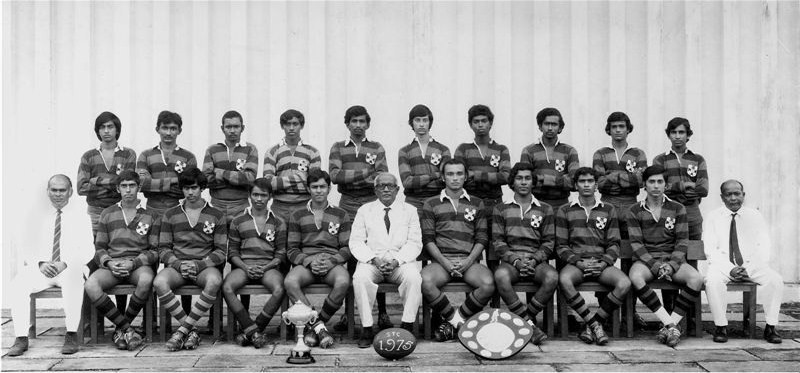
S Thomas College 1st XV Rugby Team 1975 Standing L to R Charity Wickramathilake, Ananda Welikala, Darup Pieris, SKN Fernando, Rienzie Fernando, Shane Pinder, Devaka Fernando, Rohitha Attygalle, Michael Jayasekera, Tushitha Ranasinghe Seated L to R Quentin Israel (Coach), Mahes Abeynaike, Theadore Thmabapillai, Pat Jacob, P. L. Munasinghe (Captain), S. J. Anandanayagam (Warden), Stefan D'Silva, Peter Vanniasingham, Loka Thilakaratne, Wilhelm Bogstra, Lassie Abeywardena (Master in Charge)

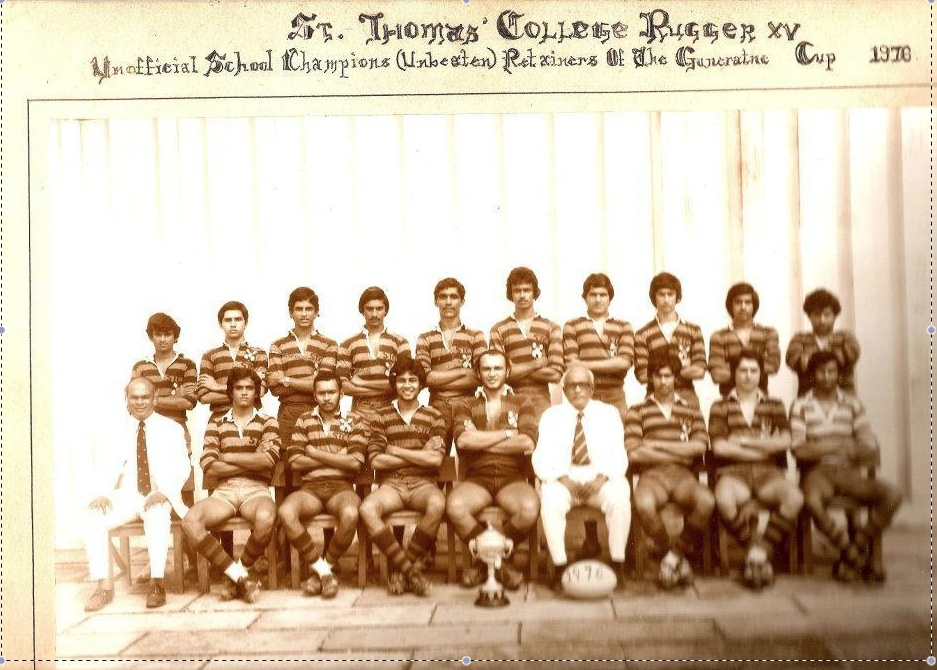
S Thomas' College Rugby 1st XV Team 1976 Standing: Avindre de Silva, R Wadugodapitiya, Eraj Gihan Ratnaike, Dyalan Supramanium, Kapila Waidyaratne, Jeya Poniah, Jeyakumar, Shane Pinder, Charith Wickramathilake, Wazil Hafeel Seated: Quentin Israel (Coach) Michael Jayasekera, Darup Pieris, P. L. Munasinghe, Stefan D'Silva (Captain), S. J. Anandanayagam (Warden), Theadore Thambipillai, Wilhelm Bogtsra, Rienzie Fernando

== Commemoration ==
Junior School Challenge Cups (donated by Herbert Lakshman Fernando) are awarded to the 'Most Promising Student' and the 'Best All-round Sportsman of the Year' at Trinity College in memory of Israel. The Toronto Chapter of the St Thomas College's Old Boys Association 7-a-side tournament rugby tournament for the Quentin Israel Memorial Trophy.
