= Saliya Ahangama =

Sri Lankan cricketer, coach, and commentator

Saliya Ahangama සාලිය අහංගම
Personal information
- Full name: Franklyn Saliya Ahangama
- Born: September 14, 1959 (age 67); Colombo
- Batting: Left-handed
- Bowling: Right-arm medium

International information
- National side: Sri Lanka (1985)
- Test debut (cap 28): 4 September 1985 v India
- Last Test: 14 September 1985 v India
- Only ODI (cap 41): 25 October 1985 v Pakistan

Career statistics
Competition	Test	ODI
Matches	3	1
Runs scored	11	–
Batting average	5.50	–
100s/50s	0/0	–
Top score	11	–
Balls bowled	801	18
Wickets	18	0
Bowling average	19.33	–
5 wickets in innings	1	–
10 wickets in match	0	–
Best bowling	5/52	–
Catches/stumpings	1/–	0/–
- Source: , 9 February 2006

Franklyn Saliya Ahangama (born 14 September 1959) is a Sri Lankan Australian cricket coach, commentator and former cricketer who played in 3 Tests and one ODI in 1985.

== After cricket ==
He would have played more tests, having a bowling average of 19, but retired due to constant injury. He then became a commentator. Saliya is now a cricket coach at the Melbourne Sports Stadium and Eastern Indoor Sports Centre. He is married and has two daughters.
