= P. L. Munasinghe =

Sri Lankan rugby player

Priyaraj Lakmal Munasinghe
- Occupations: Accountant, company executive
- Known for: Rugby Centre Three quarter

Priyaraj Lakmal Munasinghe, (also known as PL) is a Sri Lankan rugby player.

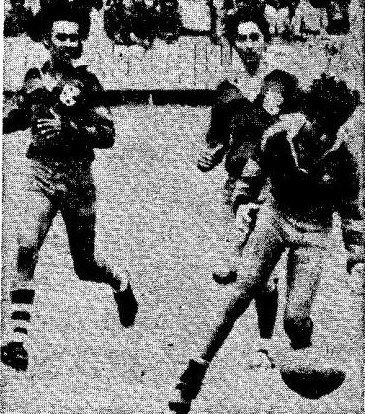
Centre Three-quarters PL Munasinghe, Wilhelm Bogstra in support as wing three quarter Devaka Fernando collects a grubber during The Royal Thomian Rugby Match 1975.

== Education ==
Munasinghe was educated at S. Thomas' College, Mt Lavinia Sri Lanka, where as Head Prefect he was awarded the Victoria Jubilee Gold Medal, winning colours in rugby and athletics. He played in the rugby first XV in 1973, 1974, captained the school in 1975, and played in 1976. He placed second in the under-19 100 metres (described in the school magazine by athletics captain WR Gunasena as a "lion hearted run") at the Public Schools Athletics meet in 1974 and was part of a successful 4x100 metres relay team.

=== The Royal Thomian Rugby Match 1975 ===
Under his leadership at the Royal Thomian rugby match in July 1975, his team came from behind to beat the favourites 8–3 to win the Michael Gunaratne Trophy. Sharm De Alwis has described his two tries as a "spectacular sensation" where he "sliced through the entire defence to score under the posts" not once but twice (it must be assumed that he sidestepped and cut inside, as De Alwis refers to him paralysing the opposing stand off – also referred to as fly half or No 10).

Leading from the front he not only scored the two match winning tries but marshalled a defence which the Ceylon Daily Mirror described as:

the virtual stone wall erected by the Thomian back division who tackled as if their life depended on it. Particularly impressive in this department was full back (Shane) Pinder, skipper Munasinghe and wing three quarter Devaka Fernando who tackled their opponents to a virtual standstill.", Mahesa Abeynayake describes their team spirit.

== Club and National Rugby ==
Munasinghe went on to captain the Sri Lanka schools against the Combined clubs side and subsequently represented Havelock Sports Club and Sri Lanka. Munasinghe has been listed among the best three-quarters to play rugby between 1968 and 1982. His career was cut short by a knee injury during a practice game.

== Professional ==
Munasinghe is a chartered accountant, a Fellow of the Institute of Chartered Accountants of Sri Lanka and a Fellow of the Chartered Institute of Management Accountants (UK).

He was a director in Carpenters Fiji Ltd and is currently chief executive officer of Courts (Fiji) Ltd. In November 2016 he was listed as the chairman of the Water Authority of Fiji.
