= Devaka Fernando =

Sri Lankan physician and academic

- Occupation: Physician
- Known for: Professor of Medicine, University of Sri Jayawardanapura
- Title: Professor

Devaka Fernando is a Sri Lankan physician and academic. He was president of the Osteoporosis Society of Sri Lanka and the Founding Professor of Medicine at the University of Sri Jayawardanapura.

== Education ==
Fernando was educated at Dean Row School in Cheshire, UK, Shore Country Day School in Beverly, Massachusetts and S. Thomas' College, Mt Lavinia, Sri Lanka. He received a Bachelor of Medicine, Bachelor of Surgery degree from the Faculty of Medicine, University of Colombo. Fernando received a Doctor of Medicine degree and membership of the Royal College of Physicians, trained in public health at the University of Manchester (Master of Science in Clinical Epidemiology) and trained as a specialist at the Manchester Royal Infirmary.

== Educational and professional activities ==
Fernando was a consultant physician in diabetes and the endocrinology department of the Sri Jayawardanapura General Hospital and a senior lecturer in the faculty of medicine at the University of Colombo. He was the Foundation Professor of Medicine at the University of Sri Jayewardenepura faculty of health sciences, coordinated the endocrinology training programme for the board of study in medicine at the University of Colombo's Postgraduate Institute of Medicine from 1998 to 2004, managed the World Diabetes Foundation project in Sri Lanka, was editor and vice-president of the Diabetes Association of Sri Lanka and was the founding director of the Sri Lanka Twin Registry. Fernando was a charter member of the board of study in medical administration at PGIM Colombo, was involved in the specialist training of doctors in Sri Lanka through the Royal College of Physicians and was connected to efforts to prevent discrimination against diabetes patients. He had a health-policy advisory / health care management consultancy role on a World Bank project as a consultant in a Institute of Health Policy managed Price Waterhouse Cooper project and engaging the media in diabetes care through the Diabetes Forum. Fernando was secretary in 1995 and 1997, treasurer in 1998 and vice-president in 2000 of the Sri Lanka Medical Association; secretary (1993–1996) and treasurer (1997–1998) of the Ceylon College of Physicians; founding president of the Osteoporosis Society of Sri Lanka (later named Osteoporosis Sri Lanka); from 2000 to 2004, editor (1994–1995) and treasurer (1996–2000) of the Endocrine Society of Sri Lanka; part of a Sri Lanka task force for the eradication of rabies, and charter committee members of the National Stroke Association of Sri Lanka and for the Brain Research and Neuroscience Centre's advisory panel. While working in Sri Lanka, Fernando held clinical and research fellowships and senior research fellowships at the University of Manchester, visiting professorships with the University of Newcastle Upon Tyne and the University of Sheffield and an honorary professorship at Sheffield Hallam University; he later emigrated to the United Kingdom.

== Research ==
=== Publications ===
Citation report
Total citations	1157
Citations without self-citations	1128
Citing articles	1013
Average citations per item	12.31
H-index	17

=== Grants ===
Fernando has been an applicant or co-applicant in grants received from the Wellcome Trust and the World Diabetes Foundation.

== Professional affiliations and honors ==
He has received academic honors from:

- The Ceylon College of Physicians (P. B. Fernando Gold Medal and Cyril Fernando Gold Medal)
- The Sri Lanka Medical Association (Sir Nicholas Attygalle Gold Medal)
- The Kandy Society of Medicine (Seneka Bibile Gold Medal and the Kandy Society of Medicine Gold Medal for Oration)
- The College of General Practitioners of Sri Lanka (Gunasiri Memorial Oration Gold Medal and Cyril Vaz Memorial Gold Medal for Oration)
- The Diabetes Association of Sri Lanka (Sir Frank Gunasekera Gold Medal for Oration)
- The Andhra Pradesh Diabetes Federation (M. Viswanathan Gold Medal)

With Victor Hettigoda, Fernando received a presidential award for research. He was made an honorary fellow of the College of General Practitioners of Sri Lanka an Honorary Fellow of the College of Medical Administrators of Sri Lanka and an Honorary Fellow of the College of Endocrinologists of Sri Lanka. He is a fellow of the Royal College of Physicians in London and Edinburgh and the Ceylon College of Physicians.

== Voluntary service ==
Fernando chaired the Endocrine and Metabolic Disease Trust, based in Dehiwala-Mount Lavinia, Ratmalana, from 1990 to 2004; helped establish a renal dialysis unit and transit home for patients and families visiting the University of Sri Jayewardenepura faculty of health sciences and its teaching hospital in 1998; set up computer servers linking the John Pease Diabetes Centre in Sutton-in-Ashfield, England and centres in Sri Lanka to aid education in Sri Lanka, and assisted in disaster relief after the 2004 Indian Ocean earthquake and tsunami.

== Other activities ==
Fernando was a school prefect, won awards in rugby and athletics (finished second in the 1973 400m junior national AAA championships), was active in classical, English debating and drama societies and was part of the rugby union Royal-Thomian rivalry on the 1975 S. Thomas' College team coached by Quentin Israel, called the best Thomian team by sports journalist Sharm de Alwis.

He captained the University of Colombo rugby team, scoring two tries in a victory against Colombo Hockey and Football Club; placed second in the 400m hurdles at the 1976 junior national AAA championships, and represented the Colombo Hockey and Football Club in the 1981 First Division Rugby Union tournament. Fernando has coached rugby teams in Sri Lanka and the UK.

== United Kingdom 2005- ==
Fernando moved to the United Kingdom in 2005, where he has been a consultant endocrinologist, Head of the Sherwood Forest Hospitals Foundation Trust's Department of Diabetes and Endocrinology at King's Mill Hospital and a member of the foot-care team, associate medical director for clinical governance and member of a trial steering committee. In collaboration with the Thyroid Association, he has delivered lectures with colleague George Thomson. Fernando is a board member of the Thanet Sheffield clinical commissioning groups and Northampton as well as a member of the Diabetes Think Tank, a parliamentary advisory group. and medical advisor to Parliamentary Health Service Ombudsman
