= Copleston =

Copleston may refer to:

== People ==
- Edward Copleston (1776–1849), English churchman and academic
- Ernest Copleston (1855–1933), Anglican Bishop, brother of Reginald
- Frederick Selwyn Copleston (1850–1935), civil servant in Burma; father of Frederick Charles
- Frederick Charles Copleston (1907–1994), Jesuit priest, historian of philosophy
- Geoffrey Copleston (1921–1999), British actor
- John Copleston (fl. 1655), Sheriff of Devon
- Reginald Copleston (1845–1925), Anglican Bishop in India, brother of Ernest

== Places ==
- Copplestone, Devon, England
- Copleston High School
