= Esto perpetua =

Latin phrase

Great Seal of Idaho with the state motto "esto perpetua"

Esto perpetua is a Latin phrase meaning "let it be perpetual".

It is the motto of Idaho. The motto appears on the back of the 2007 Idaho quarter dollar coin.

The words are traced back to the Venetian theologian and mathematician Paolo Sarpi (1552–1623), also known as Fra Paolo. The day before his death he had dictated three replies to questions on affairs of state, and his last words were "Esto perpetua" reportedly in reference to his beloved Republic (of Venice), and translated as "Mayest thou endure forever!" These words were also repeated by Henry Grattan upon the achievement of Irish legislative independence in 1782. When the designer of the state seal Emma Edwards Green described the motto on the seal, she translated it as "It is perpetuated" or "It is forever". The phrase was used by Jefferson Davis at the close of his book Rise and Fall of the Confederate Government in a wish that it may be "Written on the arch of the Union." Of his attempt to break up the Union, he said "I recognise the fact that the war showed it to be impractical".

A list of places the motto was adopted by:

- HMS Tireless, Trafalgar Class Submarine Royal Navy
- The National Grange of the Order of Patrons of Husbandry, a farm organization constituted in Washington, D.C., on December 4, 1867
- The Pirates Rugby Football Club in Dunedin, New Zealand, which was formed in 1882
- The Sigma Phi Society
- Phi Chi Fraternity of Young Harris College, established in 1891
- The Club
- Chatham Hall School, Chatham, Virginia, translated as "She will live forever"
- Three of the four Thomian Schools in Sri Lanka: those in Mount Lavinia, Gurutalawa and Bandarawela, translated as "Be Thou Forever"
- The motto of Springs Boys' High School, Springs, South Africa. "Esto Perpetua" has been the school's motto since it first opened in 1940.
- The motto of Springs Girls' High School, Springs, South Africa. "Esto Perpetua" has been the school's motto since it first opened in 1959.
- The Winyah Indigo Society, Georgetown, S.C., incorporated 1754.
- The Grand Lodge of British Freemasons in Germany incorporates the motto on its Grand Seal translated as "May it last forever"
- Carron Phoenix Manufacturer of sinks in Carron, Scotland.
- The Old Sydneians' Union, the alumni organisation of Sydney Grammar School.
- The Union Arch over Cabin John Creek, Maryland, USA.
