= Coplestone =

Coplestone is a given name and a surname. Notable people with the name include:

- Edward Coplestone (1776–1849), English churchman and academic
- John Coplestone, D.D. (1623–1689), English priest and academic
- Thomas Coplestone (1688–1748), British landowner, Whig politician and MP
- Michael William Coplestone Dillon Onslow (1938–2011), British Conservative politician
- Coplestone Bampfylde (disambiguation), several people

== See also ==
- Copleston (disambiguation)
- Copplestone
