= W. A. Robinson =

W. A. Robinson may refer to:

- William Alfred Robinson (Australian politician)
- Walter Allen Robinson, British administrator
- W. Andrew Robinson, British author
