= S. Thomas' College, Mount Lavinia =

S. Thomas' College

- College Quadrangle

Location
- Hotel Road, Dehiwala-Mount Lavinia; Colombo, Western Province; Sri Lanka
- 6°50′15″N 79°51′57″E

Information
- Former names: College of St. Thomas the Apostle; S. Thomas' College, Mutwal
- Type: Private
- Motto: Latin: Esto perpetua (Be Thou Forever)
- Religious affiliation: Christianity
- Denomination: Anglican
- Patron saint: St. Thomas
- Established: 3 February 1851; 175 years ago
- Founder: James Chapman
- Visitor to the College: Dushantha Lakshman Rodrigo
- Warden: Asanka Perera
- Chaplain: Samuel Ponniah
- Grades: 1–14; (including a nursery for children of Old Boys)
- Gender: Male
- Age: 2 to 19
- Enrollment: 2,800
- Education system: National Education System; Pearson Edexcel
- Language: English, Sinhala and Tamil
- Hours in school day: 07:25–13:30 SLST
- Campus type: Suburban
- Colours: Blue and black
- Song: Thomian Song
- Athletics: Yes
- Sports: Yes
- Newspaper: The Ternion
- Yearbook: The College Magazine
- Affiliation: Anglican Church of Ceylon
- Alumni: Old Thomians
- Brother schools: S. Thomas' Preparatory School; Royal College, Colombo; S. Thomas' College, Gurutalawa; S. Thomas' College, Bandarawela
- Website: stcmount.edu.lk
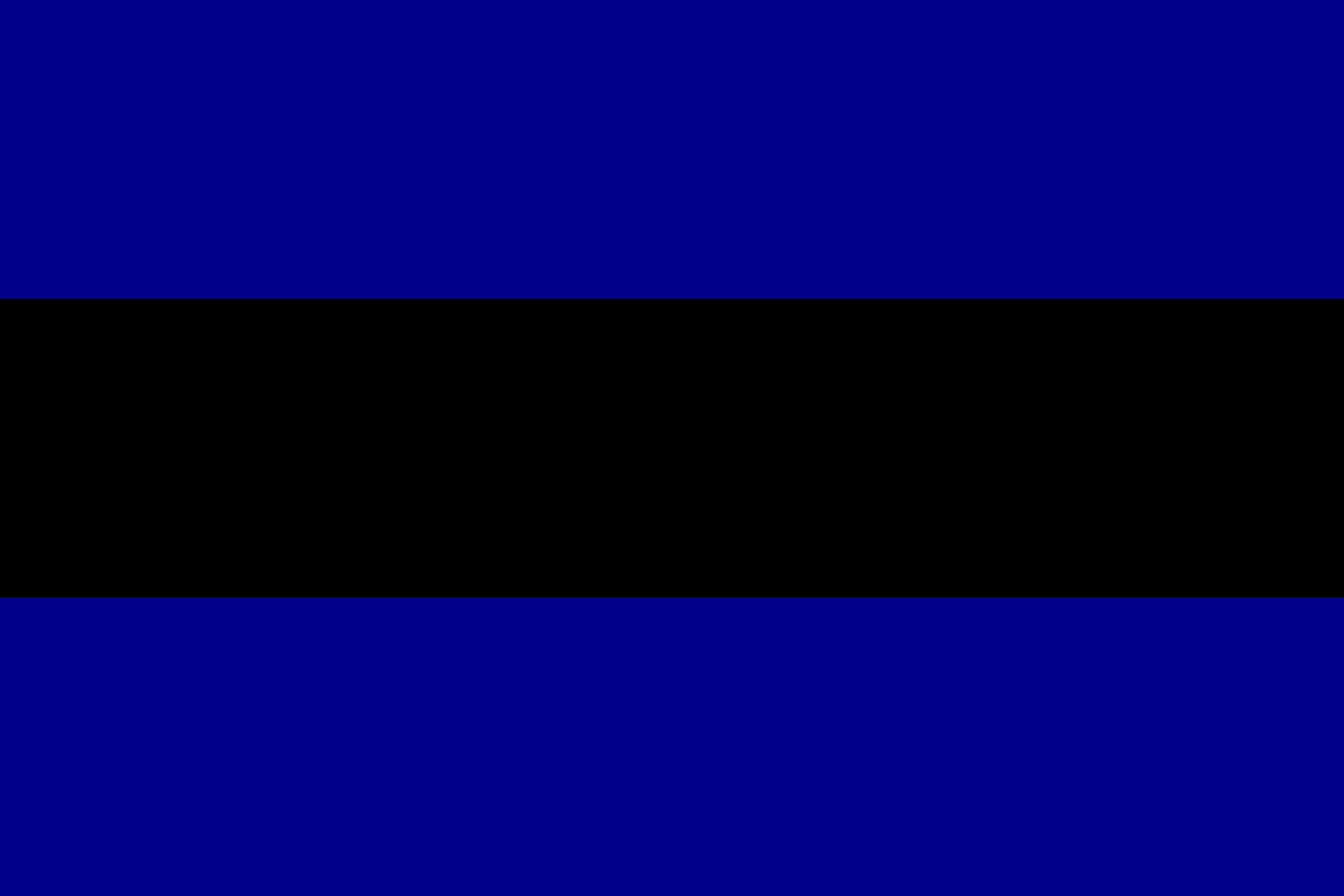
- Flag of S. Thomas' College

S. Thomas' College, Mount Lavinia (abbreviated as STC), is a fee-paying Anglican selective entry boys' private school in Mount-Lavinia, Sri Lanka. Started as a private school by James Chapman, the first Anglican Bishop of Colombo, in 1851, it was founded as a college and cathedral for the new Diocese of Colombo of the Church of Ceylon, modelled on British Public school tradition. An old boy of Eton College, Bishop Chapman founded the college on the Etonian model, the school's motto of Esto perpetua being derived from that of Eton College.

Following the public school tradition, S. Thomas' College is a partial boarding school, with some pupils living at the school seven days a week, and others residing in Day houses. Having been founded in 1851, it is among the oldest schools in Sri Lanka.

With a student body of approximately 2,800, S. Thomas' is considered as one of the most prestigious schools in Sri Lanka; a factor leading to its competitive rivalry with Royal College, Colombo. This rivalry has led to a Royal-Thomian rivalry tradition with annual cricket big match, the rugby match, water polo matches, and the Royal Thomian Regatta.

The college has educated prime ministers, world leaders, sportsmen and Booker Prize winners. The alumni of S. Thomas' College are referred to as Old Thomians, and include D. S. Senanayake, the first prime minister of Ceylon, S. W. R. D. Bandaranaike and two other prime ministers. Many of the prominent leaders of Sri Lanka's independence movement in the early twentieth century were educated at the college. These include Leslie Goonewardene, who founded Sri Lanka's first political party, the Lanka Sama Samaja Party and N. M. Perera, who served as leader of the opposition and the first Trotskyist to become a cabinet minister.

== College ==
=== Location ===
S. Thomas’ College is situated in a quiet suburb approximately half an hour from the southern limits of the City of Colombo. The school's entrance is characterised by the Chapel of the Transfiguration. Built in 1923 and designed by P. A. Adams, the chapel, at 40 m (130 ft) long and 12 m (39 ft) high, had its foundation stone lain by Earnest Arthur Copleston, bishop of Colombo. The main school body is modelled on that of the British public school model, comprising the primary quadrangle, the college hall, main buildings and library. The school's grounds reach the city of Mount Lavinia.

=== Administration ===
Having been managed by a board of governors since 1927, S. Thomas’ College is chaired by the Anglican Bishop of Colombo as ‘Visitor to the College’. The school's administration remains deeply rooted in Anglicanism, with a further chaplaincy for the aforementioned Chapel of the Transfiguration. The administration of the College itself is headed by a warden. Admission to the college is at the sole discretion of the warden.

The college is divided into the primary (grades 1–5), lower secondary (grades 6–8) and upper secondary schools (grades 9-11), followed by the senior school. These combined sectors amount to the college's student body of approximately 2,800 – stemming from varied faiths and ethnicities.

=== Mutwal ===
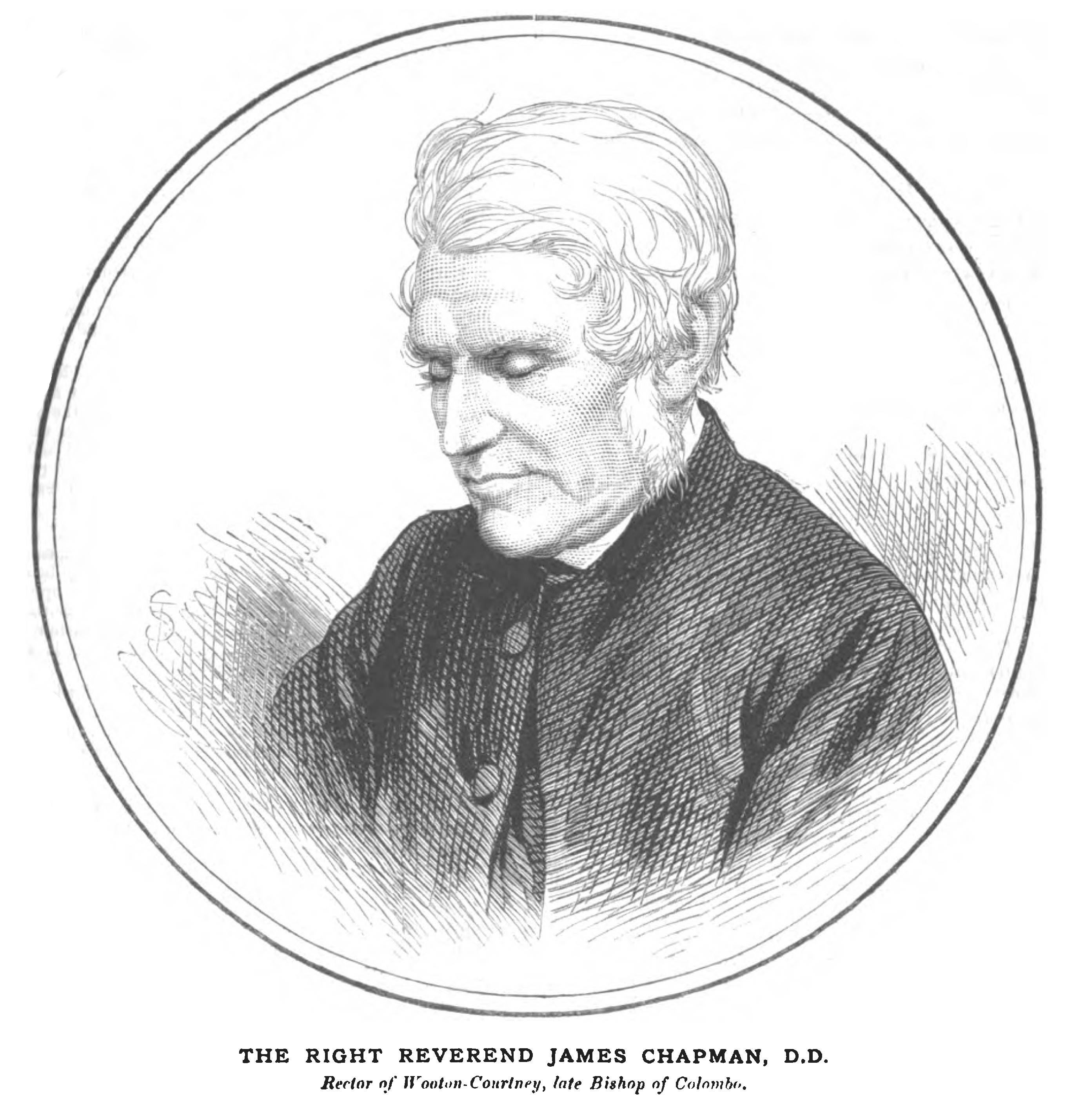
The Rt. Rev. James Chapman

S. Thomas’ College was founded by the first Bishop of Colombo, James Chapman, who had been educated at Eton and King's College, Cambridge. Chapman's vision included building as a college and cathedral for the new Diocese of Colombo of the Church of Ceylon, modelled on the British Public School system he was accustomed to. An old boy of Eton College, Bishop Chapman founded the college on the Etonian model, and even borrowed the school motto, Esto Perpetuas, from Eton.

Chapman's objective was to train a Christian clergy and to make children good citizens under the discipline and supervision of Christianity. In 1852 Bishop Chapman laid the foundation stone of the college chapel on a hill in the school grounds. The chapel became Christ Church Cathedral of the Colombo Diocese of the Church of Ceylon when it was dedicated on 21 September 1854.

=== Mount Lavinia ===
In 1918, the school moved away from the "dusty environs" of Mutwal, which was near the Colombo harbour, to a more picturesque location near the sea in Mount Lavinia. On 13 October 1923, the foundation stone for what would become the Chapel of the Transfiguration was laid by the Bishop of Colombo, Ernest Arthur Copleston, and the chapel was completed on 12 February 1927, when it was consecrated by the Bishop of Colombo Mark Carpenter-Garnier. In 1968, David Paynter, the noted Sri Lankan painter, completed his mural of the Transfiguration of Jesus upon the interior of the east wall of the chapel, which included a then unusual "beardless Christ". In 1951, S. Thomas' became a private fee-levying school.

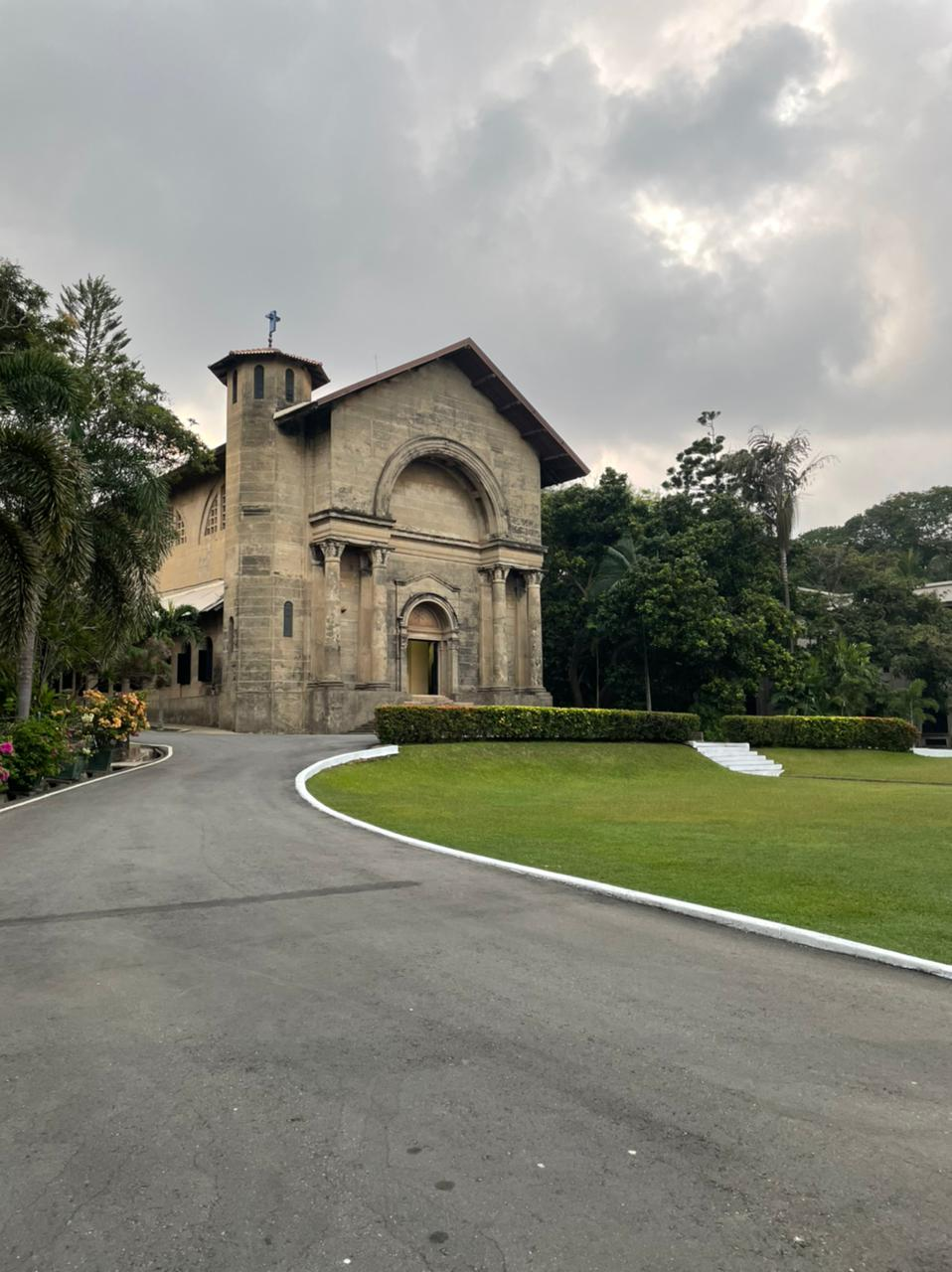
The Chapel of the Transfiguration

== Song ==
The "Thomian Song" was first introduced in the April issue of the College Magazine in 1916. The lyrics of the College Song were written by Mr. Edmund de Livera, a Royalist; and music was composed by Revd. W. A. Stone, 8th Warden of the College. The 5th line of the 2nd verse was amended in the time of Warden M. L. C. Illangakoon on a suggestion made by the late Mr. Mervyn Casie-Chetty, and ‘King’ was replaced by ‘State’.

== Houses ==
There are five houses at the college, four of which are "day houses", for those who do not live in the boarding house. From the college's inception, boarders were admitted under a dormitory system, under which each dormitory had a master after whom the dormitory was named. Around 1900, it was proposed that the college have a permanent house system introduced, however this was rejected. The shift to a permanent house system was only to take place with the move to Mount Lavinia. The houses were named Claughton, Chapman, Read, Copleston and Miller. There was also a small, rather short-lived Winchester House (although the present Primary School boarding facility is still known by this name). At the time, Miller and Copleston were senior houses.

An organised house system was introduced following the school's founding by Warden K. C. McPherson, with the aims to encourage boys to take part in extracurricular activities. In 1926, the day boys were divided first into 5 houses, namely Wood, Buck, Stone, Jermyn, and Baly. Boys were allotted in them according to the location of their residences. Wood house consisted of boys from Ratmalana, further south and from Nugegoda and Borella. Stone and Buck housed children from Mount Lavinia, the former consisting of those whose surnames starts from A to M, while the latter of the rest. Baly housed boys who lived in Wellawatte and Bambalapitiya. Children who were from Dehiwala, Slave Island & Fort were allotted in Jermyn House. This system was not found successful because there were insufficient numbers to divide fairly and equally among five day houses. By the end of the year, Jermyn and Baly houses were discontinued and the boys were reassigned into the remaining houses according to their form. The same happened to the boarding houses, and Read house was also discontinued.

In 1932, the boarding house system of two senior houses and two junior houses was discarded in favour of an alternative system.

Current houses of the college
House name	House motto	House colours	Year established
De Saram	Strive, Achieve, Preserve	Green and black	1958
Buck	Mens Sana in Copore Sano (A sound mind in a sound body)	Blue and silver	1926
Wood	Fulfilment of Prophecy	Blue and maroon	1926
Stone	Sauitier in modo; Fortiter in re (Gentle in manner, Brave in action)	Maroon and silver	1926
Boarding	Miller-Chapman: Omnia Vincit Durus labor (We lead, others follow) Copleston and Claughton: Determined, Dared and Done	Maroon and white	

== Sports ==
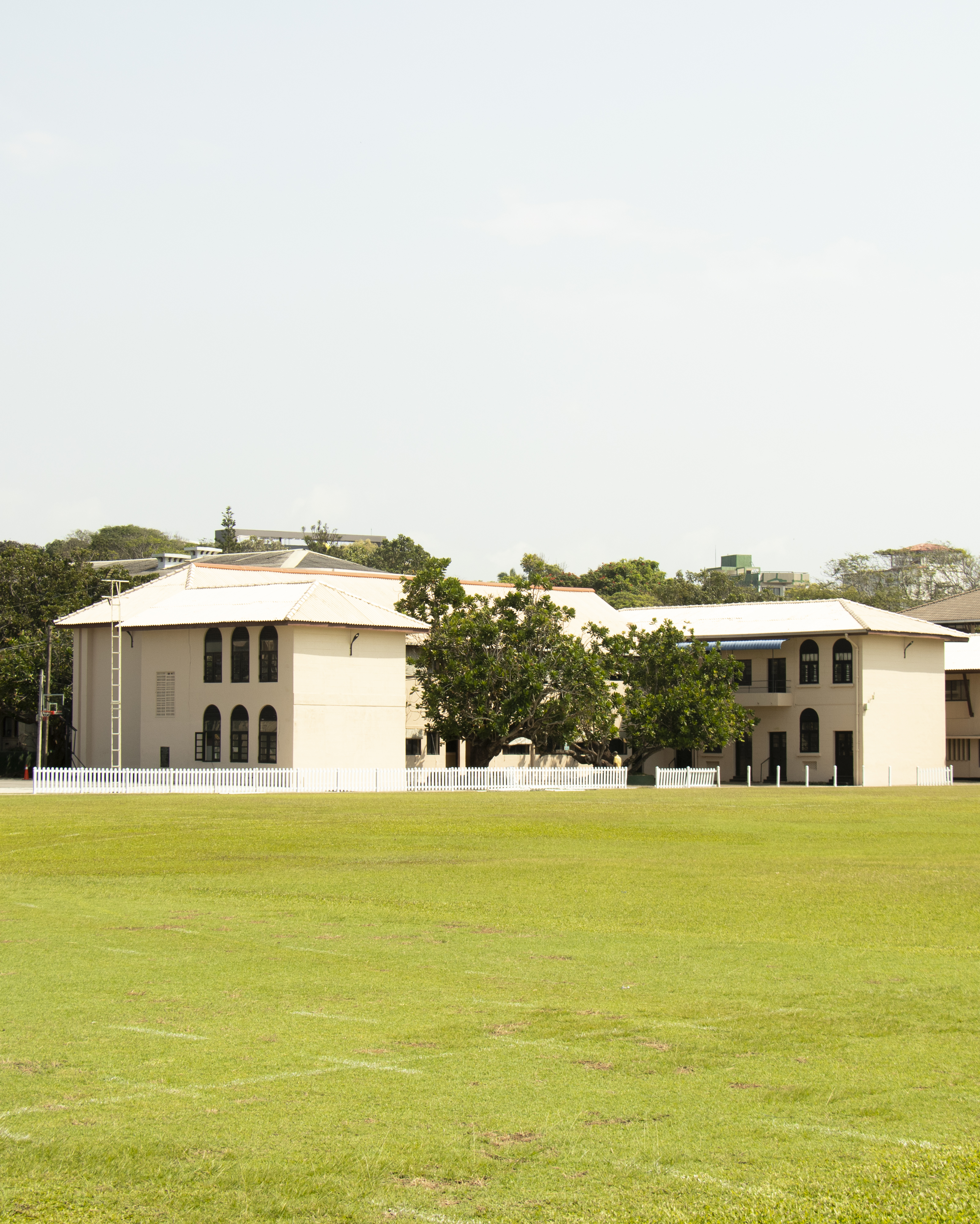
The Big Club Grounds of the College

The most prominent sports are those classified as the "Royal-Thomian". These sports take precedence because of the importance given to the clash between S. Thomas' oldest rival, the Royal College, Colombo.

A cricket match between these colleges takes place in the first term of Lent every year. As the rains begin in Michaelmas Term, the rugby season has kicked off and the main encounter is the Royal-Thomian Rugby match. As the year ends with the term of Yuletide, the highlights are the Royal Thomian Regatta and the Boat Race for the oarsmen of the two Colleges and simultaneously the two leg Water Polo matches for the R.L. Hayman trophy.

=== Royal-Thomian Cricket Match ===
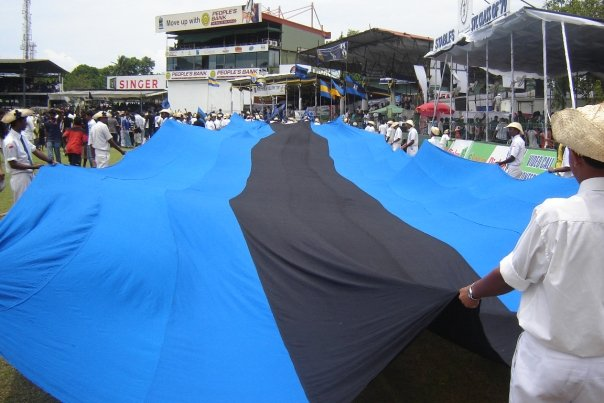
A Thomian flag at the 129th Royal Thomian

The Royal-Thomian is the annual cricket match between Royal College, Colombo, and S. Thomas' College, Mt Lavinia. It is the second longest uninterrupted cricket match series in the world and the first and oldest in Sri Lanka, even older than the Ashes cricket series, having been played for more than 140 years continuously. The original match was played between the Colombo Academy and S. Thomas' College, Mutwal, in 1879, with schoolmasters participating as well as schoolboys. From 1880 onwards, only schoolboys were allowed to play in the match. The match is played for the D.S. Senanayake Memorial Shield, which was first presented in 1928. From 1979 matches were played for 3 days except in 1985 which was a 2-day match. A limited overs match (50 overs) was introduced in 1975 and is played for the Mustangs Trophy.

=== Royal-Thomian Rugby Match ===
The Royal-Thomian rugby match held annually in the Michaelmas Term of S. Thomas. and between the two sessions of Bradby Shield Encounter of Royal since 1955. It is played for the Michael Gunaratne Trophy.

=== Royal-Thomian Rowing Regatta ===
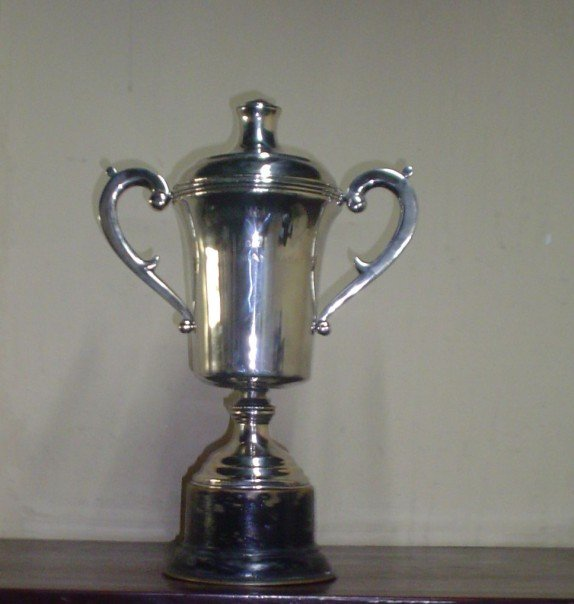
The T Noel Fernando Memorial Trophy awarded to the overall winner of the Royal Thomian Regatta.

The Royal-Thomian Regatta (or Boat Race) is the annual rowing encounter between the Royal College and S. Thomas' College rowing crews. Having begun in 1962 'the Regatta' is the third oldest sporting encounter between Royal College and S. Thomas' College, after the Battle of the Blues Cricket Match and the Royal-Thomian Rugby Match. As of now, the event consists of eight school-boy races which carry points and three exhibition races that carry no points. The most important event which is 'The Boat Race' carries twelve points. The races are rowed over a distance of 910 m (1,000 yd) and take place on the Beira Lake in Colombo. The regatta takes place in the Michaelmus term of S. Thomas' College, usually in the month of October and is traditionally held on the last Saturday of the month at the Colombo Rowing Club. The Royal Thomian Regatta is the oldest inter-mural rowing regatta in Sri Lanka. The overall winner is awarded the T. Noel Fernando Memorial Trophy.

=== Royal-Thomian Tennis Match ===
The Royal Thomian Tennis is the annual tennis tournament between Royal College and S. Thomas' College, Mount Lavinia. The victor is awarded the E. F. C. Pereira memorial trophy.

=== Royal-Thomian Water Polo Matches ===
The Dr. R.L. Hayman Trophy is awarded to the winner of the annual two leg Water Polo fixture between Royal College, Colombo, and S. Thomas' College, Mt Lavinia. While Water Polo matches between the two schools have been held on and off through the annals of the two schools shared histories, the matches were made a permanent fixture as part of the two schools sporting calendars in 1992 as the Dr. R. L. Hayman Trophy Royal-Thomian Water Polo Matches. The event was initially played in home and away swimming pools. However, while it is still a two leg event, for the past several years it has been held at the Sugathadasa Stadium Swimming Pool allowing for much larger participation and making it the best patronised Water Polo matches in Sri Lanka and Asia. As of 2019 the tally stands at S.Thomas' winning 16, Royal winning 8 and 3 matches drawn.

== Wardens ==
The Warden of S. Thomas' College is appointed by the Board of Governors to run the day-to-day activities of the College. Shown below is the list of Wardens who have served the College:

Wardens of S. Thomas' College
No.	Name	From	To	Special notes
Mutwal
1	Cyril William Wood	1851	1853	First Warden of the College at Mutwal
2	Joseph Baly	1854	1860	
3	George Bennet	1863	1866	
4	James Bacon	1871	1877	
5	Edward Miller	1878	1891	
6	Philip Read	1892	1895	
7	William Armstrong Buck	1896	1901	
8	William Arthur Stone	1901	1918	
Mount Lavinia
1	William Arthur Stone	1918	1924	First Warden of the College at Mount Lavinia
2	Kenneth C. McPherson	1925	1930	Archdeacon Emeritus of Bombay
3	Reginald Stewart de Saram	1932	1958	First Ceylonese and Old Boy Warden
4	Charles Henry Lambert Davidson	1959	1964	First Lay Warden
5	Anton John Chandiah Selvaratnam	1965	1969	
6	Samuel James Anandanayagam	1969	1977	
7	Michael Llewelyn Christopher	1977	1982	
8	Wilfred Michael Neville de Alwis	1983	1998	
9	David Arjunan Ponniah	2001	2008	
10	John Charles Puddefoot	2009	2011	
11	Indra De Soysa	2012	2014	
12	Marc Billimoria	2014	2024	
13	Asanka S. Perera	2025	Present	

In the early days of the College, acting Wardens served during interregnum periods whilst new Wardens were being chosen back in the United Kingdom, under whom Ceylon was a colony at the time.

== Notable alumni ==
Past students of S. Thomas' are referred to as Old Thomians, and include many distinguished figures. The school produced the first prime minister of Sri Lanka, D. S. Senanayake, the Head Mudaliyar of Ceylon - Sir Solomon Dias Bandaranaike, and three other prime ministers; Dudley Senanayake, Solomon Bandaranaike and Wijeyananda Dahanayake.

Many of the prominent leaders of the independence movement in the early twentieth century were educated at the college. These include Leslie Goonewardene, who founded Sri Lanka's first political party, the Lanka Sama Samaja Party and N. M. Perera, who served as leader of the opposition and the first Trotskyist to become a cabinet minister.

Some Notable Alumni of the College

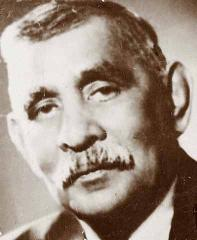
D. S. Senanayake

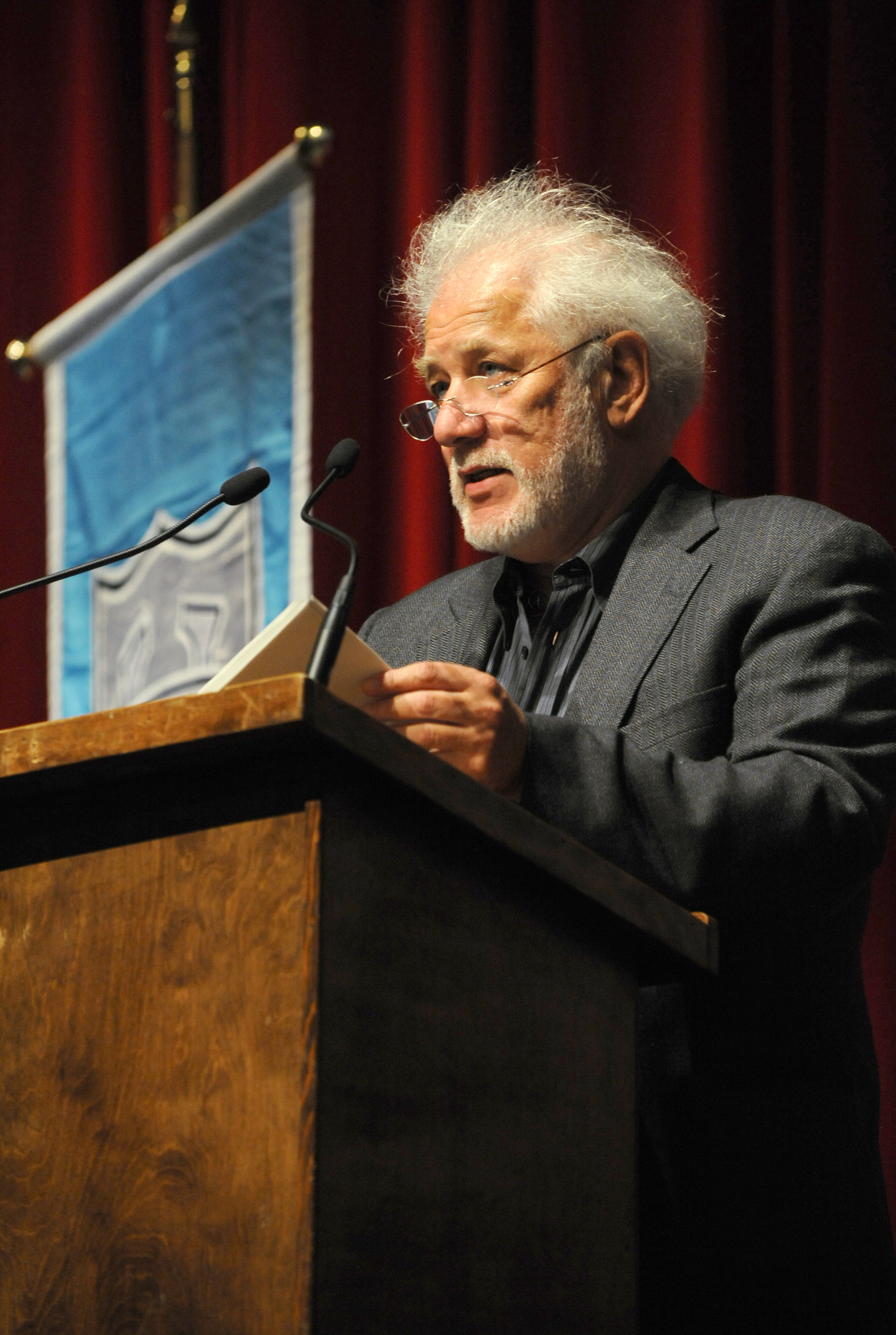
Michael Ondaatje

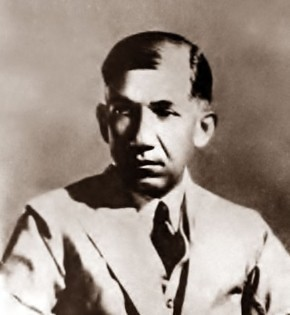
D. R. Wijewardena

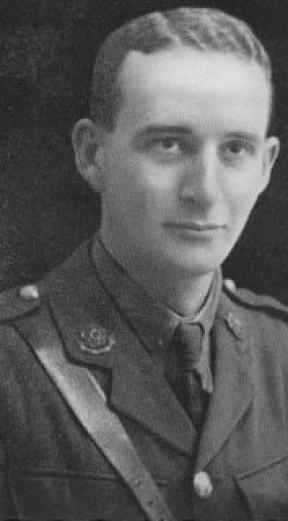
Basil Horsfall

== See also ==
- List of schools in Sri Lanka
- Big Match
- Battle of the Blues

=== Branches ===
- S. Thomas' College, Bandarawela
- S. Thomas' College, Gurutalawa
- S. Thomas' Preparatory School
