= S. Thomas' Preparatory School =

Private school in Kollupitiya, Sri Lanka

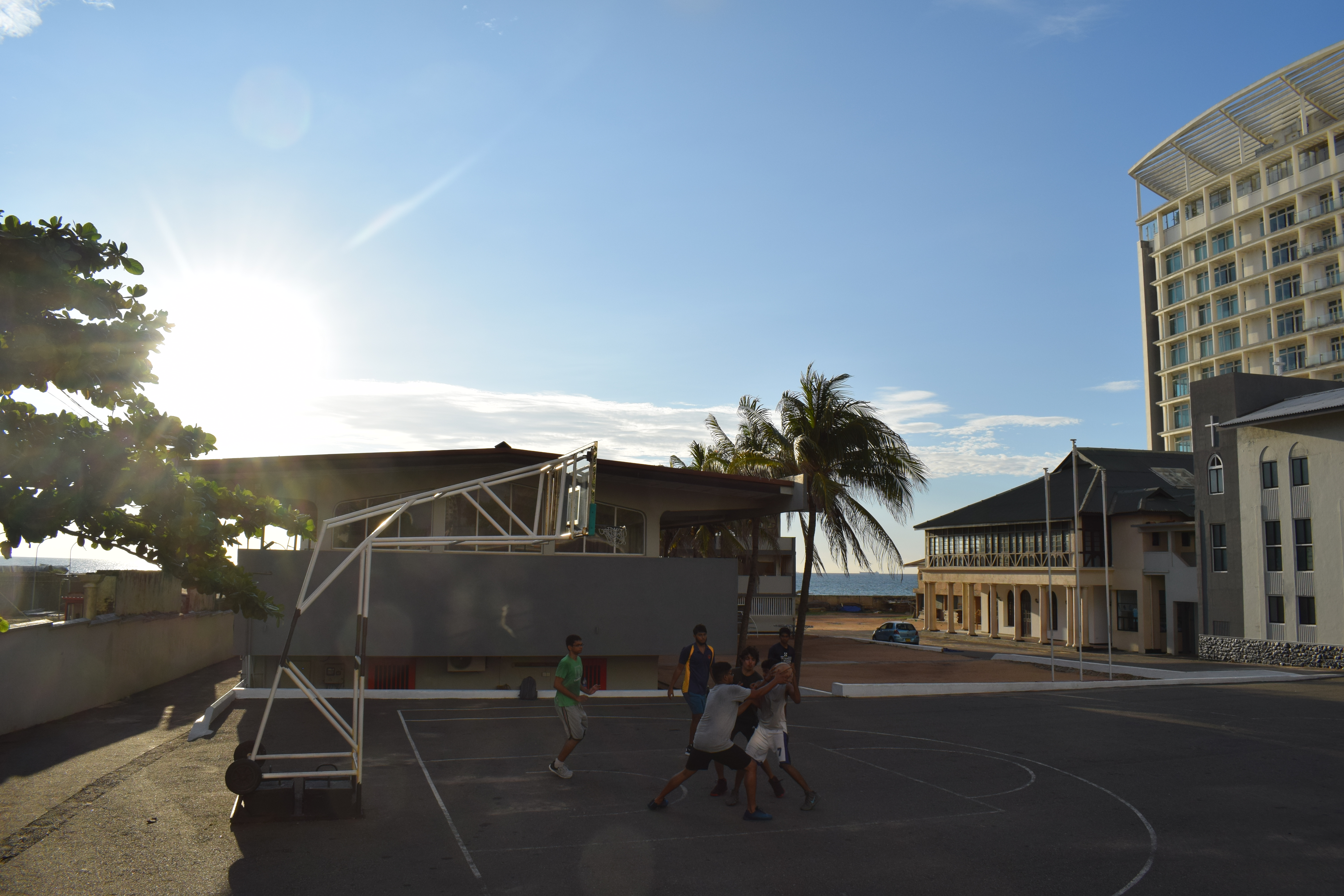
- Main Gate of the School

Location
- 98 Steuart Place, Kollupitiya; Colombo, Western, 00300; Sri Lanka
- Coordinates: 6°55′0.6″N 79°50′50.4″E

Information
- Type: Private
- Motto: The Lord is my Shepherd
- Religious affiliation: Christianity
- Denomination: Anglican
- Patron saint: St. Thomas
- Established: 17 May 1938; 87 years ago
- Founder: William Thomas Keble
- Headmaster: Nihal Fernando
- Grades: 1 - 11
- Gender: Male
- Age range: 6 - 16
- Enrollment: 900
- Language: Sinhala, Tamil, English
- Hours in school day: 07:45 - 13:45
- Campus type: Urban
- Colours: Dark blue, light blue and white
- Song: "Cheer Cheer Prep School Boys"
- Newspaper: Prep News
- Affiliation: Church of Ceylon, S. Thomas' College, Mount Lavinia
- Alumni name: S. Thomas’ Preparatory School, Old Boys’ Union
- Brother Schools: S. Thomas' College, Mount Lavinia; S. Thomas' College, Gurutalawa; S. Thomas' College, Bandarawela
- Website: www.stps.edu.lk

S. Thomas' Preparatory School (abbreviated as STPS) is a private, Anglican, multi-ethnic, primary and secondary day school for boys aged 5 to 16 years, located in Kollupitiya in the Colombo District of the Western Province of Sri Lanka.

The school was founded on 17 May 1938 as a branch preparatory school of S. Thomas' College, Mount Lavinia. It is governed by the Board of Governors of S. Thomas' College of the Church of Ceylon. The school is amongst the elite schools of Sri Lanka and is affiliated with the three other Thomian schools and colleges administered by the Church of Ceylon.

== History ==
S. Thomas' Preparatory School was founded on 17 May 1938 by William Thomas Keble, while Sri Lanka was under British colonial rule. Keble was a British scholar, author, educationalist, and an alumnus of Keble College, Oxford, which was named after his maternal great-uncle John Keble. He arrived in Ceylon in 1928 to join the staff of S. Thomas' College, Mount Lavinia, during the tenure of warden Kenneth McPherson.

He was the author of several books, including Ceylon, Beaten Track, A History of St. Thomas' College, Colombo, and Astrapani: A Romance of Sigiriya, a novel based on Sigiriya. The school was the first preparatory school to be established in Sri Lanka based on the English public school model.

The institution, which commenced with a student population of 95 boys and a staff of seven teachers, currently has a student population of 975 and over 100 staff members. At first, the school only accepted students between the ages of 5 and 11 years, as its founders tried to focus on the educational needs of younger children without the interference or influence of older students. Nevertheless, over the years the school began accepting older students, and currently has classes up to grade 11 in preparation for the GCE Ordinary Level examination.

== School administration ==
The school is governed by the Anglican Church of Ceylon. It is classified as a private fee levying school and is not financially dependent on the government. It is administered by a Board of Governors (established by the S. Thomas' College Board of Governors Ordinance No. 7 of 1930) of which the chairman is the Anglican Bishop of Colombo, thereby retaining a connection between the church and the school. The day-to-day activities are managed by the headmaster. The school has a sectional head for the upper, middle, and primary schools.

Rev. Dushantha Lakshman Rodrigo assumed duties as headmaster on 1 January 2015 and continued to serve until 2021, when he was appointed the 16th Anglican Bishop of Colombo.

Rev. Nihal Fernando was inducted as the school's sixth headmaster in February 2021.

== Demographics ==
The student population is in excess of 900 students, aged 5 to 16 years, although the roll has declined from its peak of around 1,100 students in the year 2000. The students come from diverse ethnic backgrounds (Sinhala, Tamil and Moor amongst others). The four main faiths practiced by the students of the school, in descending order of frequency, are Christianity, Buddhism, Hinduism, and Islam. The majority of students live in the suburbs of Colombo.

== Facilities ==
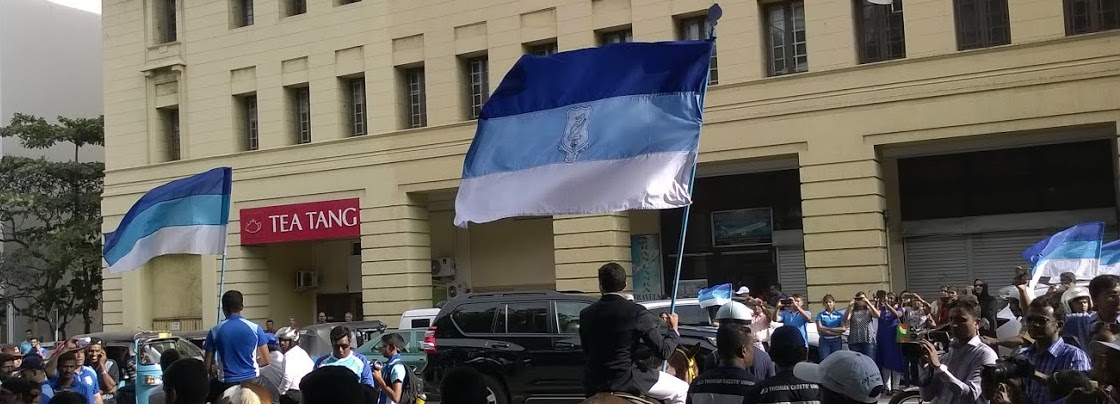
Flags of S. Thomas' Preparatory School, Kollupitiya displayed at the 2017 School Walk

The school campus consists of an assembly hall, over 50 classrooms, a chapel, a computer laboratory, two music rooms, three art rooms, two playing fields, two basketball courts and a cafeteria. The school has separate laboratory facilities for science.

== House system ==
Students of the school are allocated into are allocated into one of four houses:

Houses
House Name	House Motto	House Colour	Other Information
Carpenter-Garnier	Excelsior		The house is named after the sixth Bishop of Colombo, Rev. Mark Carpenter-Garnier, who was Lord Bishop of Colombo in 1938 when the school was founded.
Abeynaike	One Team, One Dream		The house is named after the School's first headmaster, Norman Gray Abeynaike.
De Saram	Veni Vidi Vici		The house is named after Canon R. S. De Saram, who was Warden of S. Thomas' College, Mount Lavinia when the school was founded and the first manager of the school.
Keble	Strive to Achieve		The house is named after the school's founder, William Thomas Keble.

The houses compete against each other in many sporting events throughout the year. An athletics championship, traditionally held each year in February, facilitates students in each of the four houses to compete in athletic events.

== Headmasters ==
Headmasters of S. Thomas' Preparatory School, Kollupitiya
No.	Name	From	To	Special Notes
1.	William Thomas Keble	1938	1942	Founder
2.	N. G. Abeynaike	1943	1950	First headmaster
3.	J. T. R. Perinpanayagam	June 1951	August 1966	
4.	J. S. L. Fernando	September 1966	1994	Longest-serving headmaster
5.	N. Y. Casie Chetty	1995	2014	
6.	Dushantha Lakshman Rodrigo	2015	January 2021	16th Bishop of Colombo
7.	Nihal Fernando	February 2021	Present	Incumbent headmaster
