= Guy Rutledge =

Sir John Guy Rutledge, KC (18 March 1872 – 15 February 1930 in Rangoon, Burma) was a British barrister and colonial judge and official in Lower Burma.

== Early life and career in England ==
Born in Aughnahoo, County Tyrone, Rutledge was educated at Queens College Galway, where he served as auditor of the college's Literary and Debating Society for the 1893-1894 session. He was awarded the BA degree of the Royal University of Ireland in 1893, and took his MA in 1894. He remained at QCG to study law, gaining scholarships in law for 1894-1895 and 1895-1896, and a senior exhibition in law for 1896-1897. Rutledge continued his studies in London, and was called to the bar by the Inner Temple in 1897. He devilled in the chambers of Mr Justice Horridge for 1897–8, after which he joined the Northern Circuit and practiced at Liverpool from 1898 to 1908.

== Career in Burma ==
In 1908, he entered the Colonial Service, and was appointed Secretary of the Burma Legislative Council and Assistant Secretary to the Government of Burma. After more than a decade in Burma, Rudledge returned to the practice of law, and was appointed Government Advocate of Burma in 1919; he was called to the Inner Bar in 1921. In 1922, he was appointed a Judge of the High Court of Judicature at Rangoon. Following the resignation of Sir Sidney Maddock Robinson, Rutledge succeeded as Chief Justice of the High Court of Judicature at Rangoon on 4 December 1924.

Rutledge was a strong supporter of the government of Sir Harcourt Butler and its policies. His decision to concentrate superior jurisdiction in the Rangoon High Court was strongly opposed by Upper Burma who preferred the jurisdiction of the Chief Court of Mandalay. Rutledge was knighted in 1926, and took an active part in the Rangoon Community. He gave assistance and funding to the new University of Rangoon and subsequently became a fellow of the same institution; he was also chairman of the committee of the Rangoon Zoological Gardens. He travelled extensively throughout the world, and married Margaret Lumby in 1927.

Rutledge died of a paralytic stroke at his residence in Rangoon on 15 February 1930.
