= Prasanna Payoe =

Sri Lankan Military Officer

Air Vice Marshal M. D. A. Prasanna Payoe
- Born: 1967 (age 58–59); Bandarawela Uva Province
- Allegiance: Sri Lanka
- Branch: Sri Lanka Air Force
- Service years: 1985 - 2022
- Rank: Air Vice Marshal
- Service number: 01557
- Commands: Chief of Staff
- Awards: Rana Wickrama Padakkama; Rana Sura Padakkama Uththama Seva Padakkama

Air Vice-Marshal M. D. A. Prasanna Payoe (also known as AVM Prasantha Payoe) is a retired Air officer of the Sri Lanka Air Force who served as Chief of Staff of the Sri Lanka Air Force. Prior to this appointment, he served as Director Training and the Director Air Operations. He also served as Base Commander of Sri Lanka’s largest air force base, Katunayake.

== Early life and education ==
Payoe completed his education at S. Thomas' College, Bandarawela. Then he join Sri Lankan Air Force in 1985 at General Duties Pilot Branch. He is a graduate of Defence Services Command and Staff College Sapugaskanda, Sri Lanka and completed NDC from the National Defence University, Pakistan.

== Air Force career ==
He also served as Defence Attaché to the Russia Federation. After being promoted to AVM he became Director General of the Centre for Defence Research. He retired from active service on 12 September 2022 while serving as Chief of Staff of the SLAF. AVM Prasanna Payoe died on 18 Jan 2025, after very brief illness, in Colombo.
