= Percy Sproule =

Ceylonese born colonial judge (1873–1954)

Percy Julian Sproule
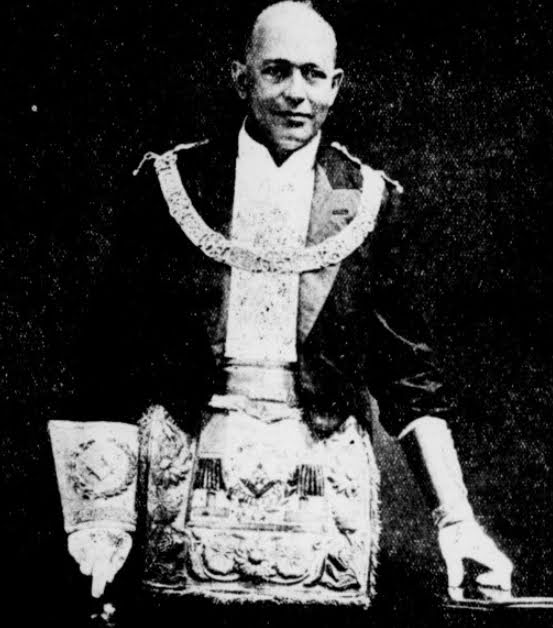
- Sproule from a 1925 publication
- Born: 4 December 1873
- Died: 17 January 1954 (aged 80); London
- Education: St Thomas's College, Colombo
- Alma mater: Pembroke College, Cambridge
- Occupation: Colonial judge
- Years active: 1905–1933

Percy Julian Sproule (4 December 1873 – 17 January 1954) was a Ceylonese-born barrister and colonial judge who served as acting Chief Justice of the Straits Settlements and acting Chief Judicial Commissioner of the Federated Malay States.

== Early life and education ==
Sproule was born into a well known Ceylonese family on 4 December 1873 at Badulla, the second son of James Hugh Sproule, a prominent criminal lawyer in Ceylon. He was educated at St Thomas's College, Colombo, where he won a government scholarship, and proceeded to Pembroke College, Cambridge where he took the BA in 1894 and in the following year was called to the Bar, Middle Temple.

== Career ==
Sproule entered the Straits Settlements civil service as a cadet in November 1895, and shortly after went to Amoy to study Hokkien. In 1897, he was appointed acting Deputy Registrar of the Supreme Court of Penang and later magistrate. In 1905, he was appointed acting Deputy Public Prosecutor, Singapore, while in the following year also served as assistant to the Colonial Secretary, and then in the same year as acting Solicitor-General, Penang. In 1909, he served as acting Judicial Commissioner, Federated Malay States, and from 1911 to 1913 served as Solicitor-General.

While serving as Solicitor-General, he also acted as temporary Judge of the Supreme Court of the Straits Settlements on several occasions, and in 1913, he was appointed Puisne Judge. During the 1920s, he served as acting Chief Judicial Commissioner of the Federated Malay States, and was elevated to Senior Puisne Judge (1921–1932). In the years 1925, 1926, 1928 and 1931, he was called upon to serve as Chief Justice of the Straits Settlements. He retired in 1933 to Littlehampton, Sussex.

== Personal life and death ==
Sproule married Alice Graburn (OBE) in 1902. They had no children. He was an enthusiastic Freemason serving as District Grand Master of the Eastern Archipelago.

Sproule died on 17 January 1954 in London, aged 80.
