= Dushantha Lakshman Rodrigo =

Right Reverend Dushantha Lakshman Rodrigo
- Bishop of Colombo, Diocese of Colombo, Church of Ceylon
- Church: Anglican
- See: Anglican Diocese of Colombo
- In office: 2020 – present
- Predecessor: Dhiloraj Canagasabey
- Previous posts: Headmaster of S. Thomas' Preparatory School; Chaplain and Acting Warden of S. Thomas' College, Mount Lavinia; Chaplain of Bishop's College, Colombo; Chaplain of S. Thomas' College, Gurutalawa; Vicar of St Michael & All Angels, Polwatte; Vicar of Christ Church, Mutwal; Vicar of St Mary & John, Nugegoda; Vicar of Church Of Ascension Matara

Personal details
- Born: 5 October 1968 (age 58) Trincomalee, Sri Lanka
- Denomination: Anglican
- Residence: 368/3a, Bishops House, Bullers Road (Bauddhaloka Mawatha), Colombo 00700
- Parents: Arthur William Rodrigo; Ruth Adlene De Alwis
- Spouse: Shehara Fernando
- Education: S. Thomas' College, Mount Lavinia; Theological College of Lanka - BDiv; University of Colombo - MDS; Open University of Sri Lanka - PgD.CP

Dushantha Lakshman Rodrigo (born 5 October 1968) is the 16th and current Anglican Bishop of Colombo.

== Early life ==
Dushantha Lakshman Rodrigo was born in Trincomalee on 5 October 1968, the son of Arthur William Rodrigo and Ruth Adlene De Alwis. His parents married at the Jaffna Methodist Church in 1960. His father, Arthur, served in the Sri Lankan Navy.

== Education ==
Rodrigo received his primary and secondary education at S. Thomas' College, Mount Lavinia. He later joined the Theological College of Lanka. He holds a PgD in Counselling and Psychosocial Support from the University of Colombo, and an MA in Development Studies from the Open University of Sri Lanka.

== Ministry ==
Rodrigo also served as a chaplain at several schools, such as S. Thomas' College, Gurutalawa 1995 - 1999, Bishop's College, Colombo 2008 - 2011, S. Thomas' College, Mount Lavinia (He also served as the acting warden) 2011.

He was later appointed the Headmaster of S. Thomas' Preparatory School, from 2015-2020.

Rodrigo was initially an assistant curate at Holy Trinity Church, Nuwara Eliya, and Christ Church Ragala from 1995 - 1996. He was also the vicar at several churches; Church of the Ascension Matara 2000 - 2003, Christ Church Mutwal from 2003 - 2006, St Michael and All Angels Church, Polwatte 2006 - 2011, St Mary & St John Church, Nugegoda from 2012 - 2017, and St. Paul's Church Colombo 2017-2020. In 2020, Rodrigo was installed as the 16th Bishop of Colombo.
