= Michael John Petry =

English philosophy professor

- Born: 9 May 1933; London, England
- Died: 27 March 2003 (aged 69)

Academic background
- Education: Pembroke College, Oxford (DPhil, 1969)
- Thesis: Hegel's Philosophy of Nature with Special Reference to its Mechanics (1969)
- Doctoral advisor: F. C. Copleston

Academic work
- Discipline: Philosophy
- Sub-discipline: History of philosophy
- Institutions: Erasmus University Rotterdam
- Main interests: G. W. F. Hegel

Michael John Petry (/ˈpɛtri/; 9 May 1933 – 27 March 2003) was an English professor of history of philosophy at the Erasmus University Rotterdam.

== Life and work ==
Born in 1931, Petry received his early education at Reading Blue Coat School (1944–1949) and later at Reading School and Pembroke College, Oxford (1949–1952). He earned a B.A. in Modern History in 1955, followed by a Diploma in Education in 1956, and an M.A. in Modern History in 1962. In 1969, he was awarded a DPhil for his dissertation Hegel’s Philosophy of Nature, with Special Reference to its Mechanics, supervised by Father F. C. Copleston.

His academic career began with roles as Lecturer in English Language and Literature at the British Council in Stockholm, Sweden (1953–1960), and at the International People's College in Helsingør, Denmark (1960–1967). He then taught at the University of Bochum, Germany (1970–1974), before becoming Professor of the History of Philosophy at Erasmus University, Rotterdam, Netherlands, a position he held from 1974 until his retirement in 1998.

== Selected publications ==
=== Editorials ===
- Petry, Michael John, ed. (1993). Hegel and Newtonianism. doi:10.1007/978-94-011-1662-6. ISBN 978-94-010-4726-5.
- Petry, Michael John (1987). Hegel und die Naturwissenschaften (in German). Frommann-Holzboog. ISBN 978-3-7728-1146-3.
- Horstmann, Rolf-Peter; Petry, Michael John (1986). Hegels Philosophie der Natur: Beziehungen zwischen empirischer und spekulativer Naturerkenntnis (in German). Klett-Cotta. ISBN 978-3-608-91408-5.

=== Translations ===
- Hegel, Georg Wilhelm Freidrich (1970). Petry, M. J. (ed.). Hegel's Philosophy of Nature (1 ed.). Routledge. doi:10.1201/9781315830322. ISBN 978-1-315-83032-2.
- Hegel, G W F (1970). Hegel's Philosophy of Nature: Volume II Edited by M J Petry (0 ed.). Routledge. doi:10.4324/9781315830315. ISBN 978-1-315-83031-5.
- Hegel, G.W.F. (1970). Petry, M.J. (ed.). Hegel's Philosophy of Nature (0 ed.). Routledge. doi:10.4324/9781315823522. ISBN 978-1-317-83213-3.
- Petry, M. J. (1978). Hegels Philosophie des subjektiven Geistes / Hegel's Philosophy of Subjective Spirit. doi:10.1007/978-94-010-9371-2. ISBN 978-94-010-9373-6.
- Hegel, G. W. F. (1981). Petry, M. J. (ed.). The Berlin Phenomenology/Die Berliner Phänomenologie. doi:10.1007/978-94-009-8387-8. ISBN 978-90-277-1208-0.
- Spinoza, Baruch de (1982-01-01). Algebraische Berechnung des Regenbogens - Berechnung von Wahrscheinlichkeiten: Sämtliche Werke, Ergänzungsband. Zweisprachige Ausgabe (in German). Felix Meiner Verlag. ISBN 978-3-7873-3289-2.

=== Articles ===
- Petry, Michael John (1981). "Hegels Naturphilosophie: die Notwendigkeit einer Neubewertung". Zeitschrift für philosophische Forschung. 35 (3/4): 614–628. ISSN 0044-3301. JSTOR 20483154.

== See also ==
- Arnold V. Miller
