= Reginald Copleston =

English-born Anglican bishop (1845–1925)

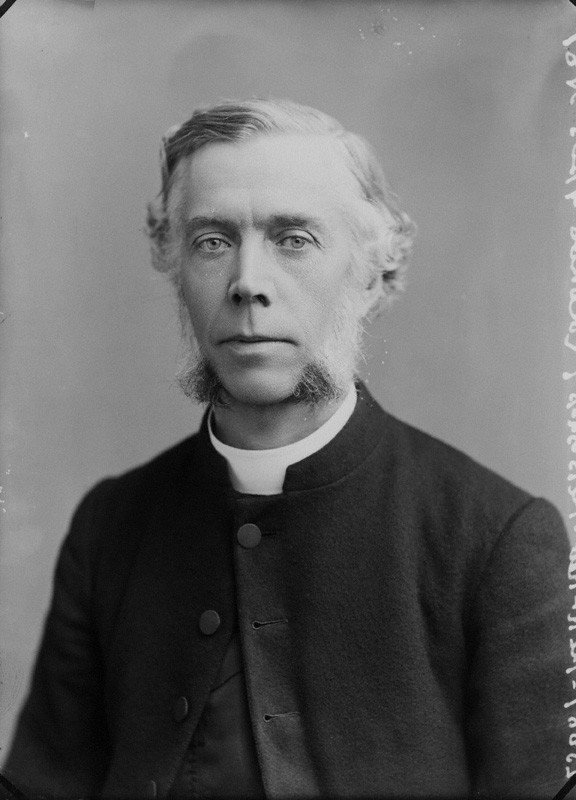
- Reginald Stephen Copleston (1845-1925). Collodion negative by Alexander Bassano, 1895.
- Born: 26 December 1845; Barnes, London, England
- Died: 19 April 1925 (aged 79)
- Occupations: Anglican bishop and author
- Writing career
- Notable works: Aeschylus; Buddhism

Reginald Stephen Copleston (26 December 1845 – 19 April 1925) was an Anglican priest and author who served as a bishop in India for more than 30 years.

== Biography ==
Copleston was born in Barnes, London, the son of Rev. R. E. Copleston, Fellow of Exeter College, Oxford. He was educated at Merchant Taylors' and Merton College, Oxford, where he graduated in 1869. In the same year he was elected to a tutorial fellowship at St John's College, Oxford, and ordained as deacon in 1871. During his time at Oxford he was editor of the Oxford Spectator.

Four years later, in 1875, he was ordained priest and received the degree Doctor of Divinity (DD). Later the same year he was appointed Anglican Bishop of Colombo as one of the youngest prelates to be consecrated bishop, and was occasionally known as the Boy Bishop in the following years. He served in Colombo for 27 years, spending some of his time studying the native religions. In early 1902 he was translated to become Bishop of Calcutta and Metropolitan of India. He arrived in Calcutta on 20 May 1902, and was enthroned at the St. Paul's Cathedral the following day. He held these posts until 1913.

Whilst in Ceylon he served as president of the Ceylon Branch of the Royal Asiatic Society from 1885 to 1901.

== Family ==
Copleston died in London in 1929. He had married, in 1889, Edith Chenevix Trench (1844-1942), daughter of Richard Chenevix Trench, Archbishop of Dublin. They had one son and two daughters

His brother Ernest Arthur Copleston was also an Anglican bishop and his nephew Frederick Copleston was a notable Jesuit priest and philosopher. His brother Frederick Selwyn Copleston, father of Frederick Copleston, was the first Chief Judge of the Chief Court of Lower Burma.

== Publications ==
- Aeschylus (1870), part of the series Ancient Classics for English Readers (William Blackwood and Sons)
- Buddhism (Henry S. King & Co., 1892; republished as Buddhism Primitive and Present in Magadha and in Ceylon, Longmans, 1908; 3rd revised edition published in 1993 as Theravāda Buddhism, Eastern Book Linkers, Delhi, India, ISBN 81-85133-80-8).

Church of England titles
Preceded by Hugh Willoughby Jermyn	Bishop of Colombo; 1875–1902	Succeeded by Ernest Arthur Copleston
Preceded by James Edward Cowell Welldon	Bishop of Calcutta and Metropolitan of India; 1902–1913	Succeeded by George Alfred Lefroy
