= Gurutalawa =

Coordinates: 6°51′N 80°55′E

Gurutalawa (ගුරුතලාව) is a rural town in Sri Lanka. It is located in Badulla District of Uva Province, Sri Lanka.

The famous St. Thomas' College is located in Gurutalawa.

== See also ==
- Towns in Uva
