= Flag and seal of Idaho =

U.S. state flag and seal

State of Idaho
- Use: Civil and state flag
- Proportion: 26:33 (official)
- Adopted: March 12, 1907; 119 years ago (initial version); March 15, 1927; 99 years ago (first modification); March 1957; 69 years ago (second modification)
- Design: A state seal above the words "State of Idaho" in gold letters on a red and gold band on a blue field.

Great Seal of the State of Idaho
- Armiger: State of Idaho
- Adopted: 1891 (modified 1957)
- Motto: Esto perpetua

The seal of the U.S. State of Idaho was adopted in 1863 and redrawn several times before statehood in 1890. The first state Great Seal was designed in the 1890s by Emma Edwards Green, the only woman to design a U.S. state seal. That seal was used until 1957, when the seal was slightly redrawn by Paul B. Evans and the Caxton Printers, Ltd. at the request of the state government, in order to add more anthropocentric elements to the centered shield. The seal depicts a miner and a woman representing equality, liberty and justice. The symbols on the seal represent some of Idaho's natural resources: mines, forests, farmland and wildlife.

The flag of the U.S. state of Idaho was adopted on March 12, 1907, and consists of the state seal on a field of blue. The words "State of Idaho" appear in gold letters on a red and gold band below the seal. According to the official description of the flag, there should also be a fringe of gold around the edges. The official proportions of the flag, 26:33, are unique among flags, although many reproductions use more common ratios like 2:3

== Seal history ==
The current seal contains the text "Great Seal of the State of Idaho" in the outer ring, with the star that signifies a new light in the galaxy of states. The inner ring contains a banner with the Latin motto, Esto perpetua ("Let it be perpetual" or "It is forever"). A woman (signifying justice) and a man (dressed as a miner) support a shield. The miner represents the chief industry of the state at the time of statehood.

Inside, the shield bears images symbolic of the state. The pine tree in the foreground refers to Idaho's immense timber interests. The husbandman plowing on the left side of the shield, together with the sheaf of grain beneath the shield, are emblematic of Idaho's agricultural resources, while the two cornucopias, or horns of plenty, refer to the horticultural. Idaho has a game law, which protects the elk and moose; an elk's head rises above the shield. The state flower, the wild syringa or mock orange, grows tall at the woman's right, while the ripened wheat grows as high as her shoulder. The river depicted in the shield is the Snake or Shoshone River.

In 1957, the seal was slightly redrawn by Paul B. Evans and the Caxton Printers, Ltd. at the request of the state government, in order to add more anthropocentric elements to the centered shield.

=== Historical seals ===
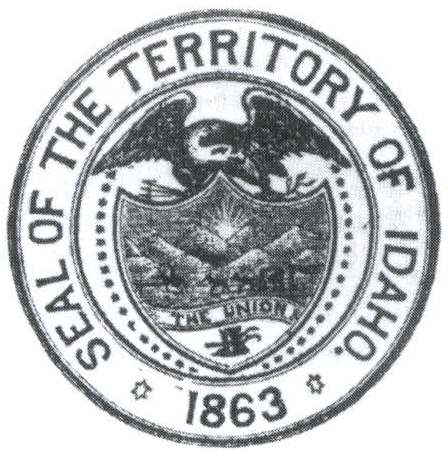
Seal of Idaho Territory 1863–1866

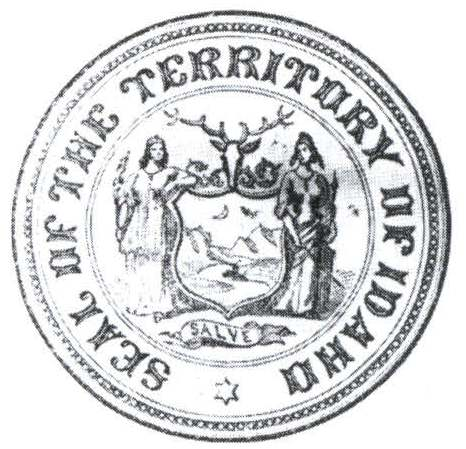
Seal of Idaho Territory 1866–1890

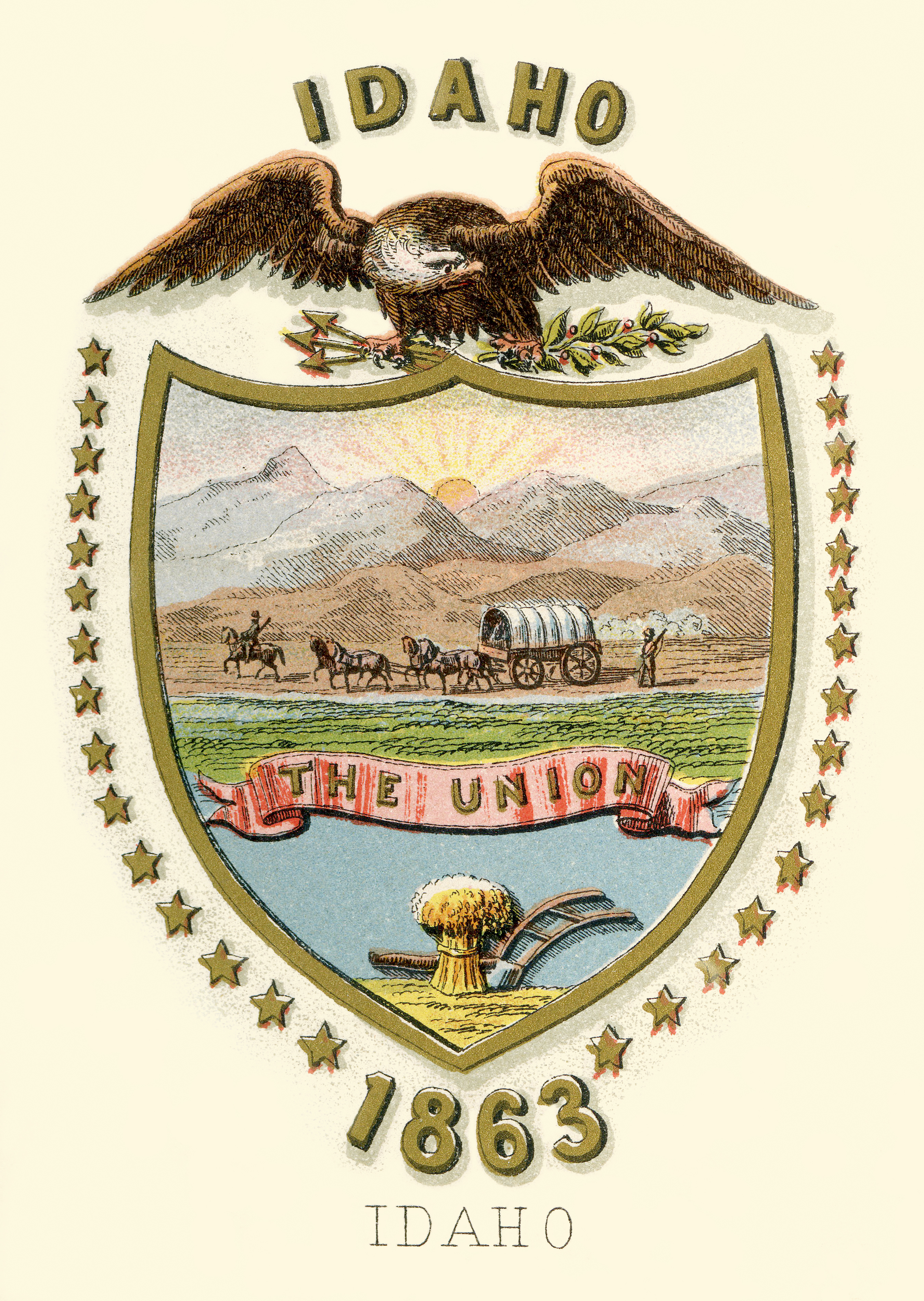
Territorial historical coat of arms (illustrated, 1876)

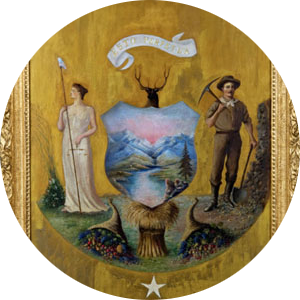
The original 1891 seal as designed by Emma Edwards Green; it was used until 1957.

== Flag statute ==
The 2024 Idaho Code, § 46-801 defines that the flag shall be:

"a silk flag, blue field, five (5) feet six (6) inches fly, and four (4) feet four (4) inches on pike, bordered with gilt fringe two and one-half (2 1/2) inches in width, with state seal of Idaho twenty-one (21) inches in diameter, in colors, in the center of a blue field. The words ‘State of Idaho’ are embroidered in with block letters, two (2) inches in height on a red band three (3) inches in width by twenty-nine (29) inches in length, the band being in gold and placed about eight and one-half (8 1/2) inches from the lower border of fringe and parallel with the same."

== Flag history ==
During much of the 1920s, there was only one known Idaho state flag in existence, designed by the state's adjutant general and in possession of the governor of Idaho, traveling with him as he went abroad.

In 2001, the North American Vexillological Association surveyed its members on the designs of all 72 Canadian provincial, U.S. state and U.S. territorial flags, combined. Idaho finished in the bottom ten, finishing 64th out of the 72.

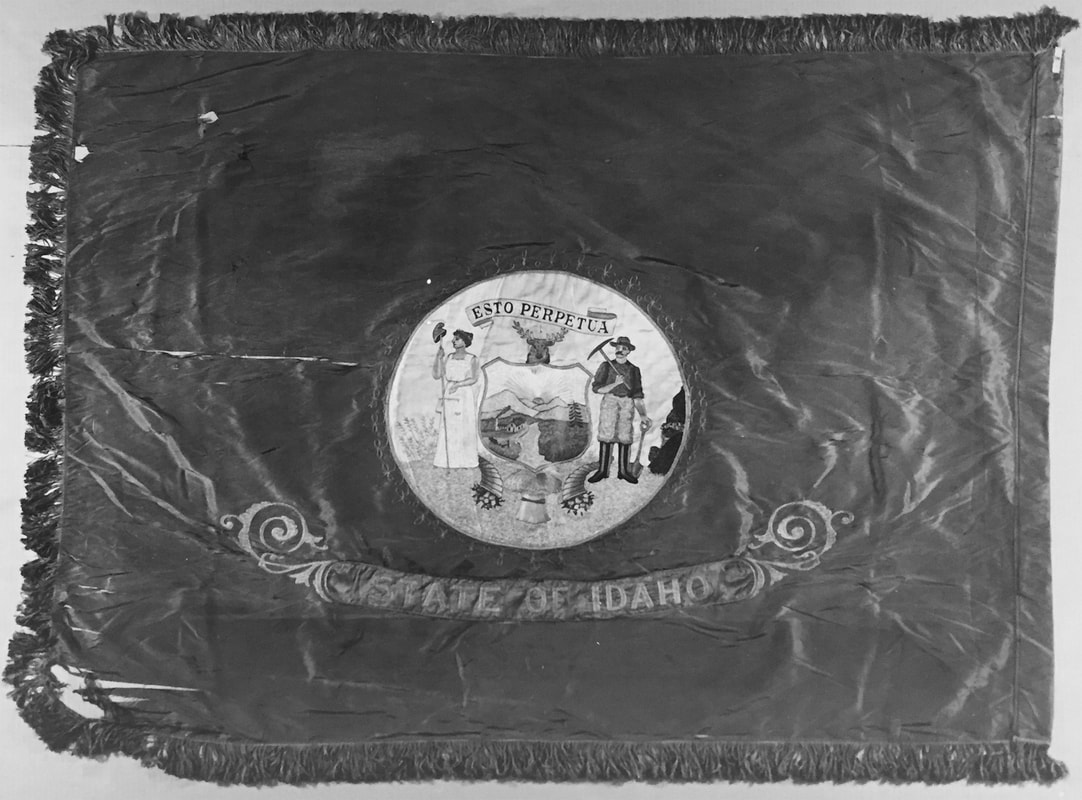
The original Idaho state flag from the 1920s.

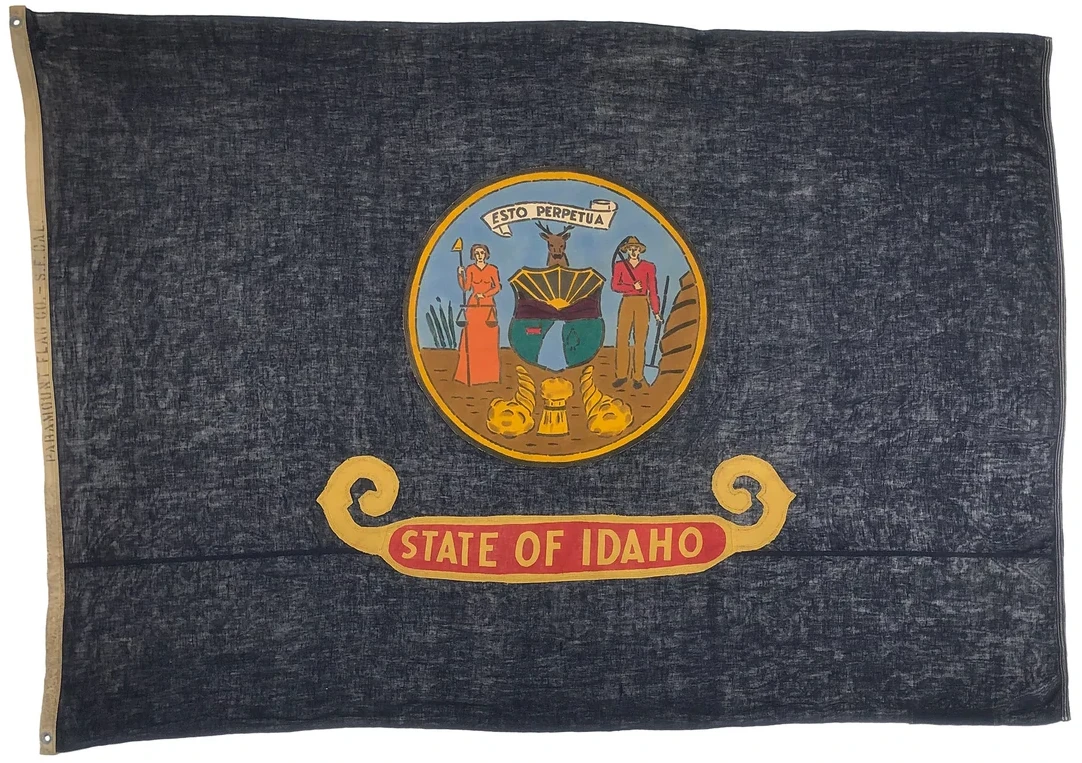
An old Idaho state flag from the 1930s.

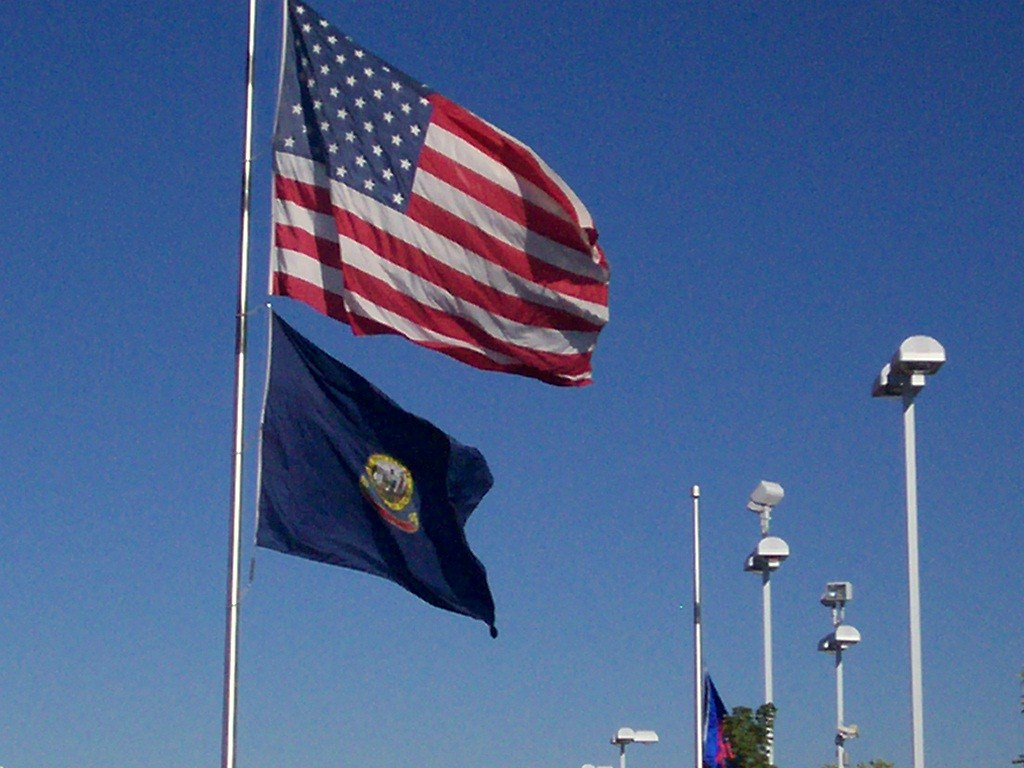
The Idaho flag flying under the U.S. flag.

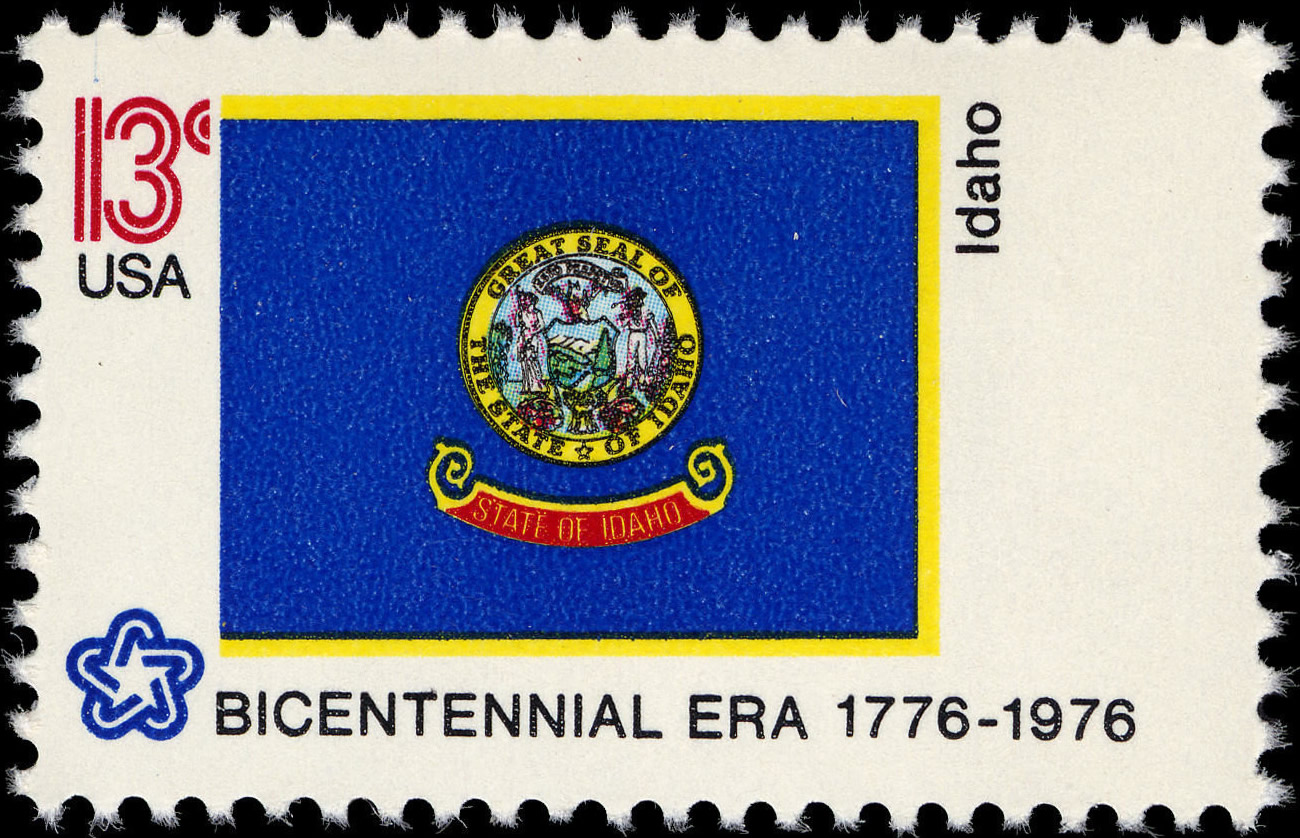
The Idaho state flag as depicted in the 1976 bicentennial postage stamp series.

== Government seals of Idaho ==
Seal of the Idaho Transportation Department

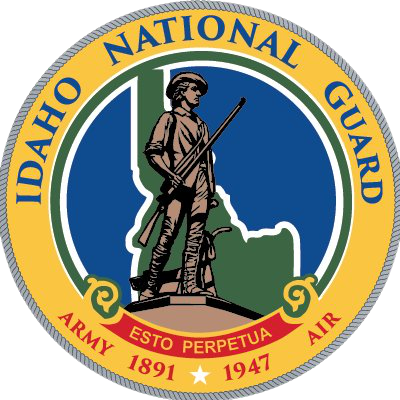
Seal of the Idaho National Guard
