= Daniel Twomey =

British administrator in Burma

Sir Daniel Harold Ryan Twomey (1864 – 28 September 1935) was an Irish-born British colonial administrator and judge in Burma. He was Chief Judge of the Chief Court of Lower Burma from 1917 until his retirement in 1920.

== Biography ==
The son of a Queenstown butcher and ship's chandler, Twomey was educated at St Stanislaus College, Tullamore and University College, London. He joined the Indian Civil Service in 1882, and was appointed a deputy commissioner in Burma in 1890. He was called to the English bar by the Middle Temple in 1895. Twomey was appointed as Secretary to the Government of Burma in 1897, Secretary to the Chief Commissioner in 1899, Acting Chief Secretary in 1901, and Commissioner in 1905. He was also a member of the Legislative Council from 1901.

He was appointed a Judge of the Chief Court of Lower Burma at Rangoon in 1910, and was promoted to be Chief Judge of the Chief Court in 1917, receiving a knighthood the same year. In 1911, he heard the Irish-born monk Dhammaloka's appeal against his conviction for seditious speech. Twomey retired from government service in 1920 and lived in Totnes, England. He was appointed a JP for Devon in 1925.

In 1895, Twomey married May Ponsford, daughter of the Rev. W. Ponsford. Their daughter Phyllis Margaret Twomey (1900–1933) married Gilbert Tew, an ICS officer posted to Burma and was the mother of the leading anthropologist Dame Mary Douglas.
