= Copleston–Russell debate =

Debate between Frederick Copleston and Bertrand Russell

The Copleston–Russell debate is an exchange concerning the existence of God between Frederick Copleston and Bertrand Russell broadcast on the BBC Third Programme on 28 January 1948 and again in April 1959. The debate centers on two points: the metaphysical and moral arguments for the existence of God. According to Graham Oppy and Nick Trakakis, the arguments used in this debate would typify the arguments presented by theists and atheists in the latter half of the 20th century, with Russell's approach often being used by atheists in the late 20th century.

A text of the broadcast solicited by Michael Polanyi appeared in the final Autumn 1948 issue of the short-lived Humanitas, A University Quarterly journal. This was reprinted in the British edition of Russell's Why I Am Not A Christian and Other Essays on Religion and Related Subjects (1957) and in numerous anthologies since.

== Overview ==
In the 1948 BBC Radio Debate between Bertrand Russell and Frederick Copleston, Copleston's position was that God's existence could be proven philosophically. Russell's position was that of an agnostic (in the sense in which both he and Copleston understood the term) as he thought that the non-existence of God could not be proven. Whether Russell was an agnostic or atheist is a question he had previously addressed in 1947. Speaking with fellow philosophers, he had said, he would identify himself as agnostic. But to "the ordinary man in the street" he would identify himself as an atheist as he thought the Christian God no more likely to exist than gods of Ancient Greece and he thought neither "sufficiently probable to be worth serious consideration".

Copleston argued that the existence of God can be proved from contingency, and thought that only the existence of God would make sense of human's moral and religious experience:

First, that the existence of God can be philosophically proved by a metaphysical argument; secondly, that it is only the existence of God that will make sense of man's moral experience and of religious experience. [...] As regards the metaphysical argument, we are apparently in agreement that what we call the world consists simply of contingent beings. That is, of beings no one of which can account for its own existence. You say that the series of events needs no explanation: I say that if there were no necessary being, no being which must exist and cannot not-exist, nothing would exist. The infinity of the series of contingent beings, even if proved, would be irrelevant. Something does exist; therefore, there must be something which accounts for this fact, a being which is outside the series of contingent beings. If you had admitted this, we could then have discussed whether that being is personal, good, and so on. [...] the problem of God's existence is an existential problem whereas logical analysis does not deal directly with problems of existence.

Russell however found both arguments unconvincing. He contended that Copleston's argument from contingency is a fallacy, and that there are better explanations for our moral and religious experience:

First, as to the metaphysical argument: I don't admit the connotations of such a term as "contingent" or the possibility of explanation in Father Copleston's sense. I think the word "contingent" inevitably suggests the possibility of something that wouldn't have this what you might call accidental character of just being there, and I don't think is true except in the purely causal sense. You can sometimes give a causal explanation of one thing as being the effect of something else, but that is merely referring one thing to another thing and there's no—to my mind—explanation in Father Copleston's sense of anything at all, nor is there any meaning in calling things "contingent" because there isn't anything else they could be. [...] I cannot attribute a Divine origin to this sense of moral obligation, which I think is quite easily accounted for in quite other ways.
