= Buddhika Kurukularatne =

Sri Lankan politician (1943–2021)

Hon. Buddhika Kurukularatne
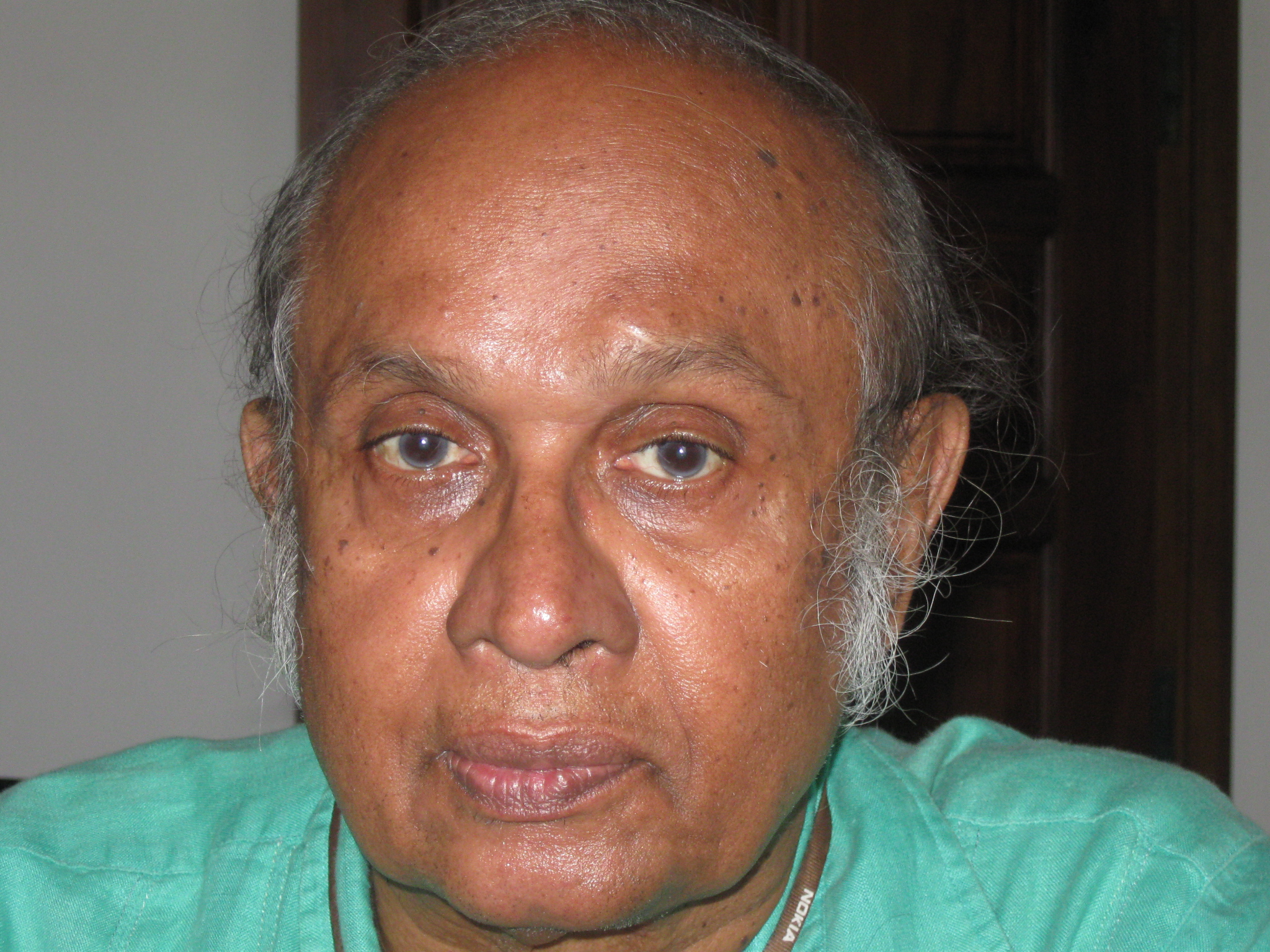

Ex Member of the Sri Lankan Parliament for Galle District

Personal details
- Born: 19 June 1943 Ceylon
- Died: 9 June 2021 (aged 77)
- Party: United National Party
- Spouse(s): Malini Kurukularatne (nee Manikku Wadu)
- Children: Praveena Sharadindu, Udyama Jagatapriya, Dr.Changa Prabhakara
- Education: Maha Ambalangoda Methodist School, Dharmasoka Primary School; St. Thomas' School, Bandarawela, Dharmasoka College, St. Thomas' College, Guruthalawa
- Profession: Lawyer

Daluwatte Hewa Buddhika Kurukularatne (19 June 1943 – 9 June 2021), known as Buddhika Kurukularatne, was a journalist, author, lawyer, and Sri Lankan politician. He served as representative of Galle District for the United National Party in the Parliament of Sri Lanka.

== Early life ==
Buddhika Kurukularatne was born on 19 June 1943 to a well-known family in Ambalangoda; he was the only child of Daluwatte Hewa Henry de Silva Kurukularatne and Manana Hewa Senehelatha Piyaseli of Duwa in Ambalangoda. Kurukularatne had his early education at Maha Ambalangoda Methodist School, Dharmasoka Primary School and St. Thomas' School Bandarawela. Later, he received his secondary education from Dharmasoka College and St. Thomas' College, Guruthalawa.

== Journalist career ==
In 1965 Kurukularatne served as a grade 1 journalist on the editorial staff of the Sun (an English daily) and in 1966 on the editorial staff of the Observer (another English daily). Then he served from 1966 to 1970 in the editorial staff of Virakesari and Janata (a Sinhala daily). There he was in charge of the foreign news page. As a freelance columnist he wrote articles on a regular basis for weekly Sunday English and Sinhala newspapers on his experiences as a parliamentarian in a lighter vein, and his writing was widely read and acclaimed by both government and opposition Sri Lankan parliamentarians. Kurukularatne authored 6 books: 2 in English, 'Student Days 1' and 'Student Days down Memory Lane', and four books in Sinhala which have been approved by the Sri Lanka Ministry of Education as 'Readers'.
