= Frederick Copleston =

British Catholic priest, philosopher, and historian of philosophy (1907–1994)

The Reverend Frederick Copleston SJ CBE FBA
- Copleston in 1987
- Born: Frederick Charles Copleston; 10 April 1907; Trull near Taunton, England
- Died: 3 February 1994 (aged 86); London, England
- Father: Frederick Selwyn Copleston

Education
- Education: Marlborough College; St. John’s College, Oxford; St Mary's College, Oscott

Philosophical work
- Era: Contemporary philosophy
- Region: Western philosophy
- School: Christian philosophy
- Institutions: Heythrop College, University of London
- Doctoral students: Michael John Petry
- Main interests: History of philosophy

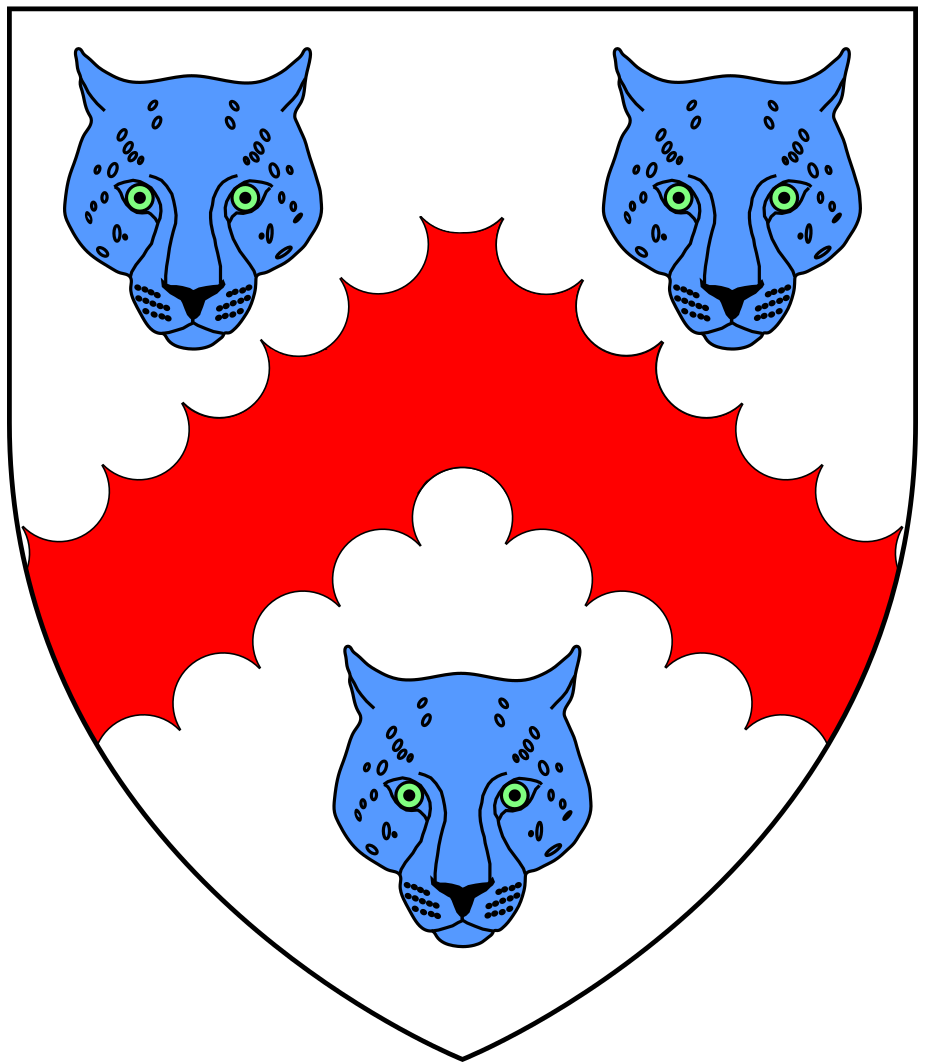
Arms of Coplestone, lords of the manor of Copleston in Devon: Argent, a chevron engrailed gules between three leopard's faces azure

Frederick Charles Copleston (10 April 1907 – 3 February 1994) was a British Catholic priest, philosopher, and historian of philosophy, best known for his influential multi-volume A History of Philosophy (1946–75).

Copleston achieved a degree of popularity in the media for debating the existence of God with Bertrand Russell in a celebrated 1948 BBC broadcast; the following year he debated logical positivism and the meaningfulness of religious language with his friend the analytic philosopher A. J. Ayer.

== Origins ==
Frederick Charles Copleston was born on 10 April 1907 at Claremont in the parish of Trull, near Taunton in Somerset, England, the eldest son of Frederick Selwyn Copleston (1850–1935), a judge of the High Court in Rangoon, Burma, by his second wife, Norah Margaret Little. He was a member of the family of Copleston, lords of the manor of Copleston in Devon until 1659, one of the most ancient in that county according to a traditional rhyme related by John Prince (d.1723):

"Crocker, Cruwys, and Coplestone,
When the Conqueror came were at home"

== Biography ==
He was raised an Anglican—his uncle, Reginald Stephen Copleston, was an Anglican bishop of Calcutta; another uncle, Ernest Copleston, was the Anglican Bishop of Colombo. Copleston was educated at Marlborough College from 1920 to 1925. At the age of eighteen, he converted to the Roman Catholic faith, which caused a great deal of stress in his family. Copleston explained his recognition of the objective authority in the Catholic Church:

"It seemed to me that if Christ was truly the Son of God and if he founded a Church to teach all nations in His name, it must be a Church teaching with authority, as her Master did. Obviously one might deny that Christ was the Son of God, and one might reject the claim that he founded a Church. But if these two claims were accepted, it seemed to me that in spite of all its faults the Roman Catholic Church was the only one which could reasonably be thought to have developed out of what Christ established."

His father, though opposed to his son's becoming a Catholic, helped him complete his education at St John's College, Oxford, where he studied from 1925 to 1929. He graduated from Oxford University in 1929 having managed a third in classical moderations and a good second at Greats. After Oxford, Copleston entered St Mary's College, Oscott as a seminarian for the Diocese of Clifton, but realized the life was not for him.

In 1930, he entered instead the Jesuits. After completing the two-year Jesuit novitiate in Roehampton, he followed the traditional course of studies for the priesthood at the Jesuit house of studies in Heythrop, Oxfordshire and in 1937 he was ordained a Jesuit priest there. In 1938 he travelled to Germany to complete his training, returning to Britain just before the outbreak of war in 1939. Copleston was originally destined to study for his doctorate at the Pontifical Gregorian University in Rome, but the war now made that impossible. Instead, he accepted a posting that saw him return to Heythrop in Oxfordshire to teach the history of philosophy to the few Jesuits remaining there.

From this time onwards, Copleston began writing his influential multi-volume A History of Philosophy (1946–75), a textbook that presents clear accounts of ancient, medieval, and modern philosophy. Still highly respected, Copleston's history has been described as "a monumental achievement" that "stays true to the authors it discusses, being very much a work in exposition".

Copleston achieved a degree of popularity in the media for debating the existence of God with Bertrand Russell in a celebrated 1948 BBC broadcast (see Copleston–Russell debate). The following year he debated logical positivism and the meaningfulness of religious language with his friend the analytic philosopher A. J. Ayer.

Throughout the rest of his academic career, Copleston accepted a number of prestigious titles, including visiting professor at Rome's Gregorian University, where he spent six months each year lecturing from 1952 to 1968. In 1970 the Jesuit Heythrop house of studies was relocated to London, where as Heythrop College it became a constituent part of the federal University of London. Copleston became the new college's respected principal and gave undergraduate courses. His uncontestable mastery of his material immediately won the confidence and respect of the students, who were drawn from among younger Jesuits and junior religious from male and female religious orders, and some lay men and women. Moreover, his affable manner, dry humour and unfailing courtesy made him popular. In that same year 1970, he was made Fellow of the British Academy (FBA), and in 1972 he was given a personal professorship by the University of London. In 1975, he was made an Honorary Fellow of St. John's College, Oxford.

After officially retiring in 1974, he continued to lecture. From 1974 to 1982, Copleston was visiting professor at the University of Santa Clara, California, and from 1979 to 1981, he delivered the Gifford Lectures at the University of Aberdeen, Scotland, which were published as Religion and the One. These lectures attempted to "express themes perennial in his thinking and more personal than in his history". Toward the end of his life, Copleston received honorary doctorates from a number of institutions, including Santa Clara University, California, Uppsala University, and the University of St Andrews.

Copleston was offered memberships in the Royal Institute of Philosophy and in the Aristotelian Society. In 1993 he was made CBE. Father Frederick Copleston died on 3 February 1994 at St Thomas' Hospital in London, at the age of 86.

== Legacy ==
In addition to his influential multi-volume History of Philosophy (1946–75), one of Copleston's most significant contributions to modern philosophy was his work on the theories of Saint Thomas Aquinas. He attempted to clarify Aquinas's Five Ways (in the Summa Theologica) by making a distinction between in fieri causes and in esse causes. By doing so, Copleston makes clear that Aquinas wanted to put forth the concept of an omnipresent God rather than a being that could have disappeared after setting the chain of cause and effect into motion.

== Works ==
- A History of Philosophy (1946–1975)

Other select works

- Friedrich Nietzsche: Philosopher of Culture (1942), expanded edition; (1975)
- Arthur Schopenhauer: Philosopher of Pessimism (1946)
- Medieval Philosophy (1952), revised edition: A History of Medieval Philosophy (1972)
- Aquinas (1955), reprinted from 1976 as Thomas Aquinas,
- "Logical Positivism - A Debate" (with A. J. Ayer) in: Edwards, Paul, Pap, Arthur (eds.), A Modern Introduction to Philosophy (1957)
- Contemporary Philosophy: Studies of Logical Positivism and Existentialism (1956), republished with a new first chapter in 1972
- Religion and Philosophy (1974)
- Philosophers and Philosophies (1976)
- On the History of Philosophy and Other Essays (1979)
- Philosophies and Culture (1980)
- Religion and the One: Philosophies East and West (1982)
- Philosophy in Russia: From Herzen to Lenin and Berdyaev (1986)
- Russian Religious Philosophy (1988)
- Memoirs of a Philosopher (1993)

Related works

Hughes, Gerard J. (1987) The Philosophical Assessment of Theology: Essays in Honour of Frederick C. Copleston
