= S. Thomas' College, Gurutalawa =

Coordinates: 6°50′38″N 80°54′05″E

- Gurutalawa, Welimada; Sri Lanka

Information
- Type: Private
- Motto: Latin: Esto Perpetua (Be Thou Forever)
- Religious affiliation: Christianity
- Denomination: Anglican
- Established: 12 May 1942; 84 years ago
- Founder: R. L. Hayman
- Principal: U. U. K. Laksiri S. Perrera
- Gender: Male
- Education system: National Education System
- Houses: Reed; Garnier; De Saram; Hayman
- Colors: Dark blue and black
- Song: Thomian Song
- Alumni: Old Thomians
- Brother Schools: S. Thomas' College, Mount Lavinia; S. Thomas' Preparatory School; S. Thomas' College, Bandarawela
- Website: https://www.stcguru.edu.lk

S. Thomas' College, Gurutalawa (abbreviated as STCG), is a fee-levying Anglican selective entry boys' private school located in Gurutalawa, in the Uva Province of Sri Lanka. The college was founded as a private school by Dr. R. L. Hayman, the longest serving sub warden of S. Thomas' College, Mount Lavinia, in 1942. The college is administered by the Church of Ceylon.

== Administration ==
The college forms a branch of S. Thomas' College, Mount Lavinia, which is under the Anglican Church of Ceylon, is run by a Board of Governors which is chaired by the Anglican Bishop of Colombo, who is also known as the "Visitor of the College". The administration of the college is headed by a headmaster, who is an Anglican priest.

== History ==
S. Thomas' College, Gurutalawa was founded by Dr. R. L. Hayman in 1942, as a branch of S. Thomas' College, Mount Lavinia. A farm with some land and buildings was donated to the college by Leslie de Saram and his wife.

Due to the Japanese war threats to Colombo, during World War II, the State Council decided in February 1942 to close all schools in the Colombo District. There were over 700 boys at S. Thomas' College, Mount Lavinia and as the Warden explored possibilities of opening branches inland, Leslie De Seram made the generous offer of their 18-hectare (45-acre) farm at Gurutalawa.

== Current status ==
The college is a fully fledged school catering to extra-curricular activities with a swimming pool and has facilities for nearly all sports including athletics, cricket, basketball, rugby, volleyball, squash, soccer, table tennis, hockey, badminton, swimming as well as activities like scouting, hiking and trekking. There is also the encouragement for a variety of societies and clubs, debating, oratory, oriental dancing and music.

== Headmasters ==
| No. | Name of Headmaster | Years Served | |
| No. | Name of Headmaster | From | To |
|---|---|---|---|
| 1. | W. R. L. Hayman | 1942 | 1945 |
| 2. | C. H. L. Davidson | 1946 | 1947 |
| 3. | W. R. L. Hayman | 1948 | 1962 |
| 4. | A. J. Foster | 1963 | 1964 (Acting) |
| 5. | A. K. Chapman | 1965 | (Acting) |
| 6. | K. Dassanayake | 1965 | (Acting) |
| 7. | F. Jayasinghe | 1965 | 1968 |
| 8. | E. L. Perera | 1968 | 1974 |
| 9. | M. L. C. Ilangakoon | 1975 | 1977 |
| 10. | S. C. H. De Silva | 1977 | 1981 |
| 11. | E. St. P. Gunawardene | 1982 | 1987 |
| 12. | J. De S. Jayasinghe | (Acting) | |
| 13. | J. B. Gunasegaram | 1988 | 1989 |
| 14. | H. C. Goodchild | 1989 | 1990 (Acting) |
| 15. | C. B. Ratnayake | 1990 | 1997 |
| 16. | L. A. M. Chandrasekera | 1997 | 1999 (Acting) |
| 17. | I. A. Fernando | 1999 | 2001 |
| 18. | G. C. Mendis | 2001 | 2003 |
| 19. | E. G. J. Canagasabey | 2004 | 2006 |
| 20. | J. Huyghebaert | 2007 (Acting) | |
| 21. | N. M. P. Billimoria | 2007 | 2012 |
| 22. | Nihal Fernando | 2012 | 2017 |
| 23. | S. P. Nesakumar | 2018 | 2022 |
| 24. | U. U. K. Laksiri S. Perrera | 2023 | present |

== Notable alumni ==
- Bradmon Weerakoon - Civil Servant and served as the Secretary to the several Prime Ministers of Sri Lanka (Such as Sir.John Kotelawala, Solomon Bandaranaike, Wijayananda Dahanayake, Sirimavo Bandaranaike, Dudley Senanayake, Ranasinghe Premadasa, Dingiri Banda Wijetunga, Chandrika Kumaratunga & Ranil Wickremesinghe)
- General Ranjan Wijeratne - Former Cabinet Minister of Foreign Affairs, Minister of State for Defense
- Revd. Dr. Lakshman Wickremasinghe - Bishop in the Church of England and Human Rights activist
- Buddhika Kurukularatne - Former Member of Parliament, Attorney at Law, social worker and author
- Sarath Muttetuwegama - Former Member of Parliament for Kalawana Seat, Ratnapura District
- Ananda Kumarasiri - Current Deputy Speaker of the Sri Lankan Parliament, Current member of the Sri Lankan Parliament for Wellawaya Seat, Monaragala District
- Keerthi Thennakoon - Former Governor of the Central Province of Sri Lanka, Former Governor of the Southern Province of Sri Lanka
- Jagath Pushpakumara - Former Minister of Coconut Development and Janatha Estate Development, Former Non-Cabinet Minister of Nation Building and Estate Infrastructure Development, Former Deputy Minister of Plantation Industries, Agriculture, Social Services, Samurdhi, Poverty Alleviation, Mahaweli Development, Livestock Development, Estate Infrastructure and Former Member of the Sri Lanka Parliament for Wellawaya Seat, Monaragala District
- Dr.Frank de Silva - 24th Sri Lankan Inspector General of Police (IGP)
- Ananda Dassanayake - Former Governor of the Uva Province of Sri Lanka & Former Member of the Sri Lanka Parliament
- Clifford Ratwatte - Former Member of Parliament for Balangoda Seat, Former Parliamentary Secretary to the Minister of Agriculture, Food, Co-operatives and Fisheries, Former Chairman of the State Plantations Corporation and the Sri Lanka Tea Board & The younger brother of Late Prime Minister of Ceylon, Sirimavo Bandaranaike Ratwatte
- Nalanda Ellawala - Former Member of parliament for Ratnapura District & Former Member of Sabaragamuwa Provincial Council
- Keheliya Rambukwella - Current Member of the Sri Lanka Parliament for Kandy District, Former Minister of Mass Media and Information, Former Member of The United National Party
- Sasi Mahendran – Judge of the Court of Appeal since 2021
