= Frederick Selwyn Copleston =

British Indian civil servant

Frederick Selwyn Copleston (1850–1935) was a member of the Indian Civil Service. He was the Chief Judge of the Chief Court of Lower Burma from 1900 to 1902.

== Biography ==
Copleston was the son of Rev. R. E. Copleston, Fellow of Exeter College, Oxford and Vicar of Edmonton. He was a member of the Copleston family, lords of the manor of Copleston in Devon until 1659. Reginald Stephen Copleston, Bishop of Calcutta and Ernest Arthur Copleston, Bishop of Colombo were his brothers.

After education at Marlborough College, Copleston joined the Indian Civil Service in July 1873 and arrived in India in October 1873, when he was appointed Assistant Magistrate and Collector in Allahabad. He volunteer for service in Burma the following year and was posted there an Assistant Commissioner, and held various offices before being appointed Judicial Commissioner of Lower Burma in 1898. When the Court of the Judicial Commissioner was replaced in April 1900, Copleston was appointed the first Chief Judge of the Chief Court of Lower Burma.

He retired in April 1902 and returned to England. According to his family, he had been asked by Lord Curzon to serve as Lieutenant-Governor of Burma, but refused, whereupon Curzon struck off his name from the honours list. In retirement he was a Justice of the Peace for Somerset.

== Family ==
Copleston married in 1883 Elizabeth Colley of Clontarf, of Dublin; she died in 1895. He married secondly in 1902 Norah Margaret Little, daughter of Colonel Colhoun-Little, MD, IMS; they had two sons, one of whom was the Jesuit philosopher and theologian Frederick Charles Copleston.
