= Walter Allen Robinson =

Walter Allen Robinson (7 December 1839 – 11 June 1895) was a British administrator who was appointed the first Principal of Aitchison College, Lahore, then in British India, on 20 November 1886.

Robinson was born in Hoton, Leicestershire, to Rev. Charles Walter Robinson and his wife, Martha Maddock. He was survived by his son, Sir Sydney Maddock Robinson, the Chief Justice of Burma and a daughter who was married in late April 1895, two months before her father died at 3 p.m. on 11 June 1895 from a sun stroke. He is buried in the Taxalie Gate cemetery in Lahore, Pakistan.
