= Sydney Maddock Robinson =

British administrator in Burma

Sir Sydney Maddock Robinson (3 December 1865 – 17 May 1948) was a British barrister and colonial judge who served as Chief Justice of the High Court of Burma from 1922 to 1925.

The son of Walter Allen Robinson, Sydney Robinson was educated at Hereford Cathedral School and Brasenose College, Oxford. He was called to the Bar at the Middle Temple in 1888, then practised at Lahore. He was appointed Public Prosecutor, Lahore in 1891, and then successively Junior Government Advocate, Government Advocate, Legal Remembrancer to the Punjab Government, and Secretary to the Punjab Legislative Council.

He was appointed Judge of the Chief Court of Lower Burma in 1908 and became Chief Judge in 1920. On the creation of a separate High Court for Burma in 1922, Robinson was appointed as its first Chief Justice, having been knighted earlier that year. He retired in 1925.
