= Coplestone Bampfylde =

Coplestone Bampfylde may refer to:

- Sir Coplestone Bampfylde, 2nd Baronet (c. 1633–1692), English MP for Tiverton and for Devon 1671–1679 and 1685–1689
- Sir Coplestone Bampfylde, 3rd Baronet (c. 1689–1787), his grandson, British MP for Exeter and Devon 1713–1727
- Coplestone Warre Bampfylde (1720–1791), British painter and landscaper
