= Ernest Copleston =

Ernest Arthur Copleston (1855 – 24 August 1933) was an Anglican bishop in the first half of the 20th century.

He was born in Barnes, Surrey, the fourth son of Rev. Reginald Edward, vicar of Barnes, fellow of Exeter College, Oxford, and Anne Elizabeth née Sharpe. Copleston was educated at St John's College, Oxford and ordained in 1878. His career began with curacies at St Luke's Church, Maidenhead and St. Paul's Church, Kandy. On 18 August 1883 he was appointed the incumbent at the Holy Emmanuel Church, Moratuwa, together with St Peter’s Church, Koralawella, and then Principal of the Diocesan Training College, Kandy until 1903. On 30 August 1903 he was consecrated as the fifth Anglican Bishop of Colombo at St. Paul's Cathedral, Calcutta. A position in which he served for 21 years, until he was replaced by Mark Carpenter-Garnier in 1924.

His brother Reginald Stephen Copleston was also an Anglican bishop, whilst another brother, Frederick Selwyn Copleston, was the first Chief Judge of the Chief Court of Lower Burma. His nephew Frederick Copleston, son of Frederick Selwyn Copleston, was a notable Jesuit priest.

Church of England titles
Preceded by Reginald Stephen Copleston	Bishop of Colombo; 1903 – 1924	Succeeded by Mark Rodolph Carpenter-Garnier
