= Emma Edwards Green =

American painter (1856–1942)

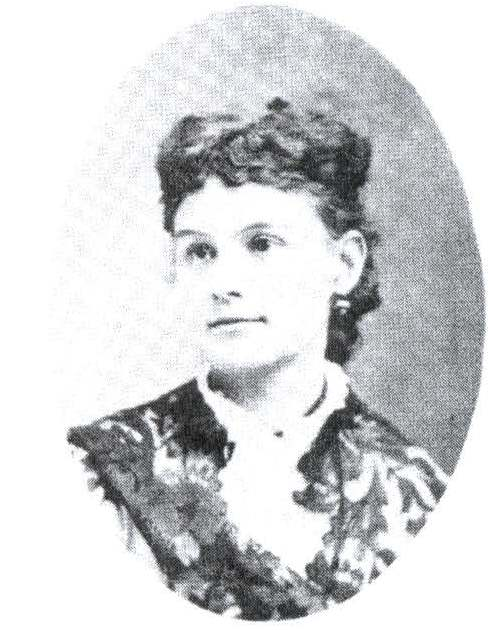
- Photo date unknown, before 1902
- Born: 1856; Stockton, California, United States
- Died: January 6, 1942 (aged 85–86); Boise, Idaho, United States
- Known for: Designing the first state seal of Idaho
- Spouse: James G. Green

Emma Edwards Green, born Emma Sarah Etine Edwards (1856–1942), later known as Mrs. Emma Green, was an American painter and designer. She designed the original State Seal of Idaho that was used from 1891 to 1957, a modified version of which is also used on the flag of Idaho. She is the only woman to have designed a state seal.

== Biography ==
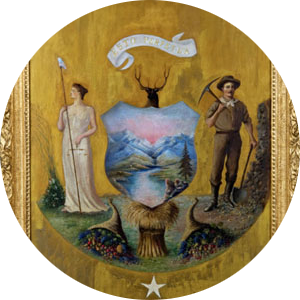
The original state seal of Idaho as designed by Green and adopted in 1891; it was used until 1957.

Emma Edwards Green was born Emma Sarah Etine Edwards in 1856 to Emma Jeanne Catherine Richard and former Missouri Governor John Cummins Edwards in Stockton, California. In 1890, Emma Edwards Green stopped in Boise, Idaho, to visit friends on her way home from the Arts Students League of New York. She decided to stay in Boise and began teaching art classes. In 1891, Edwards was invited to submit a design for the State Seal competition sponsored by the First Legislature for the State of Idaho. On May 5, 1891, Edwards was awarded $100 by Governor N. B. Willey for her design of the state seal, which depicts a miner, a woman and various natural resources of Idaho. The original seal painting is now held at the Idaho State Historical Society.

A few years after designing the State Seal of Idaho, Edwards married James G. Green. She had no children, but assisted in raising her nephews. Emma Edwards Green died in Boise, Idaho, on January 6, 1942, and was buried with her husband in Oakland, California.
