= R. L. Hayman =

Dr. R. L. Hayman MBE
- Born: 1902; Clapham Great Britain
- Died: 1983 (aged 80–81); Bournemouth United Kingdom
- Education: Wychwood Preparatory School, Sherbourne School, University of Oxford
- Occupations: Teacher, Educationist, Lay Missionary
- Employer(s): S. Thomas' College, Mt Lavinia
- Known for: Founder of S.Thomas' College Gurutalawa, The Longest serving Sub warden of S Thomas College, Mount Lavinia and benefactor to the College
- Title: Dr

William Rollo Lenden Hayman, Sub Warden of S. Thomas' College Mt Lavinia and Founder Headmaster of S Thomas' College Gurutalawa, was a teacher known for being a founder and benefactor to education in Sri Lankan Anglican Schools. He was appointed a MBE for his services to education.

== Early life and family ==
William Rollo Lenden Hayman was born on 14 December 1902 at Clapham, South London the son of William Hayman a doctor of Medicine. The Hayman family moved to Brighton and then to Bournemouth. Hayman went to Wychwood Preparatory School and between 1914 – 1918 was a boarder at Sherborne School in Dorset. He left Sherbourne to attend Oxford University where he read Physics and stayed on to complete a PhD. He then trained as a teacher in North London for ministry in the Anglican Church in Ceylon.

== S. Thomas’ College ==
Hayman came to Ceylon through the offices of Society for the Propagation of the Gospel. His services were first sought by Trinity College, Kandy but he eventually joined the staff of S.Thomas' College, Mt. Lavinia in 1929. Hayman served as Sub Warden from 1935-1957 (with R. S. de Saram) and is the longest serving sub warden in the school's history. He is credited with founding a branch of the College at Gurutalawa, initiating Scouting at S Thomas' College, donating a swimming pool and the Fives Courts to the College (now converted into a basketball ball court near the lower school block).

Warden K. C. McPherson (Warden 1926-1930) wrote of the recruitment of Dr Hayman and his generosity as a benefactor to the college as

"In the year 1928 I went to England on short leave, and while I was there I met four men (Dr R. L. Hayman, Rev. A. J. Foster, Rev J. G. Elliot, and W. T. Keble) who wanted to return with me to Ceylon; they came and subsequently became members of the staff. One was Rollo Hayman, Doctor of Science of Oxford, who gave many years of devoted service and who also made some generous gifts to the College, notably the Swimming Bath and I believe, the Fives Courts.". Hayman met Mary Rudd a military nurse who was hiking from the army camp in Diyatalawa and they were married in England in 1945. On their return Mrs Hayman assumed duties as Matron of the sick room.

== Honours ==
Hayman returned to England in 1963 and was appointed a MBE in the New Year Honours List in 1964. His citation lists him as late Headmaster of S Thomas College Gurutalawa and not as sub-warden of S Thomas College Mt Lavinia. The annual water polo match between Royal and S Thomas is played for the RL Hayman trophy.

Hayman died in Bournemouth on the night of 7 May 1983 survived by his wife Mary who died at the age of 94 on 17 November 2008. Mrs Hayman's bequest to the college was invested in the Hayman Foundation in memory of Dr and Mrs Hayman. The commemorative plaque at the entrance to the Science laboratory he donated reads "To spend and be spent in the service of others was his greatest privilege".
