= S. Thomas' College, Bandarawela =

S. Thomas’ College, Bandarawela
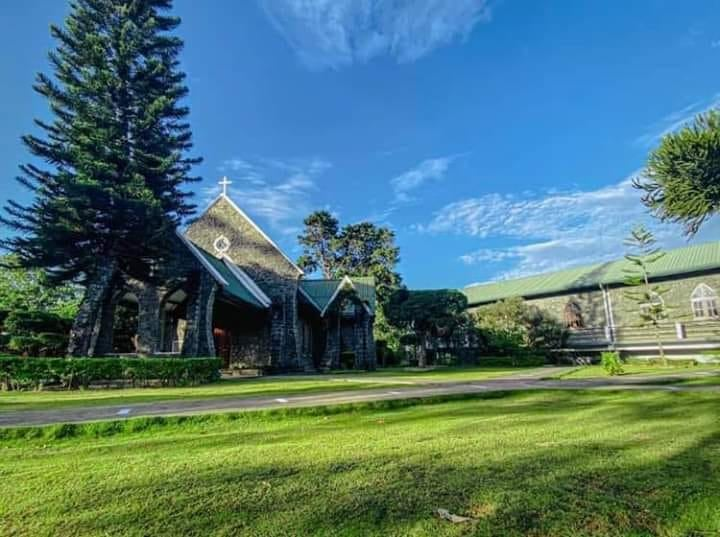
- College Chapel

Location
- S. Thomas' College Bandarawela, Uva, Sri Lanka
- Coordinates: 6°50′45″N 80°58′46″E

Information
- Type: Private School
- Motto: Latin: Esto Perpetua (Be Thou Forever)
- Religious affiliation: Christianity
- Denomination: Anglican
- Established: 20 January 1942; 84 years ago
- Founder: W. T. Keble
- Headmaster: Palitha Navaratne
- Grades: 1 - 13
- Gender: Male
- Education system: National Education System
- Language: English, Sinhala, Tamil
- Houses: Keble; Hulugalla; De Saram; Hayman
- Colors: Dark blue and black
- Song: Thomian Song
- Alumni: Old Thomians
- Brother Schools: S. Thomas' College, Mount Lavinia; S. Thomas' Preparatory School; S. Thomas' College, Gurutalawa
- Website: stcb.edu.lk

S. Thomas' College, Bandarawela is a selective entry boys' private school, situated in the town of Bandarawela in the Uva Province, Sri Lanka. It is an Anglican school administrated by the Church of Ceylon.

The college is run by a Board of Governors which is chaired by the Anglican Bishop of Colombo, who is also known as the Visitor of the College. The administration of the college in itself is headed by a headmaster who is an Anglican priest. Admission to the college is at the sole discretion of the headmaster.

== History ==
S. Thomas' Preparatory School in Bandarawela was founded by W. T. Keble on 20 January 1942. Keble had originally conceived the idea of establishing an upcountry school as early as 1929, following a visit to Nuwara Eliya. However, he ultimately selected Bandarawela as the ideal location, owing to its favourable climate.

In 1957, V. D. Paul Raj assumed the role of headmaster and oversaw the completion of the chapel of the Good Shepherd in 1960. Under successive leadership, the college attained junior secondary school status in 1969 and later progressing to senior secondary school status in 1975. In 1981, it was renamed S. Thomas’ Collegiate School, and in 1989 was renamed to S. Thomas’ College.

The most recent headmaster is P. H. Navarathna, who was appointed in 2023.

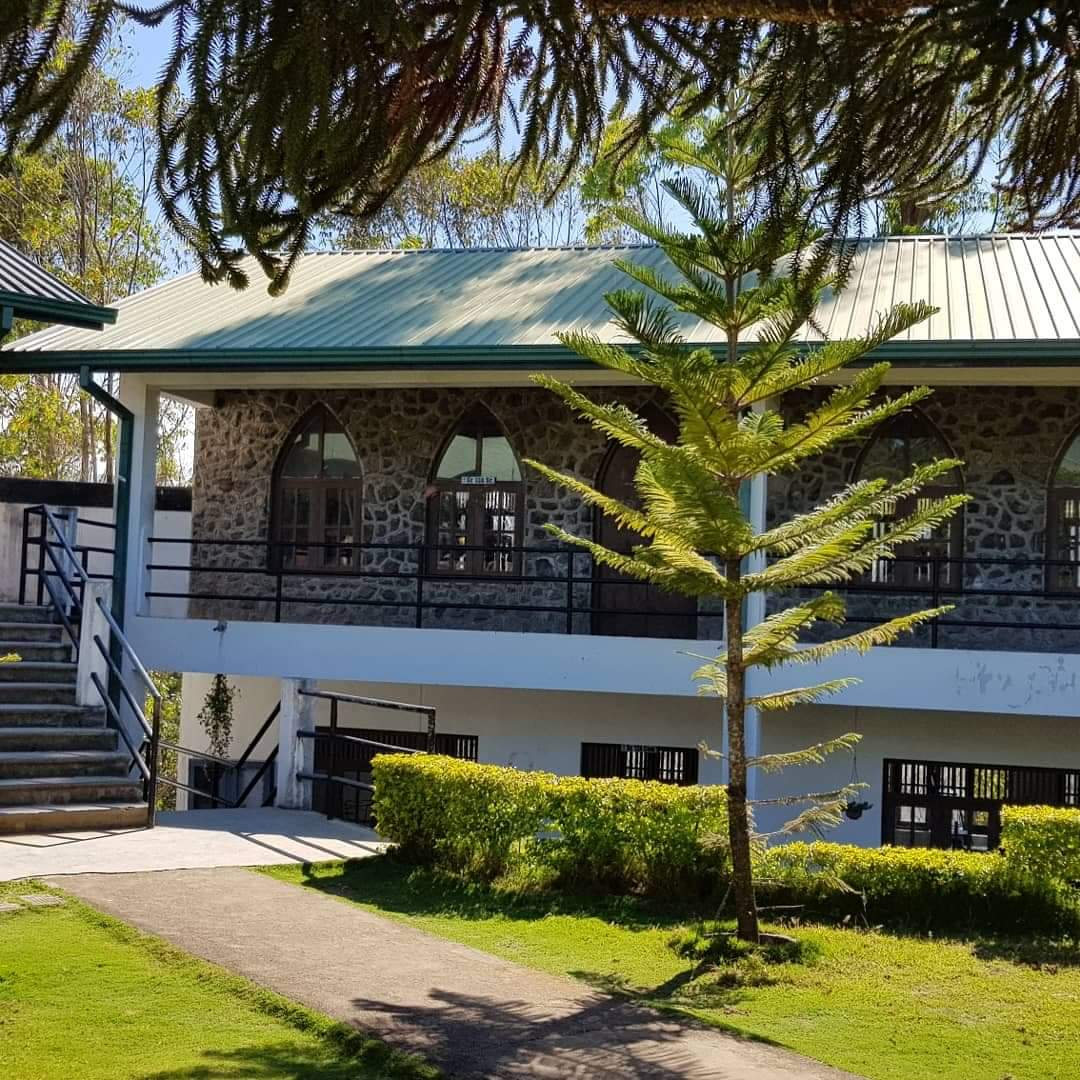
Advanced Level Classroom Complex

== Sports ==
=== Uva Thomian Cricket Encounter ===
This annual cricket encounter between S. Thomas' College, Bandarawela and S. Thomas' College, Gurutalawa, both being part of the Thomian family, was started in 1984. The fixture was abandoned in 1987 due to a number of reasons. The fixture was resumed after the idea was mooted by the OBA of STC Bandarawela supported by the OBA of STC Gurutalawa and the two Headmasters agreed to continue the ‘Uva Thomian Cricket Encounter’ (UTCE) on a grand scale in 2009. The match is played for a trophy to commemorate the two headmasters of Bandarawela and Gurutalawa who were responsible for starting the fixture; S. L. A. Ratnayake and Patrick Gunawardene.

=== W. T. Keble Memorial Soccer Tournament ===
This annual inter-school W. T. Keble Memorial Soccer Tournament takes place between S. Thomas' College, Bandarawela and S. Thomas' Preparatory School, Kollupitiya, both being part of the Thomian family.

== Past headmasters ==
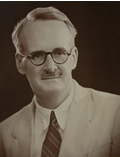
W. T. Keble M. A. (Oxon), Founder of the College

List of Past Headmasters of S. Thomas' College, Bandarawela
No.	Name	From	To
1.	W. T. Keble	1942	1956
2.	V. D. Paul Raj	1957	1964
3.	S. L. A. Ratnayake	1964	1985
4.	D. B. Welikala	1985	1989
5.	R. R. R. Herathge	1989	2000
6.	L. A. M. Chandrasekera	2000	2013
7.	Christopher Balraj	2015	2022
8.	P. H. Navarathna	2023	present

== Old Boy's Association ==
The Old Boys' Association (OBA) of S. Thomas' College Bandarawela was founded in 1977 during the tenure of S. L. A. Ratnayake. The Colombo branch was inaugurated in 1990, and the two entities were later amalgamated, with the central body now functioning from Colombo.

== See also ==
- List of schools in Sri Lanka
