= Mark Carpenter-Garnier =

Carpenter-Garnier in 1924.

The Rt Rev Mark Rodolph Carpenter-Garnier (1 January 1881 – 11 October 1969) was an Anglican bishop in the first half of the 20th century.

== Life and career ==
Born in Wickham, Hampshire on New Year's Day, he was the third son of John Carpenter Garnier and Hon. Mary Louisa Trefusis, daughter of Charles Trefusis, 19th Baron Clinton. His eldest brother, John Trefusis Carpentier-Garnier, was killed in action in the First World War. He was educated at Winchester and Oriel College, Oxford and ordained in 1905. His career began with curacies at St Thomas, Portman Square and All Saints, Margaret Street. Following this he was Librarian of Pusey House, Oxford. From 1924 to 1938 he was Anglican Bishop of Colombo. He then returned to England to be Principal of St Boniface Missionary College, Warminster and then Chaplain of Salisbury Diocesan Training College.

In 1940, he married Eveline Egerton-Warburton, daughter of Piers Egerton-Warburton and granddaughter of Rowland Egerton-Warburton.

Church of England titles
Preceded by Ernest Arthur Copleston	Bishop of Colombo; 1924 – 1938	Succeeded by Cecil Douglas Horsley
