= Chief Justice of Myanmar =

Chief judicial officer of Myanmar

This is a list of chief justices of the Union of Myanmar and its predecessor offices.

== History ==
After the British conquest of Burma, there were initially a Judicial Commissioner of British Burma (later Judicial Commissioner of Lower Burma) and a Judicial Commissioner of Upper Burma. In 1900, the Judicial Commissioner of Lower Burma was replaced by a Chief Judge of the Chief Court of Lower Burma. In 1922, a unified High Court was established at Rangoon, headed by a Chief Justice of the High Court of Judicature at Rangoon. During the Japanese occupation of Burma, the State of Burma also appointed a Chief Justice of the Supreme Court.

At independence, the 1947 Constitution of Burma established a Supreme Court, headed by a Chief Justice of the Union, as well as a High Court, headed by a Chief Justice of the High Court. Following the 1962 Burmese coup d'état, both courts were replaced by a Chief Court, headed by a Chief Judge of the Chief Court (which was later changed to Chief Justice of the Chief Court in English, but not in Burmese). In 1974, the Chief Court was abolished and replaced with a Council of People's Justices, headed by a Chairman of the Council of People's Justices. Since 1988 there has been a Chief Justice of the Union. Under the 2008 Constitution of Myanmar, each High Court of a region or of a state also has its own Chief Justice.

In 2016, lawyers and activists were pressing for the creation of a Ministry of Justice (which has never existed in Myanmar's history) in order for the government to elect a Chief Justice rather than the President.

== List of chief justices of Myanmar ==
Chief Judge of the Chief Court of Lower Burma (1900–1922)

- 1900–1902: Frederick Selwyn Copleston
- 1902–1905: Sir Herbert Thirkell White
- 1905–1906: Sir Harvey Adamson
- 1906–1917: Sir Charles Edmund Fox
- 1917–1920: Sir Daniel Harold Ryan Twomey
- 1920–1922: Sir Sydney Maddock Robinson

Chief Justice of the High Court of Judicature at Rangoon (1922–1948)

- 1922–1925: Sir Sydney Maddock Robinson
- 1925–1930: Sir John Guy Rutledge
- 1930–1936: Sir Arthur Page
- 1936–1948: Sir Ernest Handforth Goodman Roberts

Chief Justice of the Supreme Court (1943–1945?)

- 1943–?: Sir Mya Bu

Chief Justice of the Union (1948–1962)

- 1948–1952: Sir Ba U
- 1952–1957: U Thein Maung
- 1957–1962: U Myint Thein

Chief Justice of the High Court (1948–1962)

- 1948–1950: U Thein Maung
- 1950–1954: U Tun Byu
- 1955–1961: U Chan Tun Aung
  - 1958–1959: U San Maung (senior judge performing the duties of the chief justice)
- 1961–1962: U Yan Aung

Chief Judge (or Chief Justice) of the Chief Court (1962–1974)

- 1962–1965: U Bo Gyi
- 1965–1972: U Maung Maung
- 1972–1974: U Hla Thinn

Chairman of the Council of People's Justices (1974–1988)

- 1974–1981: U Aung Pe
- 1981–1982: U Maung Maung Kyaw Win
- 1982–1988: U Tin Aung Hein

Chief Justice of the Union

- 1988–2011: U Aung Toe
- 2011–2023: U Htun Htun Oo
- 2023 - Present: Tha Htay
