= Battle of the Blues (Colombo) =

Annual school cricket competition in Sri Lanka between Royal and S. Thomas'

- Countries: Sri Lanka
- Format: Test and One-Day
- First edition: 1879; 147 years ago
- Latest edition: 2025
- Next edition: 12–14 March 2026
- Number of teams: Royal College, Colombo; S. Thomas' College, Mount Lavinia
- Current champion: S. Thomas' College
- Most successful: Royal College (36 titles); S. Thomas' College (36 titles)
- 146th Battle of the Blues

The Battle of the Blues (also known as Royal–Thomian Cricket Encounter) is an annual Big Match in Sri Lanka played between Royal College, Colombo and S. Thomas' College, Mount Lavinia since 1879. It is known as The Battle of the Blues due to the colours of the two school's flags i.e. blue, gold and blue of Royal College and blue, black and blue of S. Thomas' College.

== History ==
The original match was played between the Colombo Academy and S. Thomas' College, Mutwal in 1879, with schoolmasters and schoolboys participating. Mr. Ashley Walker captained the Colombo Academy while Rev. S. J. Meyrick, a member of the staff played for S. Thomas' College, Mutwal. This encounter is not considered the first match as Masters played for both sides.

In 1880, only the students took part and this first official encounter between the Colombo Academy and S. Thomas' College, Mutwal in Modara was played at Galle Face Grounds, which is today the site of the Taj Samudra Hotel. The match commenced at 4.00 p.m. each day. The Beira Lake stretched up to the present railway line close to San Sebastian Hill and the two teams rowed across in boats to the Galle Face Grounds. The Academy made 110 in the first inning; and S. Thomas' 59. In the second innings the Academy made 35 and St. Thomas' 24. J. W. de Silva was the Academy captain and F. W. McDonnell the Thomian captain. In this first encounter Colombo Academy won by 62 runs.

At present, the match is played between Royal College, Colombo which is a public non-denominational school accommodating approximately 8,500 students and S. Thomas' College, Mt Lavinia which is a private Anglican school that has about 2500 boys on roll and a branch network of three constituent colleges with a total of over 5,500 students. It was the first schoolboy cricket match in Sri Lanka to be played over three days.

The Royal-Thomian is the second-longest uninterrupted Cricket series in the entire world, preceded only by the Cricket Intercol played between Prince Alfred College, Adelaide and St. Peter's College, Adelaide, whose first match was played in 1878.

== Shield ==
This match is played for the prestigious D. S. Senanayake Memorial Shield. Incidentally, Rt. Hon. D. S. Senanayake, who became the first Prime Minister of Independent Ceylon, donned the Thomian cap in 1901 and 1902. This shield was first presented in 1928. If a match is drawn then the school already holding the shield retains it. S. Thomas' College is the current holder of the shield after winning the 146th Battle of the Blues in 2025.

== Atmosphere ==
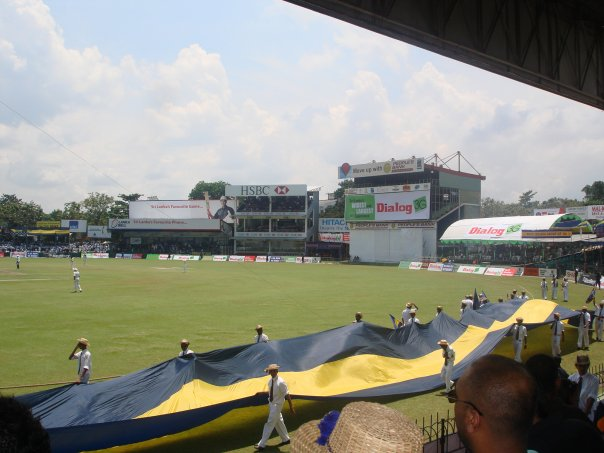
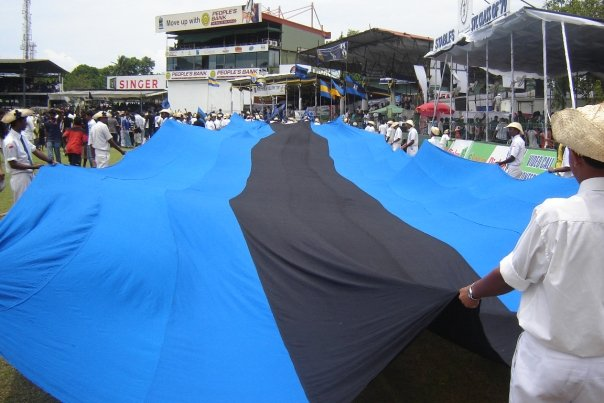
- Top: Royal flag at the 128th Royal-Thomian.
- Bottom: Thomian flag at the 129th Royal-Thomian.

The "Battle of the Blues" is filled with pageantry, with decorated tents, flags and baila singing and dancing groups present all around the city and the ground itself during the match days and in the days leading up to it. The match is held on a Thursday, Friday and Saturday. By tradition, the schools are closed on match days to allow students to attend the Big Match. Souvenirs published by both the schools are sold on all three days, the duty of distribution entrusted to the souvenir committees. On the day before the match, the students of each school take a walk around the city in a "cycle parade" with bands and decorations and other colourful items showing support for their team. Overloaded cars with supporters singing and careering along the Colombo streets is a familiar sight during match days.

The match is popular and widely attended. It is an occasion for the alumni and present students of both schools to come together for three days of revelry. It is normal to see elderly alumni from either school coming to the "Big Match" to relive old times and meet old friends. Some expatriates choose this time of year to return to Sri Lanka in order to relive their old school days.

== Venues ==
- Galle Face Grounds (Home of Colombo Cricket Club) - 1880, 1882 to 1891, 1893, 1894, 1897, 1899, 1912
- Gordon Gardens - 1881
- Nomads Cricket Club (NCC) Grounds, Victoria Park - 1892
- CCC Grounds, Maitland Crescent - 1895 to 1896, 1898, 1900 to 1911
- Campbell Park - 1913 to 1915, 1917
- NCC Grounds, Maitland Crescent - 1916, 1935, 1936, 1937, 1939, 1941
- Sinhalese Sports Club (SSC) Grounds, Victoria Park (current NCC grounds) - 1918 to 1934, 1938, 1940, 1942, 1944, 1946, 1948
- Colombo Oval - 1943, 1945, 1947, 1949 to 1974, 1977, 1978, 1980, 1983, 1984, 1986 to 1988, 1991, 1992, 1993
- SSC Grounds, Maitland Place - 1975, 1976, 1979, 1981, 1982, 1985, 1989, 1990, 1994 to Present

== Results of the last encounter ==
147th three-day match

12–14 March 2026
Report

S. Thomas'	v	Royal
302 (124.1 overs); R. Solomons 66 (146); S. Sooryaarachchi 3/58 (21.5 overs)		261/9d (86 overs); R. Perera 82 (126); G. Mendis 4/60 (20 overs)
176/6 (55.4 overs); J. Amaraweera 100* (161); M. Kodithuwakku 2/5 (6 overs)

Match drawn
SSC Grounds, Colombo

- Royal won the toss and elected to field.

49th limited overs match

21 March 2026

S. Thomas'	v	Royal

TBD
SSC Grounds, Colombo

== Notable people who have played in the Royal Thomian Cricket Match ==
Royalists

- J.R. Jayawardene
- Sir John Lionel Kotalawela
- Sir Forester Obeysekera
- N.S. Joseph
- R. L. de Krester
- B. R. Heyn
- B. W. Bawa
- P. B. Bulankulame
- Eran Wickramaratne
- Ranjan Madugalle
- Gamini Goonesena
- Churchill Gunasekara
- Fredrick C. de Saram
- Satyendra Coomaraswamy
- Donald Rutnam
- Basil Gunasekara
- Muhammad Ajward Macan Markar
- Asantha De Mel
- Sudath Pasqual
- Jayantha Amerasinghe
- Rohan Jayasekera
- Roshan Jurangpathy
- Jehan Mubarak
- Pradeep Jayaprakashdaran
- Kithruwan Vithanage
- Kushal Janith Perera
- Bhanuka Rajapaksa
- Lasith Embuldeniya
- Chamika Karunaratne

Thomians

- D. S. Senanayake
- Dudley Senanayake
- Vernon Prins
- Michael Tissera
- Anura Tennekoon
- Buddy Reid
- Mano Ponniah
- Bradman Weerakoon
- Duleep Mendis
- Guy de Alwis
- Aruna Gunawardene
- Saliya Ahangama
- Kaushik Amalean
- Kapila Wijegunawardene
- Johanne Samarasekera
- Nisal Fernando
- Jeewan Mendis
- Kaushal Silva
- Stanley Tambiah
- S. Saravanamuttu
- P. Saravanamuttu
- M. Saravanamuttu
- Mevan Pieris
- Ranil Abeynaike
- Shantha Kottegoda
- Michael Jayasekera
- A. F. Molamure

== See also ==
- Big Match
- Royal–Thomian rivalry
- Royal Thomian Regatta
