= Saravanamuttu =

Saravanamuttu is a surname. Notable people with the surname include:

- Dipti Saravanamuttu (born 1960), Sri Lankan-Australian poet
- Manicasothy Saravanamuttu (died 1970), Sri Lankan journalist
- Naysum Saravanamuttu (1897–1941), Ceylonese politician
- Paikiasothy Saravanamuttu (1892–1950), Ceylonese civil servant
- Ratnasothy Saravanamuttu (born 1886), Ceylon Tamil politician
- Sabdharatnajyoti Saravanamuttu (1898–1957), Ceylon Tamil lawyer
