= Royal College Rowing Club =

- Home water: Beira Lake, Colombo
- Founded: 1953
- Membership: Students of Royal College Colombo
- Affiliations: Colombo Rowing Club
- Website: http://www.royalcollegerowing.org

Events
- Royal Thomian Regatta

The Royal College Rowing Club is the rowing club of the Royal College Colombo, Sri Lanka. It uses the facilitates of the Colombo Rowing Club since its inception in 1953 as the first school rowing team in Ceylon. The Royal College rowing team annually competes in the Royal Thomian Regatta which takes place at the Beira Lake.

== History ==
Royal was the first school to start its own rowing program in 1953 with the formation of the Royal College rowing squad. Its first regatta was lead at the Beira Lake against the B team (all European) of the Colombo Rowing Club in which the Royalist won the coxed fours. Soon after another regatta was won against an all European team from Madras Boat Club, the first colours for rowing were awarded.

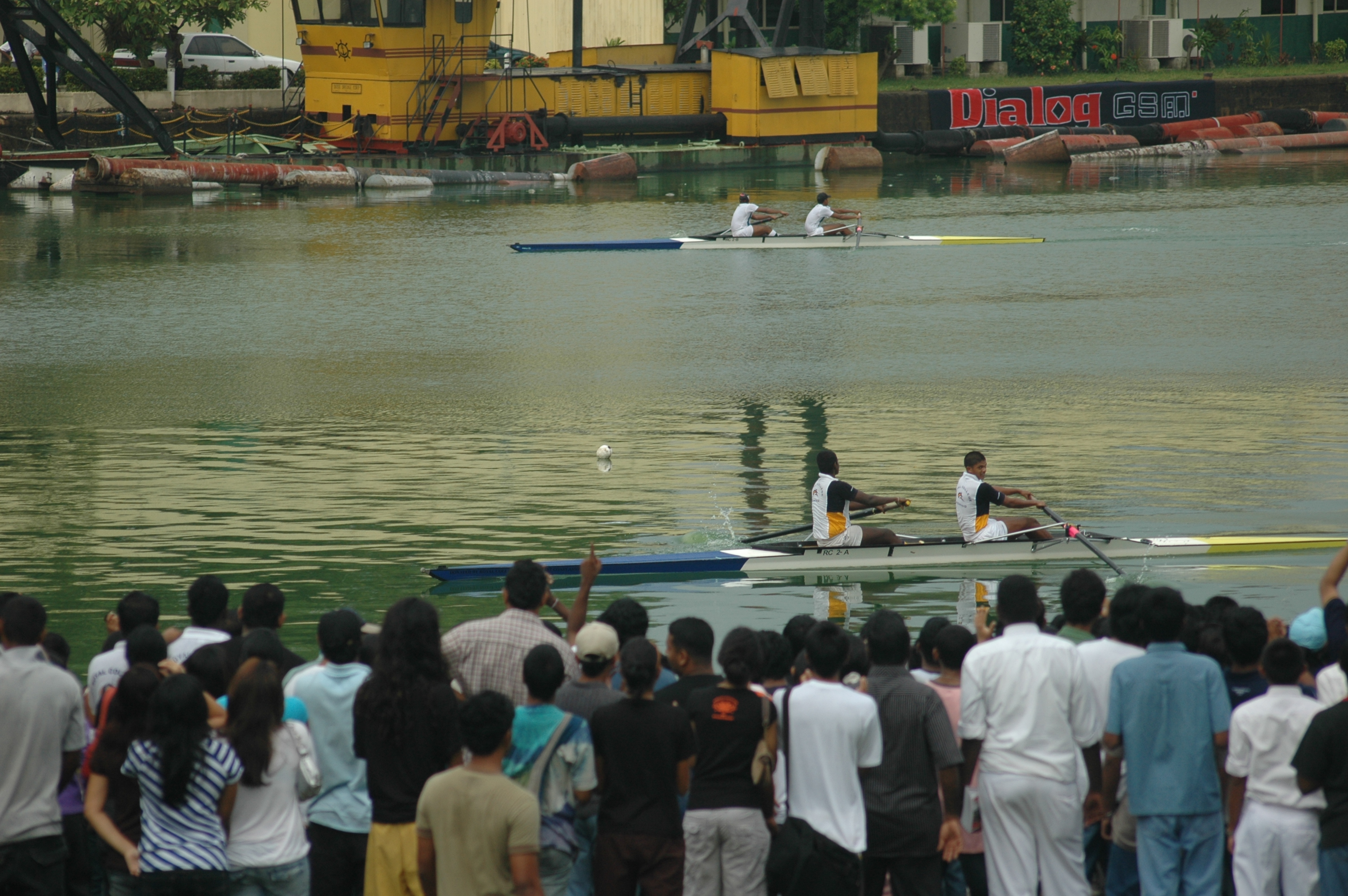
Royal (nearside) winning the Junior Pairs 2007 in a record time.

In 1962 a coxed fours event began against Royal' traditional rivals S. Thomas' College, Mt Lavinia. By 1966, it broadened out to give rise to the regatta having a card of six events, made up of two single sculls, two coxless pairs and two coxed fours. This marks the start of the Royal Thomian Regatta which is the oldest inter-school rowing regatta in Sri Lanka, awarding the Royal Thomian Boat Race Trophy (also known in the rowing fraternity as the 'Crossed Oars') for the boat race, which is regarded as the most prestigious race, and T. Noel Fernando Memorial Trophy for the overall winner of the regatta.

== See also ==
- The Boat Race
