= De Kretser =

De Kretser is a surname. Notable people with the surname include:

- David de Kretser (born 1939), Australian medical researcher
- Michelle de Kretser (born 1957), Australian novelist
- Oswald Leslie De Kretser II (1882–1959), Ceylonese judge
- Oswald Leslie De Kretser III, Ceylonese judge
- R. L. de Kretser (born 1920–?), Sri Lankan cricketer
