= Oswald Leslie De Kretser =

Oswald Leslie De Kretser may refer to:

- Oswald Leslie De Kretser II, Ceylonese Judge
- Oswald Leslie De Kretser III, Ceylonese Judge
