= Bertram Heyn =

Deshabandu Bertram Russell Heyn
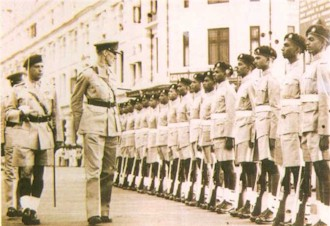
- Guard of Honor for Brigadier Roderick Sinclair, 19th Earl of Caithness, held by Major B.R. Heyn
- Born: October 1, 1912
- Died: February 3, 1998 (aged 85)
- Military career
- Allegiance: Sri Lanka
- Branch: Ceylon Defence Force; Ceylon Army
- Service years: 1940–1946; 1949–1967
- Rank: Major General
- Service number: O/50074
- Unit: Ceylon Light Infantry
- Commands: Army Commander, Chief of Staff, 1st Battalion, Ceylon Light Infantry
- Conflicts: World War II
- Awards: War Medal 1939–1945
- Other work: President of the Board of Control for Cricket in Sri Lanka

Major General Deshabandu Bertram Russell Heyn (October 1, 1912 – February 3, 1998) was a Sri Lankan general and cricketer. He was a former Commander of the Ceylon Army.

== Early life and education ==
Born to Gerald Chetwynd Swartz Heyn and Hylda Heyn (nee de Zilva), he had nine siblings and was educated at Royal College, Colombo.

== Cricketing career ==
He played for the cricket team at Royal College, debuting in 1930 and played in the Royal-Thomian. He played for the Ceylon cricket team and his most famous feat was getting Sir Donald Bradman out on his last appearance in Colombo, in a one-day match between Australia and All-Ceylon on 27 March 1948. Bradman was able to score only 20 runs before being caught out by R.L. de Kretser off Heyn's bowling. Heyn also played hockey and rugby.

== Military career ==
=== Ceylon Defence Force ===
He joined the Ceylon Defence Force and was commissioned as a second lieutenant in the Ceylon Light Infantry on the 1st September 1940 before its expansion due to World War II. He resigned his commission as a Major on the 9 Apr 1948

=== Ceylon Army ===
When the Ceylon Army was formed in 1949, he was commissioned as a major in the regular force. From February 1955 to November 1959, he served as the commanding officer of the 1 Battalion, Ceylon Light Infantry having been promoted to the rank of lieutenant colonel. He graduated from the Staff College, Camberley, and the Imperial Defence College.

==== Higher command ====
Promoted to the rank of colonel he was serving as Chief of Staff of the Army, when, in January 1962, a military coup was attempted by senior military and police officers. Unaware of the coup, Colonel Heyn was on the list of those to be detained by the troops involved in the coup. With Colonel Maurice de Mel, the Commandant, Ceylon Volunteer Force and Colonel F. C. de Saram, Deputy Commandant; implicated and arrested, Heyn was appointed Commandant, Ceylon Volunteer Force and began restructuring regiments involved in the coup as majority were volunteer regiments. Colonel A.R. Udugama succeeded Heyn as Chief of Staff. In January 1964, when the Army Commander Major General H.W.G. Wijeyekoon was forced to retire, he was succeeded by Colonel Udugama who was below Heyn in the army seniority list. Given that the officers connected to the attempted coup were all Christian, Prime Minister Sirima Bandaranaike had preferred appointing Udugama over the more senior Heyn, given that the former was a Buddhist and kinsmen from a Kandyan Radala family.

==== Army commander ====
In July 1966, Major General Udugama was suspended and arrested under emergency regulations following allegations of attempting to stage a coup against the government of Prime Minister Dudley Senanayake. Colonel Heyn, who was acting army commander in Major General Udugama's absence abroad, continued until he was confirmed as army commander on 11 November 1966 with the promotion to the rank of brigadier. He was later promoted to the rank of major general and held the post until his retirement on 30 September 1967.

=== Decorations ===
His medals include the Defence Medal, the War Medal 1939–1945 and the Queen Elizabeth II Coronation Medal.

== Later life ==
In his later years he managed the Sri Lanka cricket team and served as the head of the Cricket Board, as well as on the Sri Lanka Olympic Council. He was the President of the Burgher Recreation Club from 1965 to 1976. In 1990, the Government of Sri Lanka awarded Heyn the title of Deshabandu, the third highest Sri Lankan national honour, for meritorious service.

== Family ==
Heyn married Edna May Johnson, daughter of Harry Johnson and Edith Maria Wood of Staines in Middlesex at the Dutch Reformed Church, Bambalapitiya on 25 October 1941. They had two sons Richard Russell and Peter David. Richard represented Sri Lanka (then Ceylon) at Field Hockey and played Cricket at top-grade club level. David represented Sri Lanka at Cricket and played Field Hockey at top-grade club level.

Military offices
Preceded by Richard Udugama	Commander of the Sri Lankan Army; 1966–1967	Succeeded by D. S. Attygalle
