= Richard Udugama =

Sri Lankan army commander (1911–1995)

Hon. Major General Deshamanya Alexander Richard Udugama රිචඩ් උඩුගම MBE

Member of Parliament for Matale
- In office 7 June 1970 – 18 May 1977
- Preceded by: Alick Aluwihare
- Succeeded by: Alick Aluwihare

Personal details
- Born: 11 November 1911 Matale, British Ceylon
- Died: 14 May 1995 (aged 83)
- Party: Sri Lanka Freedom Party
- Occupation: Soldier
- Awards: Burma Star, Defence Medal, War Medal 1939–1945

Military service
- Allegiance: Sri Lanka
- Branch/service: Ceylon Defence Force; Ceylon Army
- Years of service: 1940–1946, 1949–1966
- Rank: Major General
- Unit: Ceylon Light Infantry
- Commands: Army Commander, Chief of Staff, Garrison Commander, Troops Jaffna, 1st Battalion, Ceylon Light Infantry
- Battles/wars: World War II

Major General Deshamanya Alexander Richard Udugama, MBE (11 November 1911 – 14 May 1995) was a Sri Lankan soldier, politician and diplomat. Former Army Commander (1964–1966), he was elected as Member of Parliament for Matale from 1970 to 1977 and served as Sri Lankan Ambassador to Iraq from 1979 to 1982. He was accused of an alleged coup d'état in 1966.

== Early life ==
Born on 11 November 1911 in Matale to a Kandyan radala family, who claimed to be linked to the Uva Rebellion. His father was W. A. Udugama Disawe a local headmen and his mother was Loku Kumarihamy, he had five siblings. Udugama was educated at Trinity College, Kandy, where he won the Trinity Lion for rugby. Following his schooling at Trinity College, he became a school teacher.

== Military career ==
=== World War II ===
With the outbreak of World War II, he joined the Ceylon Light Infantry and was commissioned as a Second Lieutenant in 1940 with the wartime expansion of the regiment within the Ceylon Defence Force. Thereafter, he served in the 1st, 3rd and 4th Battalions of the Ceylon Light Infantry and undertook several infantry courses in Ceylon and India. He was promoted to the temporary rank of Captain on 1 January 1943. In November 1943, he was transferred to the British 14th Army operating in the Burma Campaign on secondment with the British Army. There he served with the 7th Battalion, 2nd Punjab Regiment which was under the 7th Indian Infantry Division in Arakan, on the eastern side of Mayu Range. During the Arakan campaign, he was captured by the Japanese and held in a POW camp until the end of the war in 1945. After the war, he was demobilised and returned to work as a school teacher.

=== Ceylon Army ===
With the formation of the Ceylon Army in 1949, he transferred to the regular force with the rank of Major in the 1st Battalion, Ceylon Light Infantry which was briefly named the Ceylon Infantry Regiment. He also served as the Chief Security Officer of the Ceylon Government Railway from 1949 to 1951. He then served as the Army Recruiting Officer and Commanded the Recruit Training Depot. In 1956, he was serving as the Garrison Commander, Diyatalawa when he was dispatched to Ampara after communal rioting broke out with a detachment of Ceylon Light Infantry to assist the police to subdue the riots. Later he served as the Coordinating Officer for Batticaloa. Promoted to lieutenant colonel, he served as the commanding officer of the 1st Battalion, Ceylon Light Infantry from November 1959 to November 1962. In February 1961, he was dispatched to Jaffna with the 1st Battalion, after the Federal Party launched a Satyagraha against the language policy of the government. The government having declared a state of emergency under the Public Security Act had Udugama break up the protest and arrest its leaders. Establishing a command headquarters, in the Jaffna Kachcheri, Udugama now promoted to the rank of colonel, was appointed Garrison Commander, Troops Jaffna in command of all army units in the Jaffna District which included the Ceylon Light Infantry and the Ceylon Sinha Regiment to ensure that the civil unrest by the Federal Party was stopped. He remained in Jaffna until February 1962, when he was recalled to Colombo to take up the post of Chief of Staff of the army following an attempted coup d'état by senior army and police officers.

=== Army Commander ===
Although not connected to the attempted coup, Army Commander Major General H.W.G. Wijeyekoon was forced to retire by the government of Prime Minister Sirima Bandaranaike on 31 December 1963. Bandaranaike appointed Udugama to succeed Wijeyekoon with the promotion to the rank of Brigadier on 1 January 1964. Brigadier Udugama became the first Sinhalese Buddhist and combat experienced officer to be appointed as Army Commander. Given that the officers connected to the attempted coup were all Christian, Bandaranaike had preferred appointing Udugama over the more senior Colonel Bertram Heyn, given that he was a Buddhist and kinsmen from a Kandyan Radala family. He increased the intake of Buddhist officers to the army and increased the focus on jungle warfare training, having established links with Yugoslavia. He also encouraged sports within the army. He was later promoted to the rank of Major General.

=== Alleged 1966 attempted coup d'état ===
In June 1966, Major General Udugama was on an official tour in Europe, visiting military training schools in the United Kingdom, France, Germany, and Switzerland. While in the United Kingdom, he was visited by the Director of the Criminal Investigation Department who questioned him on an investigation that was carried out about a possible attempt coup d'état against the government of Prime Minister Dudley Senanayake in what was known as the Bathroom coup. Shortly thereafter he was recalled to Ceylon via a coded message from the Ministry of External Affairs and Defence. On 7 July 1966, the BOAC aircraft carrying him landed at the Bandaranaike International Airport and he was met by Air Commodore Rohan Amerasekera, who escorted him to the officers mess of RCyAF Katunayake under guard where the Inspector General of Police John Attygalle presented a detention order issued under emergency regulations that was in-effect at the time and was informed that he was suspended as Army Commander with effect from 7 July 1966. Transferred to the Welikada Prison, he was remanded at the Welikada Prison for three years as the trial took place and the Supreme Court found him not guilty and acquitted him of all charges. His legal counsels were Neville Samarakoon, QC and Tissa Wijeyeratne.

== Later years ==
Following his acquittal he contested the Matale seat from the Sri Lanka Freedom Party and was elected as a Member of Parliament in the 1970 General Election which he held till 1977, when he was defeated in 1977 General Election. By the late 1970s he became a supporter of the United National Party and in 1979 he was appointed Sri Lankan Ambassador to Iraq, serving until 1982. The government of Sri Lanka bestowed the title of Deshamanya and on his death in 1995 a state funeral was granted with full military honours.

== Family ==
Udugama married Rita Nugawela Kumarihamy, daughter of Tikiri Banda Nugawela, Rate Mahatmaya of Udu Nuwara and sister of Colonel Alan Nugawela. They had a son, Ajith Ravindra and a daughter, Kshanika.

== Honours ==
He was made a Member of the Order of the British Empire (MBE) in the 1956 New Year Honours and was awarded the title Deshamanya by the Government of Sri Lanka in 1993. For his war service he was awarded the Burma Star, the Defence Medal and the War Medal 1939–1945. During his service in the Ceylon Army, he received the Ceylon Armed Services Inauguration Medal.

== See also ==
- Sri Lankan Non Career Diplomats

Military offices
Preceded by H.W.G. Wijeyekoon	Commander of the Ceylon Army; 1964–1966	Succeeded by Bertram Heyn
