= Royal Thomian Regatta =

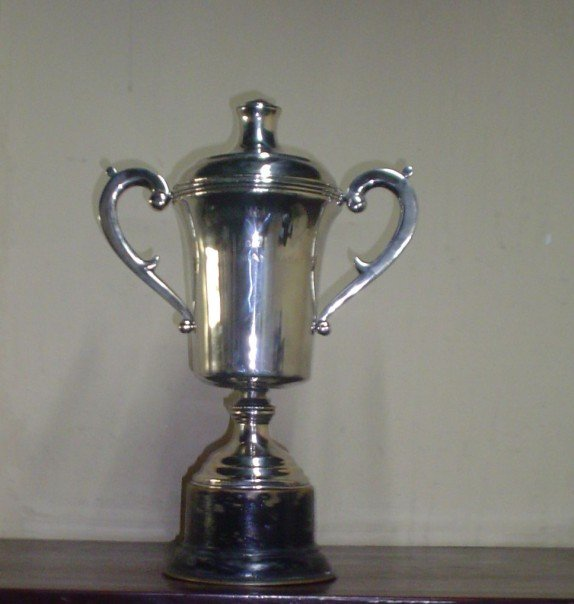
- The TN Fernando Trophy. Awarded to the Overall Winner of the Regatta
- Sport: Rowing
- Teams: Royal College; S. Thomas' College
- First meeting: 1966; 60 years ago
- Latest meeting: 2026; Royal - 26, S. Thomas’ - 26
- Trophy: T. Noel Fernando Memorial Trophy

Statistics
- All-time record: S. Thomas leads, 25–24–6 (.509)
- Longest win streak: Royal, 5 (2015–2019)
- Current win streak: Royal, 2 (2024 and 2025)

The Royal Thomian Regatta is the annual rowing encounter between traditional school rivals Royal College, Colombo and S. Thomas' College, Mt Lavinia. Begun in 1962 as the Royal Thomian Boat Race it later evolved into a regatta in 1966 and now consists of eight events. It is among the oldest and most prestigious Royal-Thomian sporting encounters.

The races are rowed over a distance of 1000 yards and take place on the Beira Lake in Colombo. The regatta takes place in the month of October and is usually held on the last Saturday of the month at the Colombo Rowing Club. The Royal Thomian Regatta is the oldest inter-school rowing regatta in Sri Lanka, with Royal being the first school to take up school rowing in the country and S.Thomas' following suit a few years later.

The Boat Race is still regarded as the most prestigious race of the regatta and is rowed for the Royal Thomian Boat Race Trophy (also known in the rowing fraternity as the 'Crossed Oars'). The overall winner of the Regatta is awarded the T. Noel Fernando Memorial Trophy.

Having begun in 1962 'The Regatta' is the 3rd oldest sporting encounter between Royal College and S. Thomas' College, after the Battle of the Blues Cricket Match and the Rugby Match.

== History ==
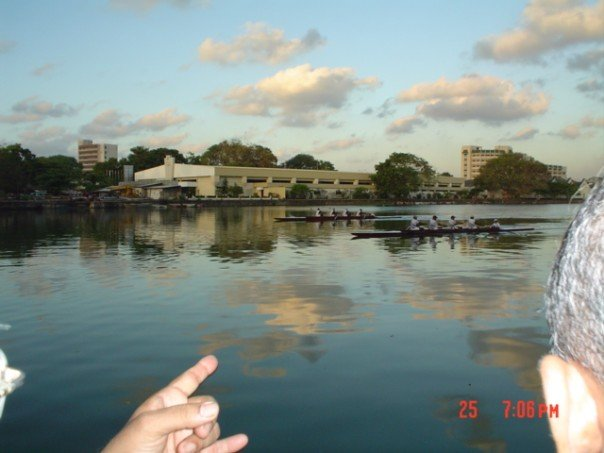
Boat Race 2003 close to the finish line S. Thomas'(nearside) win by 1/2 foot.

Royal College first began rowing in 1953 and was the first school in Ceylon to do so, the first Captain was Alavi Mohomed. S. Thomas' College began rowing a few years later. In the following years the idea of a race between the two schools was agreed upon and in 1962 the first Boat Race was held on the Beira Lake at the Colombo Rowing Club. The Royalist's led by L.A.W. Sirisena beat the Thomians led by C.N. Sirimanne by 1 boat length and were the first holders of the Boat Race Trophy. S. Thomas' won their first Boat Race in 1964 beating Royal by 3 lengths. S.Thomas' continued to win the Boat Race trophy for three years after creating the largest series of successive wins that was not beaten until Royal College won five boat races between 2015 and 2019.

In 1966, the first Royal Thomian Regatta was held with a line-up of 6 events namely the Coxed Fours, Coxed Pairs (rowed coxless in the present day), and Single Sculls in two senior and junior categories.

Between 1973 and 1979 the regatta was not held due to a dispute between the two schools. The series was revived in 1980 has continued to the present except in 2006 when the regatta was not held.

In 2007 the Royal College led by Maalik Aziz created history by winning all races and winning the Overall Trophy with a margin of 40 points to nil. Royal College created new record timings for most events including lowering the Boat Race Trophy record by 8 secs to 3 mins 11 secs.

In 2008, history was written yet again with S.Thomas' returning the favour in kind in a hard-fought regatta of 32-8 resulting in every record being broken. S'Thomas' College led by Manil Salgadoe and Devaan Hallock made most of the records including the Boat race (3.06). Royal College managed to scrape in two records to stay in the count in the Junior Coxed Four (rowed for eight points ) and the exhibition Junior 'B' Four race (carries no points).

In 2011, the Royal College Rowing Team led by skipper Chirath Karunanayake added a few more records into the books. Among the records set were;

a) The biggest winning margin Royal 48-04 (2011) (subsequently broken in 2016 by Royal College)

b) A new overall course record and the first ever sub-three minute race, for the Senior Four - 2:55 Crew consisting of: Chirath Karunanayake - Bow, Ajmal Sideek - 2, Jehan Smarasekera - 3, Sanjiva Jayasuriya - Stroke, Pasan Ranaweera - Cox.

c) Junior Four - 3:03

d) Senior Pair - 3:12

e) Senior Sculls - 3:28

f) Junior Sculls - 3:29.

S. Thomas' only managed to win the B double and the Junior 'B' four, in which the latter event carries no points.

In 2015, for the first time in the Royal-Thomian history, both crews managed to clock below 3 minutes at the boat race.

--The crew timings were as follows:

Royal College 2:56:- Praveen Hapugalle, Prathap Perera, Amrith Fernando, Sajid Ajmal, Kaveen Rajapakse.

S. Thomas' 2:57:- Senal Senevirathne, Suramba Serasinghe, Ramith Nanayakkara, Saliya Gunasekera, Wishmitha Peiris.

In 2016, the highest number of trophies won in a regatta was achieved by Royal College led by Kaveen Rajapakse with a new tally of 50–02. S. Thomas' only secured the Junior Scull race worth two points that year. Currently this is the highest margin of victory in the Royal-Thomian Regatta history.

In 2019, The Royal Thomian Regatta celebrated its Golden Jubilee event and was attended by a host of past captains and many well wishers. The Royal College Rowing Crew captained by Sajaad Ajmal was able to retain both T.N. Fernando Memorial Trophy and Boat Race trophies for the 5th year in a row which was the first time either institutions achieved this feat. In another first, the Most Outstanding Oarsman trophy was shared by four oarsmen Sajaad Ajmal, Jehan Hapugalle, Mayukha Gamage & Maliq Hassen each contributing in events worth 20 points in favour of Royal College.

The regatta was not held in 2020 and 2021 owing to the COVID-19 pandemic.

In 2022, after a lapse of five defeats STC headed by skipper Arritha Raddalagoda defeated RC by 42 to 10 points. STC won all races except the Senior Scull, Junior Double Scull. The boat race was won by circa 4 lengths on RC. 42 to 10 is the largest margin of victory for the Thomian Crew. Arittha Raddalgoda was deemed the Most Outstanding Oarsman for the year. The A pair record was subsequently broken by Ayuka Amarasekara, with a new record of 3.11.

In 2023, The Thomian Crew emerged victorious under the leadership of Captain Chevon Perera, with a score of 30 to 22. Ayuka Amerasekara and Sahin Dayabaran managed to break the previously set record for the Senior Pair event, the new record is 3.09. Sarith Abeysiri Gunawardene and Newan Perera broke the Senior Double scull record, now set at 3.04. The Junior Pair record was broken by Jayden Jayasekara and Thevinu Weligepolage, the record is now set at 3.17. Ayuka Amarasekara was the Most Outstanding Oarsman of the year.

In 2024, the Royal-Thomian Rowing Regatta saw Royal College secure a historic victory over S. Thomas’ College with a score of 44-8, reclaiming the title after a two-year gap. Under the leadership of Newan Perera and Vice Captain Jayden Jayasekara, Royal’s crew excelled across the events, culminating in a decisive triumph.

The competition began with S. Thomas' College taking an early lead by winning the ‘A’ Scull event, earning six points and establishing a 6-0 advantage. Royal College turned the tide in the second event, winning the A Pair in a stunning finish and regaining the lead with a score of 8-6. S. Thomas' followed with a win in the ‘B’ Scull, tying the score at 8-8. However, Royal College dominated the remainder of the day, winning all the remaining races. Their strong performance culminated in the prestigious Boat Race, where they triumphed in the ‘A’ Four event, securing the maximum 12 points and ultimately achieving a total score of 44-8. This resounding victory underscored Royal College's prowess in school rowing and solidified their legacy in the long-standing rivalry with S. Thomas' College. Saadh Ajmal and Thevinu Weligepolage were awarded the Most Outstanding Oarsmen of the year.

In the 54th Royal–Thomian Rowing Regatta in 2025, Royal College retained the title for the second consecutive year, defeating S. Thomas’ College with a score of 36–16. Under the captaincy of Thevinu Weligepolage and vice-captaincy of Saadh Ajmal, Royal once again demonstrated exceptional dominance on the water. The captain and vice-captain duo went on to be named the Most Outstanding Oarsmen of the regatta, contributing an impressive 20 out of Royal’s 36 points.

The contest began with S. Thomas’ College taking an early lead by winning both the Senior Scull and Junior Scull events. Royal College responded strongly, securing victories in the Senior Pair races to narrow the gap. Following Royal’s win in the B Pair, S. Thomas’ claimed the A Double Scull, bringing the scoreline close once again. However, Royal College surged ahead thereafter, winning all remaining events, including the Junior Double Scull, Under-16 Four, Junior B Four, Old Boys’ Four, Junior Four, and culminating in a decisive victory in the Boat Race.

The highlight of the day came in the Boat Race, where Royal’s Boat Race crew consisting of Saadh Ajmal (Stroke), Niduk Batapolaarachchi (3), Uddeep Liyanage (2), Thevinu Weligepolage (Bow), and Rahil Abhayaratne (Cox) equalled the long-standing record time of 2 minutes and 55 seconds, a benchmark that had remained unmatched for 14 years.

In 2026, the Royal-Thomian rowing regatta ended in a draw having both crews finished 26-26. Royal Captain Niduk Batapolaarachchi and S. Thomas' Captain Cayden Perera were declared joint champions of the regatta. Denver Deheragoda was declared the Most Outstanding Oarsman of the regatta contributing 18 points to the tally.

The competition began with Denver Deheragoda of S. Thomas' College taking an early lead by winning the Senior Scull and breaking the record with a new timing of 3.22. Royal College completely turned the tide by winning the Junior Scull, Senior Pair, Junior Pair, Senior Double Scull, Junior Double Scull and the Junior 'B' Fours. STC won the remaining events by winning the Under-16 Four and Old Boys' Four. The Junior Four was won by Senula Samarasinghe (Stroke), Asir Nasoordeen (3), Gayanuka Fernando (2), Navodya Widanapathirana (Bow), and Dhiren Perera (Cox) of S. Thomas' College. The Boat race was won by Cayden Perera (Stroke), Joel Munipura (3), Prethvishaanth Harithwarnan (2), Denver Deheragoda (Bow), and Shevan Udugama (Cox) of S. Thomas' College.

== Race Format ==
All Races are rowed over the distance of 1000 yards on the Beira Lake course.

Each event has specific number of points allotted towards it the aggregate points is equal 40 points (up to 2008), the winner of the each event/race receives these points and at the end of the regatta the school with the highest aggregate of points will be declared the Overall Winner and be the holders of the T. Noel Fernando Trophy.

Event	Notation	Points	Trophy
Boat Race	A4+	12	Royal Thomian Boat Race Trophy (Crossed Oars Trophy)
Senior Coxless Pairs	A2-	8	Freddie Ruax Trophy
Senior Double Sculls	A2x	8	Inaugural Trophy (Sirisena-Sirimanne Trophy)
Senior Single Sculls	A1x	6	Senior Sculls Challenge Trophy
Junior Coxed Fours	B4+	8	Eraj Wijesinghe Trophy
Junior Coxless Pairs	B2-	4	Chula Samarasinghe Challenge Trophy
Junior Double Sculls	B2x	4	Revival Trophy (Phillps- Moheed Trophy)
Junior Single Sculls	B1x	2	Ajith Goonawardena Challenge Trophy

In 1999, The Junior 'B' Coxed Fours was introduced but the event carries no points.

Junior 'B' Coxed Fours	C4+	None	Percy Fernando Trophy

In 2008, Senior and Junior Double Sculls were introduced as exhibition events. In 2009 Senior and Junior Double Sculls were awarded 8 and 4 points respectively, with the inclusion of the two doubles sculls the overall points tally was made to carry 52 points. In 2010 an Under 16 Fours event was added on the programme as an exhibition race.

== Records ==
=== Boat Race ===
School	Wins
Royal	26
S. Thomas	29

Year	Winner	Time	Royal Wins	S. Thomas' Wins	Boat and Class	Overall winner
1962	Royal	3:35	1	0	Clinker Fours/Training-Wooden	Royal
1963	Royal	4:04.5	2	0	Clinker Fours/Training-Wooden	
1964	S. Thomas	3:45.5	2	1	Clinker Fours/Training-Wooden	
1965	S. Thomas	3:55.8	2	2	Clinker Fours/Training-Wooden	S. Thomas
1966	S. Thomas	3:55	2	3	Clinker Fours/Training-Wooden	
1967	S. Thomas	3:55	2	4	Clinker Fours/Training-Wooden	
1968	Royal	3:47	3	4	Clinker Fours/Training-Wooden	Royal
1969	Royal	3:56.5	4	4	Clinker Fours/Training-Wooden	Royal
1970	Royal	3:48.8	5	4	Clinker Fours/Training-Wooden	Royal
1971	S. Thomas	3:52.5	5	5	Clinker Fours/Training-Wooden	S. Thomas
1972	Royal	3:47	6	5	Clinker Fours/Training-Wooden	Royal
1973–1979	Regatta not held					
1980	S. Thomas		6	6	Clinker Fours/Training-Wooden	
1981	Royal	3:49	7	6	Clinker Fours/Training-Wooden	
1982	Royal	3:47	8	6	Clinker Fours/Training-Wooden	
1983	S. Thomas	3:40	8	7	Clinker Fours/Training-Wooden	
1984	S. Thomas	3:47	8	8	Clinker Fours/Training-Wooden	
1985	Royal	3:40	9	8	Clinker Fours/Training-Wooden	
1986	S. Thomas	3:29	9	9	Clinker Fours/Training-Wooden	
1987	Royal	3:38	10	9	Clinker Fours/Training-Wooden	
1988	Royal	3:40	11	9	Clinker Fours/Training-Wooden	Royal
1989	S. Thomas	3:58	11	10	Clinker Fours/Training-Wooden	S. Thomas
1990	Royal	3:37	12	10	Clinker Fours/Training-Wooden	Royal
1991	S. Thomas	3:37	12	11	Clinker Fours/Training-Wooden	S. Thomas
1992	Royal	3:32	13	11	Clinker Fours/Training-Wooden	Royal
1993	Royal	3:35.4	14	11	Clinker Fours/Training-Wooden	Tie
1994	S. Thomas	3:42	14	12	Clinker Fours/Training-Wooden	S. Thomas
1995	S. Thomas	3:38	14	13	Clinker Fours/Training-Wooden	S. Thomas
1996	S. Thomas	3:38	14	14	Clinker Fours/Training-Wooden	Royal
1997	S. Thomas	3:32	14	15	Clinker Fours/Training-Wooden	S. Thomas
1998	Royal	3:39	15	15	Clinker Fours/Training-Wooden	Royal
1999	S. Thomas	3:21	15	16	Empacher Fours/Racing-Wooden	S. Thomas
2000	Royal	3:20	16	16	Empacher Fours/Racing-Wooden	S. Thomas
2001	Royal	3:22	17	16	Empacher Fours/Racing-Wooden	S. Thomas
October 26, 2002	S. Thomas	3:21	17	17	Empacher Fours/Racing-Wooden	S. Thomas
October 25, 2003	S. Thomas	3:26	17	18	Empacher Fours/Racing-Wooden	Tie
October 30, 2004	S. Thomas	3:20	17	19	Empacher Fours/Racing-Wooden	S. Thomas
October 29, 2005	S. Thomas	3:19	17	20	Empacher Fours/Racing-Wooden	Tie
2006	Regatta not held					
October 27, 2007	Royal	3:11	18	20	Club Racers/Racing-Fiberglass	Royal
October 25, 2008	S. Thomas	3:06	18	21	Club Racers/Racing-Fiberglass	S. Thomas
October 24, 2009	S. Thomas	3:02	18	22	Club Racers/Racing-Fiberglass	S. Thomas
October 23, 2010	S. Thomas	3:07	18	23	Club Racers/Racing-Fiberglass	Royal
October 22, 2011	Royal	2:55*	19	23	International/Racing-Fiberglass	Royal
October 27, 2012	S. Thomas	3:04	19	24	International/Racing-Fiberglass	S. Thomas
October 26, 2013	S. Thomas	3:04	19	25	International/Racing-Fiberglass	S. Thomas
October 25, 2014	S. Thomas	3:03	19	26	International/Racing-Fiberglass	S. Thomas
October 24, 2015	Royal	2:56*	20	26	International/Racing-Fiberglass	Royal
October 22, 2016	Royal	3:08	21	26	International/Racing-Fiberglass	Royal
October 28, 2017	Royal	3:12	22	26	International/Racing-Fiberglass	Royal
October 27, 2018	Royal	3:07	23	26	International/Racing-Fiberglass	Royal
October 26, 2019	Royal	3:00	24	26	International/Racing-Fiberglass	Royal
2020-2021	Regatta not held					
October 22, 2022	S. Thomas	3:10	24	27	International/Racing-Fiberglass	S. Thomas
October 21, 2023	S. Thomas	3:02	24	28	International/Racing-Fiberglass	S. Thomas
October 26, 2024	Royal	2:59	25	28	International/Racing-Fiberglass	Royal
October 5, 2025	Royal	2:55	26	28	International/Racing-Fiberglass	Royal
October 23, 2026	S. Thomas	3.05	26	29	International/Racing-Fiberglass	Tie

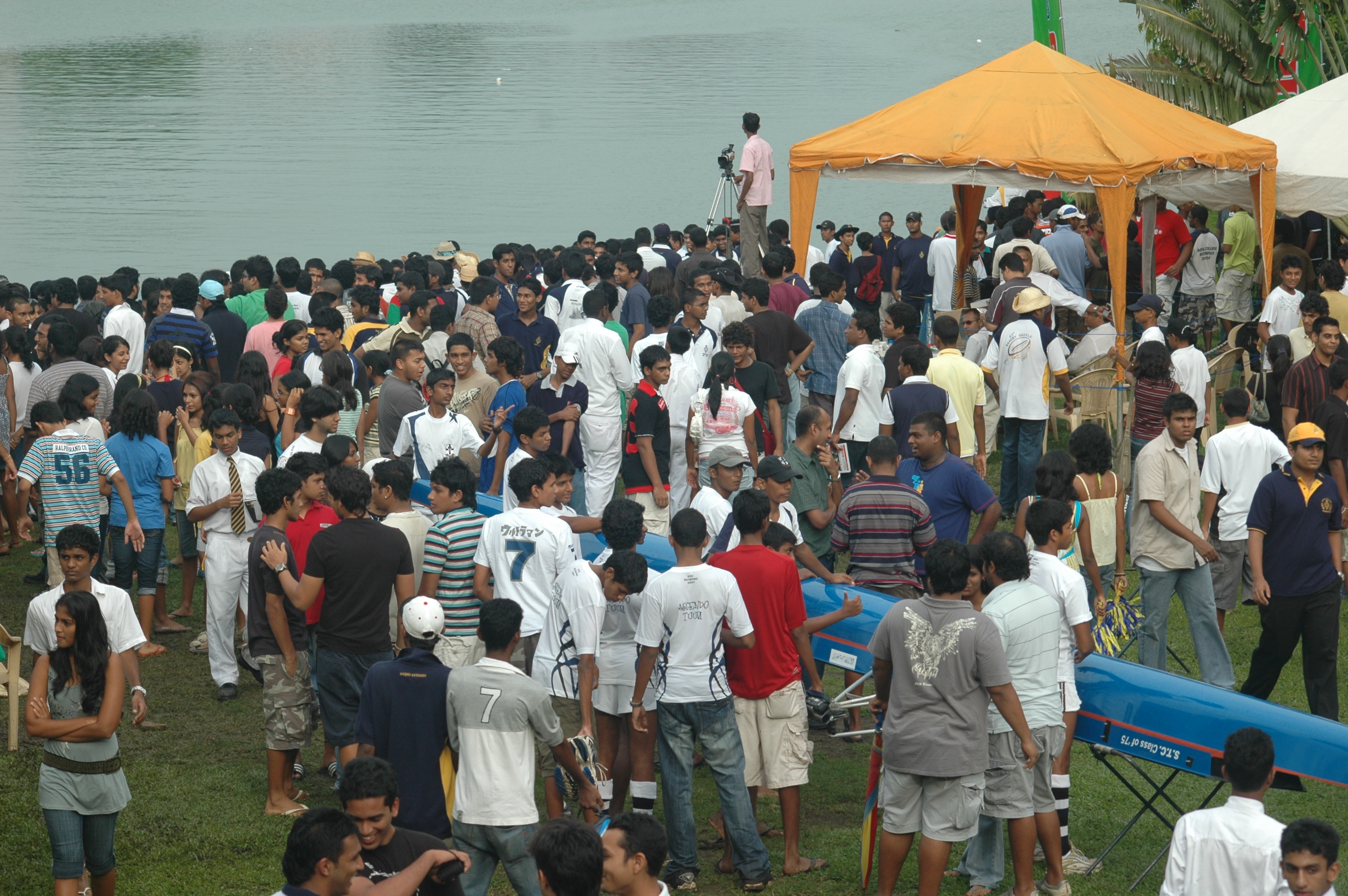
Typical crowd at the Colombo Rowing Club during the Royal Thomian Regatta

=== Tally of Trophies ===
Event	Trophy	Royal College	S' Thomas' College	Tie
Boat Race	Boat Race Trophy	26	29	
Junior Fours	Eraj Wijesinghe Trophy	24	20	
Senior Pairs	Freddie Raux Trophy	25	12	
Senior Sculls	Senior Sculls Challenge Trophy	13	21	01
Junior Pairs	Chula Samarasinghe Challenge Trophy	20	08	
Junior Sculls	Ajith Goonawardena Challenge Trophy	10	17	
Senior Double Sculls	Inaugural Trophy(Sirisena-Sirimanne Trophy)	10	06	
Junior Double Sculls	Revival Trophy (Mohdeen-Phillips Trophy)	12	04	
Under-16 Fours	Captain Janaka De Fonseka Memorial Trophy	8	6	
Junior B Fours	Percy Fernando Memorial Trophy	17	05	

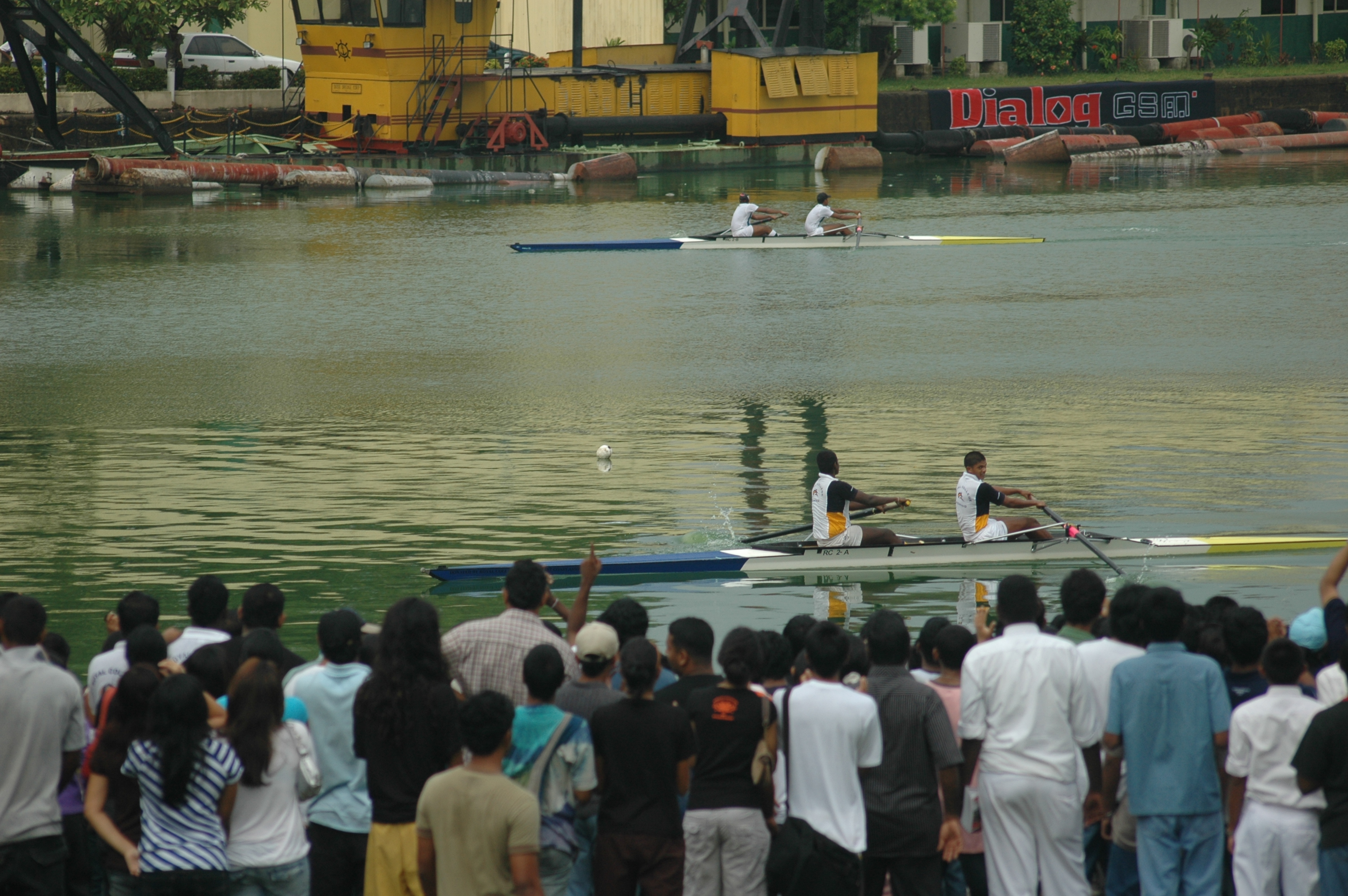
Royal (nearside) winning Junior Pairs 2007 with new record time.

=== Most Outstanding Oarsman of the Regatta ===
The Oarsman with highest individual aggregate of points at the end of the regatta is awarded the Most Outstanding Oarsman of the Regatta Trophy.

Previous Winners

- 2001 Talal Shums (RC) -14 points (A4+, B1x)
- 2002 Tharindu Gunesekara (STC) -20 Points (A4+, A2+)
- 2003 Isuru Perera (STC) -18 Points (A4+, A1x)
- 2004 Isuru Perera (STC) -18 Points (A4+, A1x)
- 2005 Maalik Aziz (RC) -16 Points (B4+, A2-)
- 2007 Maalik Aziz (A4+, B2-, A1x) / Dinouk J. Perera (RC) (A4+, A2-, B1x) -22 Points
- 2008 Devaan Hallock (STC) -22 Points (A4+, A2-, B1x)
- 2009 Sajeev De Silva (STC) -30 Points (A4+, B2-, A2x, A1x)
- 2010 Sajeev De Silva (STC) -18 Points (A4+, A1x)
- 2011 Chirath Karunanayake (RC) -26 Points (A4+, A2x, A1x)
- 2012 Ming-Hua Chang/ Ramith Nanayakkara (STC)- 20 points (A4+, A2x)
- 2013 Sandesh Bartlett (STC) - 26 points (A1x, A2x, A4+)
- 2014 Ramith Nanayakkara/ Vishan Gunatilleka (STC) 20 points (A4+, A2-)
- 2015 Sajid Ajmal/ Praveen Hapugalla (RC) - 20 points (A4+, A2-)
- 2016 Hashen Hettigoda (RC) - 26 points (A4+, A2×, A1x)
- 2017 Hashen Hettigoda (RC) - 26 points (A4+, A2×, A1x)
- 2018 Sajaad Ajmal/ Abdulla Hassen (RC) - 20 points (A4+, A2-)
- 2019 Sajaad Ajmal/ Mayukha Gamage (RC)(A4+, A2-)/ Jehan Hapugalle/ Maliq Hassen (RC)(A4+, A2×) - 20 points
- 2022 Arittha Raddalgoda (STC) - 22 points (A4+, A2x, B1x)
- 2023 Ayuka Amarasekara (STC) - 20 Points (A4+, A2-)
- 2024 Saadh Ajmal / Thevinu Weligepolage (RC) - 20 points (A4+, A2-)
- 2025 Saadh Ajmal / Thevinu Weligepolage (RC) - 20 points (A4+, A2-)
- 2026 Denver Deheragoda (STC) - 18 Points (A4+, A1x)

== Statistics ==
=== Record Times ===
Event	Best Time Royal	Year	Best Time S. Thomas'	Year	Record holding Crew	School
Boat Race	2:55*	2011, 2025	2.56	2025	RC-2011 Chirath Karunanayake(B), Ajmal Sideek(2), Jehan Samarasekara(3), Sanjiva Jayasuriya(S), Pasan Ranaweera(Cox) RC-2025 Thevinu Weligepolage (B), Uddeep Liyanage (2), Niduk Vimukthi (3), Saadh Ajmal (S), Rahil Abhayarathne (cox)	Royal
Junior Fours	3.03*	2011	3.03*	2019	RC- Arith Cooray(B), Ishan Perera(2), Sahan Warnasooriya(3), Dulaj Rajaguru(S), Dhanushka Perera(Cox) (2011) STC- Avinash Rajaguru(B), Arittha Raddaloda(2), Bhanuka Rathnayake(3), Shanara Senaratne(S), Chevon Perera(Cox) (2019)	S. Thomas / Royal
Senior Pairs	3.12	2011&2016	3.09*	2023	Sahin Dayabaran(B), Ayuka Amarasekara(S)	S. Thomas
Senior Sculls	3.27	2022	3.22*	2026	Denver Deheragoda	S. Thomas
Senior Double Sculls	3.04*	2023	3.08	2025	Sarith Abeysirigunawardena, Newan Perera	Royal
Junior Pairs	3.17*	2023	3.18	2013	Thevinu Welipolage (B), Jayden Jayasekara(S)	Royal
Junior Sculls	3.29	2011	3.28*	2013	Vishan Gunatilleke	S. Thomas
Junior Double Sculls	3.11*	2013	3.16	2026	Bilal Hassan(B), Dulaj Rajaguru(S)	Royal
Junior B Fours (Exhibition Race - No Points)	3.12*	2019	3.13	2019	Maneth Pothupitiya(B), Minula Algoda(2), Raaidh Omar(3), Dinal Aluthgama(S), Thaviru Hettiarachchi(cox)	Royal
Under 16 Fours (Exhibition Race - No Points)			3.18*	2023	Vinuk Senaratne(B), Cayden Perera(2), Denver Deheregoda(3), Nithik Senaratne(S), Jordan Jansz(cox)	S. Thomas

* denotes series record

=== Won 3 or more Boat Races ===
S. Thomas'

- C H L Sirimanne 1965,1966,1967
- Isuru Perera 2002, 2003, 2004
- Dejan De Zoysa 2002, 2003, 2004
- Dineshka Aluwihare 2003, 2004, 2005
- Anuradha Nadaraja 2012,2013,2014
- Ramith Nanayakkara 2012,2013,2014
- Kemil Peter (cox) 2012,2013,2014

Royal

- E R Perera 1968,1969,1970
- Percy Fernando 1969,1970,1972
- Nalin Samarawickrama 1985,1987,1988
- Prathap Perera 2015,2016,2017
- M Sajaad Ajmal 2017,2018,2019

== Trivia ==
- The Boat Race Trophy once possessed a metal wreath around the oars that has since been lost.
- Thomians Isuru Perera (2004), Dejan De Zoysa (2004), Sajeev De Silva (2010) have been awarded the 'Thomian Blue' for their outstanding contribution to Sri Lankan rowing, by representing the country and being placed at an international regatta while still in school.
- Olympic medallist, Mahe Drysdale briefly visited the regatta in 2012.

== See also ==
- Royal College, Colombo
- S. Thomas' College, Mt Lavinia
- Royal-Thomian rivalry
- The Royal-Thomian
- Royal College Rowing Club
