= Colombo Rowing Club =

Sri Lankan boat club

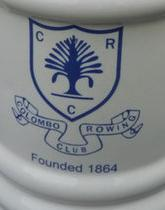
- Location: Colombo, Sri Lanka
- Home water: Beira Lake
- Founded: 1864
- Affiliations: AREA, FEARA, ARASL

Events
- Madras-Colombo; Harry Creasy Fours; Centenary Oars; Herman Sirimanne Sculls; V.A. Julius Pairs

Distinctions
- AREA Champions 2010, 2020

Notable members
- The First Ceylonese (Sri Lankan) President of the Colombo Rowing Club was G.A.C(Colvin) Sirimanne, the then Government Analyst of Ceylon.

The Colombo Rowing Club (commonly known as CRC) is the premier boat club in Sri Lanka having been founded in 1864. Its clubhouse and boat house are located on the edge of the northern Beira Lake, at Sir Chittapalam A. Gardiner Mawatha (formerly Parsons Road), in Colombo.

Since its inception the Colombo Rowing Club has progressed into one of the most prestigious and active private member clubs in Sri Lanka. A distinctive feature has been that while the club's main sporting focus remains in rowing, social interaction and fellowship is also an important aspect. The club claims to be the cradle of rowing in Sri Lanka since most affiliated clubs of the Amateur Rowing Association of Sri Lanka, governing body for rowing in Sri Lanka, started from the facilities and infrastructure that is available at the Colombo Rowing Club.

== History ==
The club was founded on the July 15, 1864 by Sir Edward Creasy, the former Chief Justice of Ceylon and based on available records, the CRC claims to be the oldest club in the island. The Colombo Rowing Club adopted the club colours of Oxford: Oxford Blue and White. The membership of club was predominantly made up on colonialists affiliated with the many government departments and plantations in the island.

In 1898, the first Boat Race took place between the Colombo Rowing Club and the Madras Boat Club (now Chennai, India). The rivalry prevails to the present day in the form of the Madras-Colombo Regatta in which the Boat Race is the premier event. Thus, the boat race is considered second in vintage only to the prestigious Oxford and Cambridge boat race which is the world's oldest, continuing inter-institutional event.

With Ceylon gaining independence the club was opened up to more locals and Alavi Mohomed was selected as the first Ceylonese captain of the Club. In the 1950s and 1960s the club helped to introduce the sport to Royal College, S' Thomas' College and University of Colombo. The Club has hosted the annual Royal Thomian Regatta since 1962. The club commemorated its centenary year in 1964. The Colombo Rowing Club and the surrounding Beira Lake have hosted the Sri Lanka National Rowing Championships on twenty-four occasions till 2008. The National Championships have since moved to Bolgoda Lake which boasts a 2000m international distance course.

In 2012, the Colombo Rowing Club was visited by Olympic Gold Medallist Mahé Drysdale and former Oxford Boat Race captain Donald MacDonald whose 1987 Ox-Bridge Boat Race mutiny and subsequent victory inspired the 1996 movie True Blue.

The staircase present at the current premises in Colombo (the club moved to Parson's Road circa 1910) was a staircase removed from a British-era ship which was then subsequently fixed at CRC. Similarly, the lighting fixtures at the bar and upper boat house are made from old rowing shells from the 1950s.

== Present situation ==
There are 14 institutions currently using the facilities at the Colombo Rowing Club and the club extends all levels of support for the development of rowing. The club hosts as many as 7 regattas throughout the year catering to novices, intermediates and senior oarsmen/women. The current president is Dimuth Gunawardene with Manilka Gunaratene as captain.

CRC won the overall championship at the Amateur Rowing Association of East Regatta in both 2011 when it was hosted by the Bolgoda Lake Rowing Club. It won the regatta once again in 2019 when held in Calcutta.

New boats named after members killed in the Second World War. The remains of the boat are still present at the club today

The Boat Race between the Colombo Rowing Club and Madras Boat Club is second in vintage only to the Oxford-Cambridge Boat Race and has been held since 1898.

== Regattas conducted ==
- Inaugural Regatta
- South-West Monsoon Regatta
- Head of the Beira Regatta
- Ranfer Sprints
- Inter-Monsoon Regatta
- North East Monsoon Regatta
- Closing Regatta
- Madras-Colombo Regatta
- Karachi-Colombo Regatta
- Amateur Rowing Association of East Regatta

== Regattas conducted at the Colombo Rowing Club ==
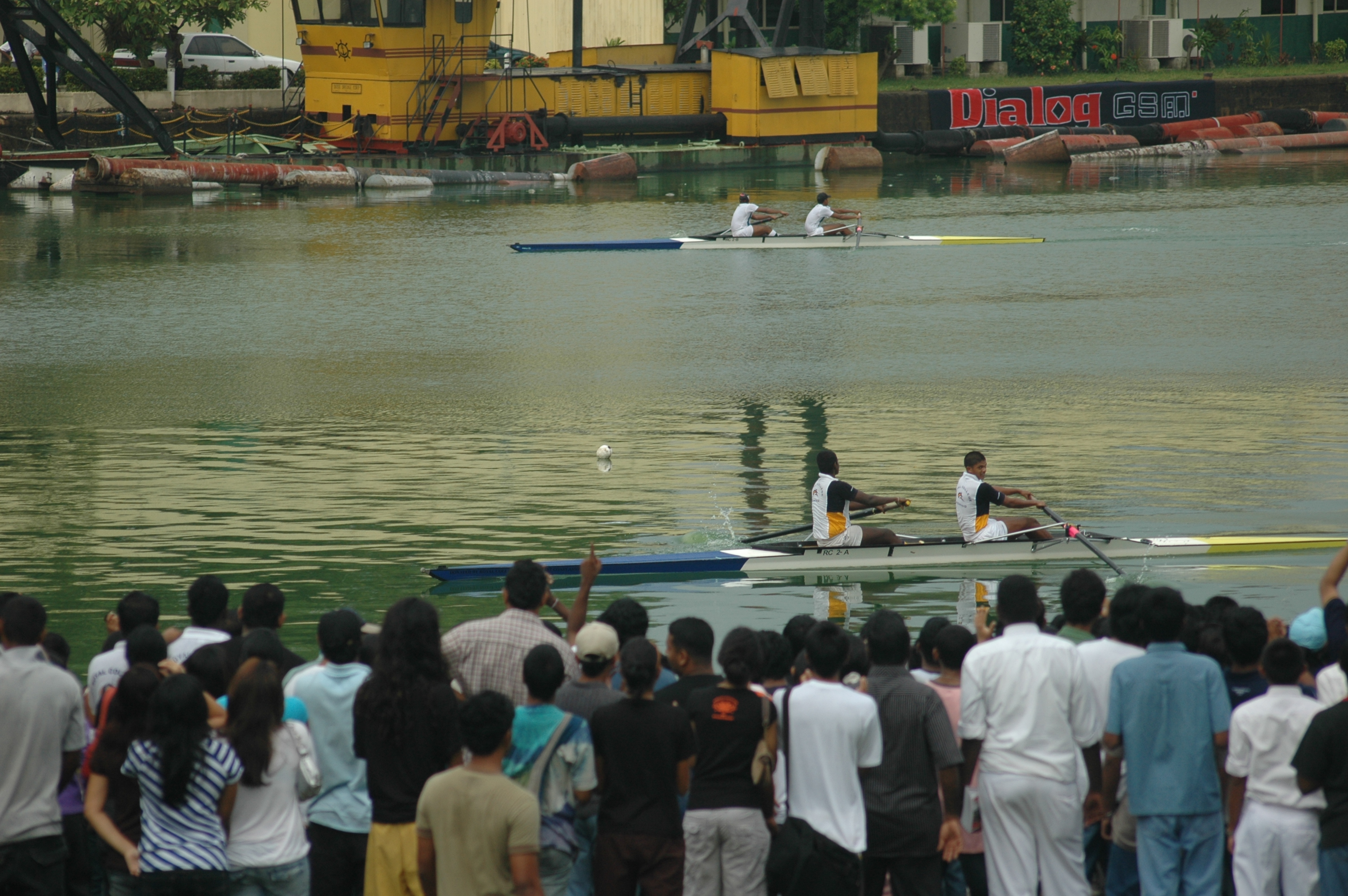
Royal (nearside) winning Junior Pairs at the 2007 Royal Thomian Regatta

- Madras-Colombo Regatta
- Royal Thomian Regatta
- University of Colombo vs University of Moratuwa
- Ladies College vs Musaeus College
- Ananda College vs Asian International School (The Battle of the 'A's)

== The Madras-Colombo Regatta ==
The Madras-Colombo Regatta is the annual rowing encounter between the Colombo Rowing Club and Madras Boat Club. It has been held since 1898. The premier event, the Men's Boat Race is the second oldest inter-club boat race in the world, second only to the Oxford-Cambridge Boat Race. Winners of the men's regatta are awarded the Deepam Trophy, while the overall winners of the women's regatta are awarded the Adyar Trophy.

The regatta has been held continuously barring the two world wars, and other periods of uncertainty such as episodes during the Sri Lankan civil war.

The Boat Race has been held since 1898, making it second in vintage only to the Oxford Cambridge Boat Race

Hosting is rotational with each institution hosting the other annually in both India and Sri Lanka. At present the regatta has evolved into a full regatta with both men's and women's crews competing.

=== Present ===
The last regatta was held in 2019 when Colombo, under the captaincy of Ishika de Silva (CRC's first female captain), won both the men's and women's regattas. It has not been held since due to the Covid-19 pandemic.

Colombo Rowing Club Boat Race Crew 1936

=== Notable Rowers ===
- P.E. Rowlandson (Colombo Crew 1929, Madras Crew 1930) is the only rower to have won a boat race for both Madras and Colombo
- Colombo rowers Gordon Armstrong and Basil Drakeford were subsequently K.I.A. in the Second World War. The former has a regatta named in his honour at the Colombo Rowing Club
- Alavi Mohamed (the first Ceylonese president of the Colombo Rowing Club)
- Ashmitha Gunaratne - The First Ladies coxswain to win the Men’s Boat race in 2019 (Crew : Ruven Weerasinghe (S), Sandesh Bartlett, Abdulla Hassan, Sumith Alexander (B) ) She also coxed the women’s boat race and won in the same regatta.
- Ishika de Silva - CRC’s first female captain of boats who went on to lead two winning crews at both the Madras Colombo and ARAE regattas in the same term in both the men’s and women’s categories.
