= Naysum Saravanamuttu =

Ceylonese politician

Lady Naysum Saravanamuttu MSC
- நேசம் சரவணமுத்து

Member of the State Council of Ceylon for Colombo North
- In office 1932–1941

Personal details
- Born: Luisa Naysum Arunachalam; 1897
- Died: 19 January 1941 (aged 43–44) Colombo, Ceylon
- Spouse: Ratnasothy Saravanamuttu
- Children: 4
- Occupation: Politician

Luisa, Lady Naysum Saravanamuttu (née Arunachalam; 1897 – 19 January 1941) was a Ceylonese politician. She was the second female member of State Council of Ceylon and the second elected female legislator in Sri Lanka.

She was married to Sir Ratnasothy Saravanamuttu a physician and politician, who in 1931, was elected to the first State Council of Ceylon representing Colombo North. Her husband was removed from the State Council after he was found guilty of corrupt practices by an election Judge. Naysum became the second female member of the State Council in 1931, when she won her husband's seat in a by-election. She was re-elected to the second State Council in 1936 and retained the position until her death in January 1941.

== See also ==
- List of political families in Sri Lanka
