= Ratnasothy Saravanamuttu =

Ceylon Tamil physician and politician

Sir Ratnasothy Saravanamuttu MSC MMC
- இரத்தினசோதி சரவணமுத்து

Member of the State Council of Ceylon for Colombo North
- In office 1931–1931
- Succeeded by: Naysum Saravanamuttu

1st Mayor of Colombo
- In office May 1937 – December 1937
- Succeeded by: V. R. Schockman
- In office January 1941 – December 1942
- Preceded by: A. E. Goonesinghe
- Succeeded by: George R. de Silvs

Member of Colombo Municipal Council
- In office 1937–1946

Personal details
- Born: October 1886
- Died: Unknown
- Spouse: Naysum Saravanamuttu
- Children: 4
- Education: University of Madras
- Profession: Physician, politician
- Ethnicity: Ceylon Tamil

Sir Ratnasothy Saravanamuttu (Tamil: இரத்தினசோதி சரவணமுத்து; born October 1886) was a Ceylon Tamil physician, politician and the first Mayor of Colombo.

== Early life and family ==
Saravanamuttu was born in October 1886. He was the son of Vetharniam Saravanamuttu, a physician from Colombo in Ceylon. His mother's family were from Vaddukoddai in northern Ceylon. His paternal grandfather Vetharniam is reputed to be the founder of Chunnakam, a small town in northern Ceylon. Saravanamuttu had five eminent brothers: Nanasothy, Tharmasothy, Paikiasothy, Manicasothy and Saptaranajyoti. He was educated at S. Thomas' College, Mount Lavinia where he won many prizes. He earned a Bachelor of Medicine, Master of Surgery degree (M.B.C.M.) from the University of Madras. He then went to England where he obtained M.R.C.S. and Licentiate of the Royal College of Physicians (L.R.C.P.) qualifications.

Saravanamuttu married Naysum. They had two daughters (Seetha and Chandra) and two sons (Vetharaniam and Ratnakumar).

== Career ==
After returning to Ceylon Saravanamuttu established a dispensary in northern Colombo which soon grew to become a large medical centre.

Saravanamuttu was a member of Colombo Municipal Council from May 1937 to December 1946. He served as Mayor of Colombo from May 1937 to December 1937 and from January 1941 to December 1942.

He contested the 1931 State Council election as a candidate in Colombo North and was elected to the State Council. However, he was unseated after being found guilty of corrupt practices by an election Judge. His wife, Naysum, was elected in the ensuing by-election, becoming the second female member of the State Council in 1931.

He was a member of the Liberal League before founding the Independent Labour Party which was later absorbed by the Ceylon National Congress. He played a major role in the relief following the Japanese bombing of Colombo in April 1942.

Saravanamuttu received a knighthood as a Knight Bachelor for public services in the 1943 New Year Honours.
