= Madras Boat Club =

Indian rowing club

- Location: Chennai
- Coordinates: 13°1′N 80°14′E
- Home water: Chennai
- Founded: 1867; 159 years ago
- Membership: 1,600
- Website: madrasboatclub.com

Notable members
- M. M. Muthiah

The Madras Boat Club (Adyar Boat Club) is one of the oldest rowing centres in India, located in Chennai, Tamil Nadu. The area adjoining it is the most expensive locality in South India.

== Background ==
A small group of Englishmen in Madras (now called Chennai) founded the club in 1867. There are records to show that the club was first started in the backwaters of Ennore, and pictures of the rowing course lying alongside the sailing course are still available in the club's archives. Quite possibly sailors, with some rowing involvement back in England, devised the idea of setting up the rowing facility.

Later, in 1892, the club was moved to its present location on the banks of the Adyar river. The early records of the club reveal that in 1874–75 there was a membership of about 32 rowing members and 24 non-rowing members.

In 1898, the club coat of dark blue with brass buttons and the club monogram was adopted by the then committee. The original design is still in use today without modification. Inter-club and intra-club regattas were conducted quite regularly during those years, and the extensive press coverage that the sport received was indicative of its popularity. One name that figures often in the early records is that of F. H. Wilson for his sculling prowess.

In 1933, the Amateur Rowing Association of the East was formed, and the Madras Boat Club was one of its founder members. In the inaugural regatta of the ARAE in 1933 at Pune, MBC won the Willingdon Fours and the Venables Pairs trophies. Through these early years, the club maintained a commendable record of participation and performance in inter-club regattas.

The Madras-Colombo Regatta is the annual rowing encounter between the Colombo Rowing Club and Madras Boat Club. It has been held since 1898 and is widely believed to be among the oldest inter-club regattas in the world. The premier event, the Men's Boat Race is the second oldest inter-club boat race in the world, second only to the Oxford-Cambridge Boat Race. The Boat Race trophy is among the most prestigious trophies awarded. Winners of the men's regatta are awarded the Deepam Trophy, while the overall winners of the women's regatta are awarded the Adyar Trophy.

== First Indian President ==
In 1967, M. M. Muthiah became the club's first Indian president. At that time the club had very limited resources and it strived to keep interest alive. In order to generate fresh interest in the sport, in 1966 students were brought in as members, and today they form the hub of the rowing activity. In 1967, the centenary year of the club, MBC won the prestigious Willingdon Fours at the ARAE regatta.

Enthusiasm was never lacking in the club and several people have contributed to its growth. In the early seventies, Borun Chanda introduced a pattern of organised coaching and training and this paved the way for better performances on the water. It was not long before the results showed; in 1972 MBC won the Willingdon trophy and followed it up the very next year by winning all the three trophies at the ARAE regatta.

== Indian National Rowing Championships ==
After a few years, the Rowing Federation of India was formed, primarily through the efforts of the members of the Madras Boat Club. In 1977 the first Indian National Rowing Championship was held in Calcutta. Tamil Nadu was represented by rowers from the Madras Boat Club. At the 1980 Nationals at Calcutta, MBC rowers helped Tamil Nadu win the gold in the Coxed Fours event.

The 1981 Nationals at Pune saw one of the best performances. The MBC team representing Tamil Nadu won four of the available six gold medals and was awarded the shield for the 'Best team in Tamil Nadu' by the Tamil Nadu Sports journalist's Association.

== International Games ==
At the 1982 Asian Games at New Delhi, rowing was introduced as a sport for the first time. The rowing events were held on the Ramgarh Lake in Jaipur. Several members of the MBC contributed in conducting this major event: Chacko Kandathil was one of the Indian coaches, Gopal Madhavan officiated as an International umpire, and S. Ravi and M. V. Sriram were selected to form part of the Indian team.

The year 1983 saw the Indian team participate in the World Rowing Championship for the first time, with Borun Chanda was the Chief Coach. The club had always extended its facilities to any organisation involved in the sport. Several of the nominees of the Tamil Nadu Amateur Rowing Association were permitted to use the club's facilities for the purpose of training.

== Female Participants ==
Changes were in store in 1988 as women began to prove their skills in the sport. Five girls, Vijaya Chari, Arati Rao, Gayatri Acharya, Pavitra Rao and Chatura Rao (cox), began training under national coach, Chacko Kandathil. They were put through a systematic pattern of training and the girls showed the greatest commitment. The efforts paid off, and for three years they emphatically dominated the women's rowing scene in the country, winning every national event during the period. In 1989 they were selected to represent India at the Asian Rowing Championships at Chandigarh, where they won two silver medals - lightweight and open. Later in 1990, they were again selected as the lightweight coxless four for the Asian Games, at Beijing. They thus became the first all-MBC crew to represent India. Their consistent performances earned them the shield for the 'Best team in Tamil Nadu' from the Tamil Nadu Sports Journalist's Association.

The eighties saw a phenomenal growth in the activities of the club. The number of members grew. What was a mere seventy-five at the turn of the century was by the early eighties over a six-hundred. This called for better administration. Again contributions came from several members. Raja Bangara, who has been President of the club for eight years in the recent past, is one of the significant contributors. He steered the club to safe waters and in the matter of finance, stood it firmly on its two feet.

== Modern Era ==
In the 1990s the club witnessed sweeping changes. The club acquired a number of modern facilities, and it is today proudly one of the best-equipped rowing clubs in the country. The club acquired a full complement of the latest boats and oars from U.S.A.

Today, the club faces new challenges. The very survival of the sport is threatened by the condition of the Adyar river. Besides the unchecked pollution that has been taking place, the river stands so badly silted that the stretches of water available for training and racing is far from what is required. Dredging has not only become imperative but urgent. The club finds itself in a position, unable to sort out these problems by itself and requires the active help of the government.

== See also ==
- Rowing Federation of India
- Official website

(Excerpted from https://www.angelfire.com/id/mbc/main.html - an unofficial and now defunct website of Madras Boat Club)
