= Royal–Thomian rivalry =

Sri Lankan school rivalry

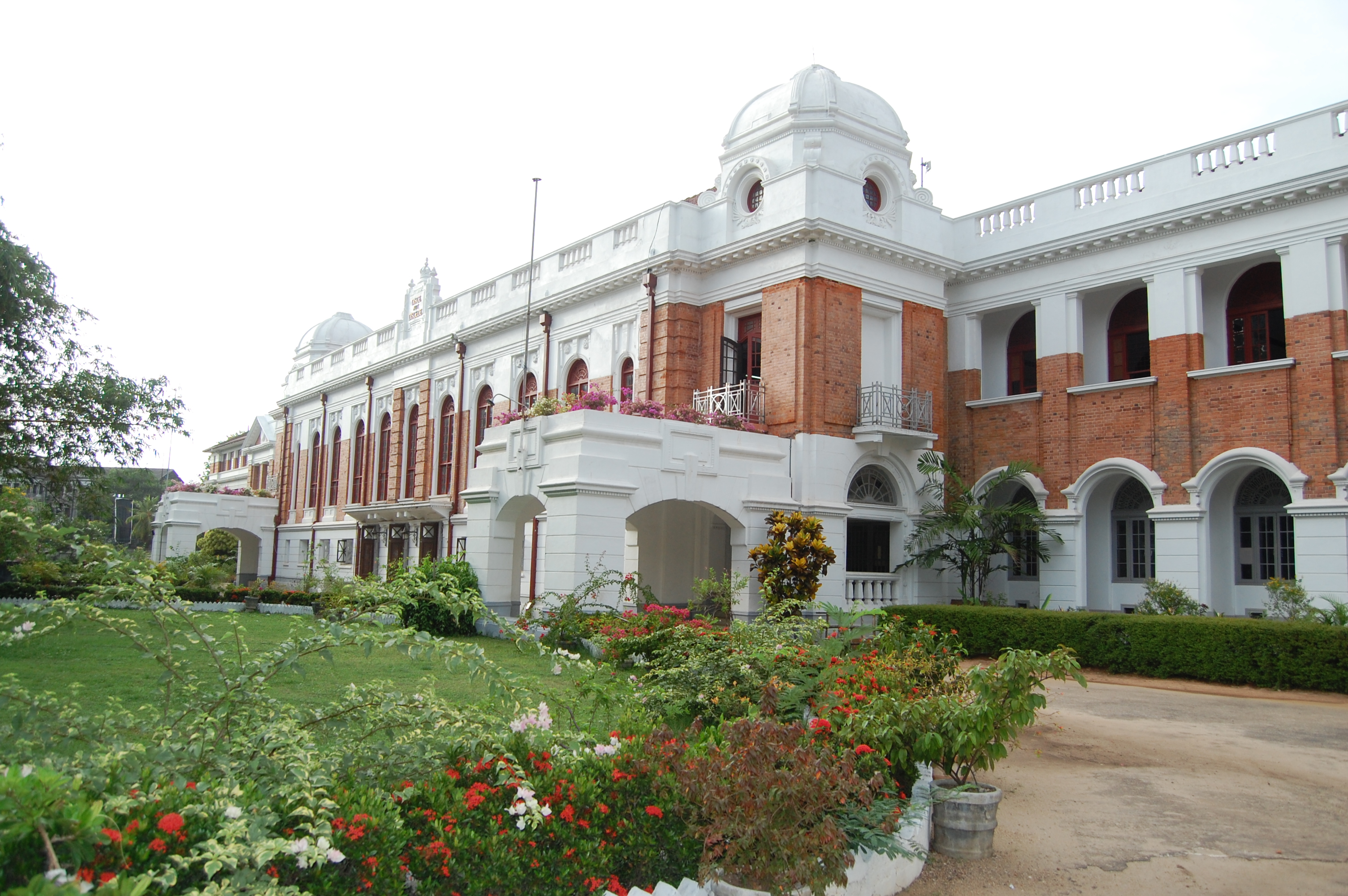
Royal College Main Building, the iconic symbol of Royal College Colombo

The Quadrangle of S. Thomas' College, Mt Lavinia.

The Royal–Thomian Rivalry refers to the competition, both in academics and sports, between Royal College Colombo and S. Thomas' College, Mt Lavinia, two boys' schools in Sri Lanka. Both schools have rich histories of academic excellence, as well as sport competition and school pride. Both were founded in the 19th century, and between them they have produced a large number of Sri Lanka's most prominent scientists, writers and politicians, as well as noted figures in many other fields.

The three oldest sporting encounters between the traditional rivals are the Battle of the Blues, the Royal-Thomian Rugby Encounter and the Royal Thomian Regatta.

== Background ==
Royal College, Colombo is a government-funded public school that accommodates approximately 8,000 students. S. Thomas' College, Mt Lavinia is an Anglican private school that has about 2,500 boys on roll and a branch network of three constituent colleges in Kollupitiya, Gurutalawa and Bandarawela with a total of over 5,500 students. Royal and S. Thomas' have been careful to preserve many parts of their proud history, retaining a number of traditions.

== Cricket ==
There is no Royal without S. Thomas' and no S. Thomas' without Royal!

— Bogoda Premaratne, former Principal of Royal College

=== Royal–Thomian (the Battle of the Blues) ===
Known simply as the Royal-Thomian, the cricket match has been played by the schools since 1879. This annual cricket match is played for the D. S. Senanayake Memorial Shield, and is affectionately known as the Battle of the Blues due to the colours of each school's flag. The first match was played between the Colombo Academy and St Thomas' College in 1879, thus was known as the Academy College match till 1881. The first match was played with schoolmasters participating as well as schoolboys. From 1880 onwards, only schoolboys were allowed to play in the match.

As of 2016, the tally stands as Royal having 35 wins and S.Thomas' with 35 wins. This is regarded as the most prestigious cricketing event in the country. The match itself is preceded by many activities including the legendary Cycle Parade which usually happens on the day before the big match, with the official objective of visiting the captain's house to encourage him.

=== Mustangs Trophy ===
Following the annual three-day match, known as the Big Match, the schools meet a week later for the limited overs match. First played in 1975, the match is played for the Mustangs Trophy, from which it gains its name.

The originators of this first match were three staunch Old Royalists, namely Mr. Lanka de Silva, Air Vice Marshal Harry Goonatilleka and Brigadier S. D. N. Hapugalle.

=== Twenty-20 ===
In 2010, as part of Royal College's 175th anniversary celebrations, the first ever Royal Thomian Twenty20 Cricket Encounter was organized for the J. R. Jayewardene Trophy at the P. Saravanamuttu Stadium (The Oval).

== Rugby ==
The Royal Thomian rugby encounter, held annually in the Michaelmas Term of S. Thomas and between the two sessions of Bradby Shield Encounter of Royal since 1955. Second only to the Bradby Shield Encounter (between Royal and Trinity) in prestigious rugby match in the country. It is played for the Michael Gunaratne Trophy.

== Rowing ==
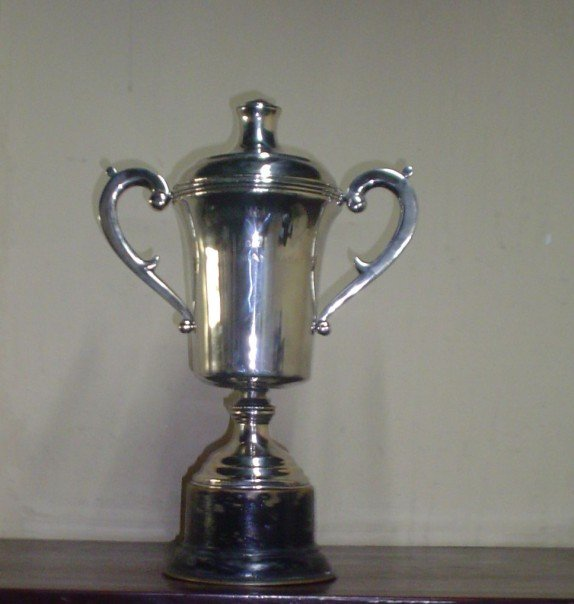
The T. N. Fernando Trophy, awarded annually to the overall winner of the Regatta

The Royal-Thomian Regatta is the annual regatta between the two schools. It is the third oldest Royal Thomian encounter after Cricket and Rugby. The Boat Race which is a coxed fours event initially began in 1962 and by 1966, it broadened out to give rise to the regatta having a card of eight events, made up of 2 Single Sculls, 2 Doublesculls, 2 Coxless Pairs and 2 Coxed Fours which the 'Boat Race' is the most prestigious. The events take place at the Beira lake (alongside the Colombo Rowing Club) in Colombo around October each year with the T. N. Fernando Trophy awarded to the overall winner

== Hockey ==
The Orville Abeynaike Memorial Trophy is an annual hockey match between Royal College, Colombo, and S. Thomas' College, Mount Lavinia in Sri Lanka. Although both schools began playing hockey in the 1960s and occasionally met in tournaments, the official encounter was introduced in the year 2000. Not only a U15 match but also Old boys' match is played too.

== Basketball ==
Since 2002, The annual Royal Thomian basketball encounter is played for the prestigious D.S Senanayake Trophy. Every year an old boys match is also played. S. Thomas' won the first match for the D.S Senanayake trophy. As of 2015, the tally stands as Royal having 5 wins and S. Thomas' with 8 wins.

Since 2012 an U 15 match is also played. Royal College won the first U 15 match. As of 2015, the tally stands as Royal having 2 wins and S. Thomas' with 2 wins.

== Water Polo ==
Begun in 1992, Dr. R.L. Hayman Trophy for Royal-Thomian Water Polo Matches has attracted a large following and are Asia's most attended Water Polo matches. Named after Dr R.L. Hayman (a former sub warden at S.Thomas' College) the water polo matches are held in two matches (Legs), initially played in both schools (at the Royal College pool in Colombo and at the S. Thomas' College pool in Mt. Lavinia) and since 2007 played in a neutral venue (Sugathadasa Stadium Swimming Pool) in the first and second week of October. This is the third most popular Royal-Thomian event by attendance after Cricket and Rugby.

== Boxing ==
The Senator Sir Cyril de Zoysa Shield of boxing is one of the most coveted boxing tournaments in the island. The shield was presented in memory of Sir Cyril de Zoysa, the former president of the Senate of Ceylon.

== Tennis ==
Though tennis has been played at both schools for over fifty years, the first inter-school annual tennis encounter was organized between Royal and S. Thomas in 2003. It is played for the E F C Pereira Memorial Cup.

== Swimming ==
In 2009 both schools have agreed to begin an annual Royal-Thomian Swimming Championship, with the inaugural to being in May 2009. The even is due to be held at the swimming pools of each school on alternate years. Overall champions of the meet will be awarded the Creon Corea Memorial Challenge Trophy named after the late swimmer who represented Royal College in the early 1980s. A unique feature of this meet will be the relay events included for old boys of the two schools and the champions will be awarded the OTSC Challenge Trophy.

== Sailing ==
The annual Royal Thomian Sailing Regatta began in 2014 for the prestigious Ranil Dias Memorial Trophy. The regatta consists of two individual races for the optimist boat class (Under 16) and the Laser boat class (Under 20) each carrying 2 points for the winning school, and 4 Team races for the Laser ‘A’ team and ‘B’ team and Optimist ‘A’ and ‘B’ team respectively, where the ‘A’ races carry 2 points each and the ‘B’ races carry a single point. The Thomians currently lead the tally with a margin of 6 wins to Royal College’s 2. The Regatta is held at the Ceylon Motor Yacht Club, Moratuwa and consists of two days.

== Football ==
The Royal Thomian Football encounter has been played since 1986. Officially known as the "Blue derby", the tally stands as Royal lead the encounter with 21 wins in 24 encounters. The Thomian winning 2 and drawing one. Their most recent victory coming in 2016, breaking a losing streak of 7years constructive. The Thomian captained by D.N.D Dias won a hard-fought game against royal on 4 November 2016 at Cr&FC grounds Colombo.

== Debates ==
Debates are held between both schools in the languages of English, Sinhala and Tamil.

== See also ==
- School rivalry
- Blue (university sport)
