= Sabdharatnajyoti Saravanamuttu =

Ceylon Tamil lawyer, politician, military officer, cricketer and sports administrator

Lt Col Sabdharatnajyoti Saravanamuttu MBE

Member of Colombo Municipal Council
- In office 1937–1946

Personal details
- Born: 1898 Colombo, Ceylon
- Died: 17 July 1957 Colombo, Ceylon
- Education: St Catharine's College, Cambridge
- Profession: Lawyer
- Ethnicity: Ceylon Tamil
- Cricket career

Cricket information
- Batting: Right-handed
- Bowling: Right-arm medium-fast

Domestic team information
- Years: Team
- 1912–1918: S. Thomas' College
- 1919–1920: Ceylonese
- 1923: Cambridge University
- 1923: Cambridgeshire
- 1924: Indian Gymkhana
- 1926–1938: Ceylon
- 1933–1934: Galle Cricket Club
- 1936–1937: Ceylon Cricket Association
- 1947–1948: MP Engineer's XI

Career statistics
Competition	First-class
Matches	6
Runs scored	148
Batting average	16.44
100s/50s	0/2
Top score	63
Balls bowled	120
Wickets	2
Bowling average	38.00
5 wickets in innings	0
10 wickets in match	0
Best bowling	2/26
Catches/stumpings	2/0
- Source: CricketArchive

Lieutenant Colonel Sabdharatnajyoti "Thambirajah" Saravanamuttu, MBE (1898 – 17 July 1957; also known as S. Sara) was a Ceylon Tamil lawyer, politician, military officer, cricketer and sports administrator.

== Early life and family ==
Saravanamuttu was born in 1898 in Colombo, Ceylon. He was the son of Vetharniam Saravanamuttu, a physician from Colombo. His mother's family were from Vaddukoddai in northern Ceylon. His paternal grandfather Vetharniam is reputed to be the founder of Chunnakam, a small town in northern Ceylon. Saravanamuttu had five eminent brothers: Ratnasothy, Nanasothy, Tharmasothy, Paikiasothy and Manicasothy. He was educated at S. Thomas' College, Mount Lavinia where he was captain of the cricket team (1916–18) and scored the fastest century in Ceylon. He was also head prefect and boxing champion at S. Thomas. He then joined St Catharine's College, Cambridge to study engineering. He played cricket at Cambridge between 1921 and 1923 but failed to win a blue for Cambridge University Cricket Club.

== Career ==
Saravanamuttu was a member of Colombo Municipal Council from May 1937 to December 1946. Saravanamuttu served in the Ceylon Defense Force during World War II, rising to the rank of lieutenant colonel. He was in command of one of the two Ceylon Light Infantry battalions deployed along the eastern coast of Ceylon to protect against Japanese invasion. After the war he qualified as a lawyer and practised law.

Saravanamuttu was captain of the Ceylon national cricket team twice and of Tamil Union Cricket and Athletic Club in 1934 and from 1936 to 1941. He played in the European-Ceylonese Test series and for Ceylon against Australia, New Zealand and Marylebone Cricket Club. He was president of the Board of Control for Cricket in Ceylon.

Saravanamuttu was made a Member of the Order of the British Empire in the 1953 Coronation Honours. He died on 17 July 1957 in Colombo aged 59.
