= Oswald Leslie De Kretser II =

Oswald Leslie De Kretser II, CMG

Puisne Justice of the Supreme Court of Ceylon
- In office 1938–1945

Personal details
- Born: 7 June 1882 Colombo, Ceylon
- Died: Colombo, Ceylon 11 November 1959
- Education: Royal College Colombo, University College, Colombo

Oswald Leslie De Kretser II, CMG (7 June 1882 – 11 November 1959) was a Ceylonese (Sri Lankan) judge. He was a Puisne Justice of the Supreme Court of Ceylon.

Born to Oswald Leslie De Kretser I a District Engineer of Public Works Department, Ceylon; he was educated at the Royal College, Colombo. In 1905 he became an Advocate of the Supreme Court of Ceylon and began his legal practice.

In 1924 he became the District Judge of Batticaloa, District Judge Chilaw in 1925, served in the Judicial Service Commission in 1935. In 1936 he served as the Additional District Judge Colombo and Acting District Judge Jaffna as well as Acting Solicitor General. He was also the Commissioner of Assize in Negombo, Kalutara, Ratnapura and Jaffna. In 1938 he was made an acting puisne justice and retired from the Supreme Court in 1945. For his service he was made a Companion of the Order of St Michael and St George.

He married Ruby Irene Leah Shirley Thomasz. One of his sons, Oswald Leslie De Kretser III also became a judge of the Supreme Court of Ceylon.
