= Oswald Leslie De Kretser III =

Sri Lankan judge

Puisne Justice of the Supreme Court of Ceylon
- In office 1968–1972

Personal details
- Born: 21 January 1910 Colombo, Ceylon
- Education: Royal College Colombo, University College, Colombo

Oswald Leslie De Kretser III was a Ceylonese (Sri Lankan) judge. He was a judge of the Supreme Court of Ceylon.

Born to Oswald Leslie De Kretser II a Puisne Justice of the Supreme Court of Ceylon, he was educated at the Royal College, Colombo. There he won the Governors Prize for Latin Prose, Director's Prize for Classics, the Harward Prize for Ancient History and Cecil Perera Prize for History. Entering the University College, Colombo in 1928, he gained a BA from the University of London and became a proctor in 1937.

Between 1940 and 1943, he served as a Crown Counsel and Assistant to the Legal Secretary of Ceylon and went on to join the Ceylon Judicial Service as an Acting Magistrate in Chilaw in 1943. There after he was appointed acting Additional Magistrate Colombo in 1944, acting Magistrate Jaffna in 1945, District Judge Tangalle in 1947, District Judge Balapitiya in 1949, District Judge Chilaw and Puttalam in 1950, District Judge Nuwara Eliya in 1952 and District Judge Panadura in 1953. In 1968 he was appointed to the Bench of the Supreme Court, holding the post until his retirement in 1972.

He was the President of the Light Opera Society of Ceylon and had the honor of having a rare species of fish, Malpulutta kretseri, named after him. He was married to Sonia Jean Marshall, they had four children. A daughter is the award-winning Australian novelist Michelle de Kretser.
