= Paikiasothy Saravanamuttu =

Ceylon Tamil civil servant and sports administrator

Paikiasothy Saravanamuttu CCS
- பாக்கியசோதி சரவணமுத்து
- Born: 26 October 1892
- Died: 28 May 1950 (aged 57)
- Education: University of London
- Occupation: Civil servant

Paikiasothy Saravanamuttu (Tamil: பாக்கியசோதி சரவணமுத்து,Sinhala: පාකියසොති සර්වනමූත්තු; 26 October 1892 – 28 May 1950; also known as P. Sara) was a Ceylonese civil servant and sports administrator.

== Early life and family ==
Saravanamuttu was born on 26 October 1892. He was the son of Vetharniam Saravanamuttu, a physician from Colombo in Ceylon. His mother's family were from Vaddukoddai in northern Ceylon. His paternal grandfather Vetharniam is reputed to be the founder of Chunnakam, a small town in northern Ceylon. Saravanamuttu had five brothers: Ratnasothy, Nanasothy, Tharmasothy, Manicasothy and Saptaranajyoti. He was educated at S. Thomas' College, Mount Lavinia where he won many prizes including the Victoria Gold Medal. He was also a member of the school's athletics, cricket and football teams. After school he received a BA degree from the London University. Saravanamuttu taught at Royal College, Colombo for a brief period. He then joined Fitzwilliam College, Cambridge in 1915 in preparation for entering the Indian Civil Service but family circumstances forced him to leave before finishing his course.

Saravanamuttu married Sybil Thangam, daughter of Muttusumaru, a crown proctor from Puttalam. They had two sons (Baski and Chandri) and a daughter (Sakuntala). Baski's son, also called Paikiasothy, is the head of the Centre for Policy Alternatives.

== Career ==
After returning to Ceylon Saravanamuttu joined the Ceylon Civil Service in 1919 as a cadet, initially working at Colombo Kachcheri. Serving in various locations, he rose up the rank of the civil service. He was Assistant Government Agent for Mullaitivu District (1926) and Hambantota District. He later served as a judicial officer in Badulla, Kalutara, Kegalle and Kurunegala He joined the Ministry of Agriculture and Lands in 1946 and was appointed commissioner of the Tea Control and Rubber Control departments. He spent millions of public money in these roles and was believed to the highest paid civil servant in the country. He was offered the Companion of the Order of St Michael and St George honour in the 1946 New Year Honours list for his services during the war but he declined.

After retirement in 1946 Saravanamuttu entered politics. He contested the 1947 parliamentary election as an independent candidate in Colombo South but failed to get elected. The winner of the election, Reginald Abraham de Mel, subsequently lost his seat after being found guilty of corrupt practices by aiding, abetting, counselling and procuring the offences of impersonation in an election petition filled by Saravanamuttu. Saravanamuttu contested the ensuing by-election held in Colombo South in November 1948 but again lost, this time to Theodore Frederick Jayewardene.

Saravanamuttu is mostly remembered for his association with the Tamil Union Cricket and Athletic Club which he helped develop. He was president of the club from 1948 to 1951. He helped build the club's new ground, the Colombo Oval which was renamed Paikiasothy Saravanamuttu Stadium in 1977. The P. Sara Trophy, an inter-club cricket competition, ran from 1949 to 1982. Saravanamuttu was head of the Ceylon Cricket Association (1937–50) and the first president of the Board of Control for Cricket in Ceylon (1949–50).

Saravanamuttu died on 28 May 1950.
