= R. L. de Kretser =

Sri Lankan cricketer (born 1920)

Robert Lloyd de Kretser (born 30 September 1920, date of death unknown) was a Sri Lankan cricketer.

De Kretser was born in Ceylon in September 1920. His most famous feat was catching Don Bradman off B.R. Heyn for 20 in the All-Ceylon vs Australia match in 1948. De Kretser also went on to get the wickets of Miller & Loxton in the same game. De Kretser is deceased.
