= Manicasothy Saravanamuttu =

Sri Lankan journalist and diplomat

Manicasothy Saravanamuttu (Tamil: மணிகசோதி சரவணமுத்து (died 1970) was a Sri Lankan journalist and diplomat in Malaya. He was the editor of The Straits Echo, Penang (1931–1941), and was credited with 'saving' Penang during Japanese invasion in 1941.

== Early life ==
He was born into a prominent Jaffna Tamil family in Ceylon (later Sri Lanka). Manicasothy and his brothers went to St. Thomas' College, Colombo, where they distinguished themselves as cricket players. He won a scholarship to study at St. John's College, Oxford. His father Dr. Saravanamuttu was the family doctor to the young S. W. R. D. Bandaranaike, who later became Prime Minister of Ceylon. Manicasothy's eldest brother, Ratnajothi, later known as Sir Ratnasothy Saravanamuttu, was a medical practitioner who became the first elected Mayor of Colombo. He was knighted for staying at his post when the Japanese bombed Colombo on Easter Sunday 1942 and reorganising the public services when the port area was evacuated in the panic that followed the bombing. His fourth brother Paikiasothy Saravanamuttu or P. Sara was Rubber and Tea Controller during the Second World War. He served as president of the Ceylon Cricket Association for about 14 years and the Paikiasothy Saravanamuttu Stadium, also known as the P Sara Oval or Colombo Oval, was named after him.

== Journalist in Penang ==
After retiring from his post at the Ceylon Independent of Sir Marcus Fernando, Saravanamuttu was editor of an independent Penang newspaper The Straits Echo (1931–41) and managing editor of North Malayan Newspapers.

== Japanese occupation ==
During the Japanese invasion of Malaya in December 1941, bombs were dropped on Penang. As the British had evacuated, Manicasothy took charge of raising the white flag at Fort Cornwallis, thus declaring Penang an 'open city'. He was accompanied by Harold Speldewinde and Gopal, who climbed the flagpole to take the flag down. He became chairman of the Penang Service Committee which had its headquarters at 10 Scott Road. He pressed the Penang Volunteers, who had been left behind with arms, into service to act as Volunteer Police; this was made up largely of the Eurasian Volunteer Company under Capt. Willweber and the Chinese Company. Manicasothy gave orders for saving the rice, clearing away the dead, safeguarding and issuing petrol, and forming the guards to preserve order and prevent looting. For all this, Manicasothy became known as the man who 'saved' Penang at the outbreak of the Japanese invasion. He was interned during the Japanese Occupation.

== Diplomat ==
Manicasothy served as Ceylon's Commissioner in Singapore and Malaya (1950–1957), Minister Plenipotentiary and Envoy Extraordinary to Indonesia (1954–1957) during which time he was involved in organising the Asian-African Conference, better known as the Bandung Conference, in 1955 and Honorary Consul-General in Bangkok (1958–61).

== Family ==
Manicasothy was known as Mr Saravanamuttu, 'Sara' or 'Uncle Sara'. In Sri Lanka, he had a son Lakshman and a daughter, Manorani Saravanamuttu, who founded the Centre for Family Service (CFS) in Sri Lanka after her son Richard Manic de Zoysa, journalist, author, human rights activist and actor, was abducted and killed in 1990. In Penang, Manicasothy had two sons.

== Memoirs ==
Manicasothy's memoirs entitled The Sara Saga, with a foreword written by Malcolm MacDonald, were originally published in 1970. They were dedicated to his grandson Richard Manic. The memoirs contain Manicasothy's recollections of Tunku Abdul Rahman and Malayan independence.
