= Beira Lake =

- බේරේ වැව (Sinhala); பேரே ஏரி (Tamil)
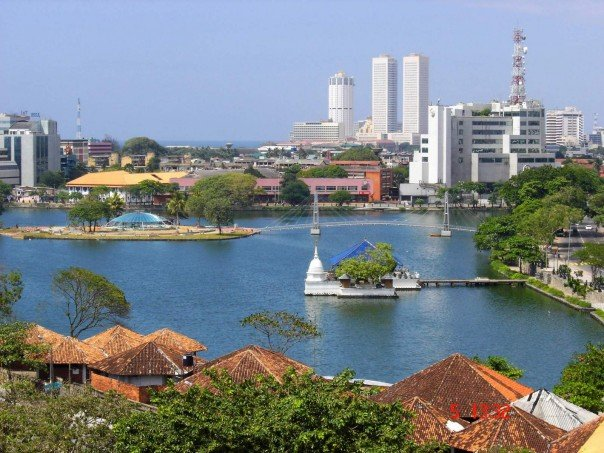
- Beira Lake in 2007, with the WTC twin towers in the background.

- Location in central Colombo
- Location: Colombo
- Coordinates: 6°55′45.9624″N 79°51′15.0552″E
- Type: Reservoir
- Primary inflows: Kelani River via St. Bastian Canal
- Primary outflows: Indian Ocean via Mc.Callum Lock Gates at Colombo Harbour (northwest) and via a semicircular spillway (west)
- Basin countries: Sri Lanka
- Surface area: 0.654 km^{2} (0.253 sq mi)
- Average depth: 5.6 m (18 ft)
- Max. depth: 5.6 m (18 ft)
- Water volume: 2,903,000 m^{3} (102,500,000 ft^{3})

Beira Lake (/ˈbeɪrə/; Sinhala: බේරේ වැව, romanized: Bērē væva (IPA: [beːreː ˈʋæʋə]); Tamil: பேரே ஏரி, romanized: Pērē ēri (IPA: [peːɾeː eːɾi])) is a man-made lake in the centre of the city of Colombo in Sri Lanka. The lake is surrounded by many large businesses in the city. It initially occupied approximately 1.65 km^{2} (0.64 sq mi) of land 100 years ago but has since been reduced to 0.65 km^{2} (0.25 sq mi) today due to various reasons. During the Portuguese, Dutch and English colonial era, the lake was used for a wide variety of purposes. It still retains its Portuguese name. It is connected to many intricate canals which provided an easy way of transporting goods within the city and suburban cities.

== Etymology ==
The derivation of the name is uncertain, yet it was as recent as 1927 that 'Beira Lake' first appeared on maps. Before that, it was called the 'Colombo Lake' or just 'The Lake'. One theory is that it got its name from a Portuguese engineer named 'Beira' who worked in constructing the lake or from a Dutch engineer named 'De Beer'. The idea of De Beer is supported by a granite plaque which was recovered from the sluice of the lake, inscribed "De Beer 1700".

Another theory is that it was named from the word 'Beira', which in Portuguese meant the 'Bank or Edge of the Lake. Another idea is that it got its name from 'De Beer, which in Portuguese meant the 'Anchoring Point. It may also have also been named after the Portuguese province of the same name.

== History ==
The lake was built by the Portuguese to provide protection to Colombo from enemies, mainly local kings.

By 1518, the Portuguese ruled over Colombo, but the increasing threats against Portuguese rule by King Vijayabahu VII and Sinhalese forces made them look for better solutions other than their modern weaponry. One of such early ideas was making a huge moat around the fort.

The construction of the moat began by digging the marshy land which was around the fort in all directions other than west (west of the fort was the Indian Ocean). But these works were demotivated by the size of it and the small amount of water in the marsh which was not enough to fill a lake. But a stream which flowed between Mount of Dematagoda and Mount of St. Bastian was discovered by Portuguese Captain Lopo de Brito, while he was chasing away another invasion led by King Vijayabahu VII. After informing the officials at the fort about this stream, it was connected to the moat they had dug, creating Beira Lake.

Then the lake was completely connected with the sea from both sides, separating the Colombo Fort from the mainland. All means of transportation between the mainland and the fort was done using boats. The original area of the lake was 1.61 km^{2} (0.62 sq mi). Primary outflows then were the Kayman's Gate to the east and St. John's Canal to the west. It was bordered from Mount of St. Bastian, Mount of Wolvendaal and from Mount of Kochchikade. To the north and west of the lake were the Portuguese forts. The nature of the lake then has been described in Conquista Temporale Espiritual de Ceylão (1687) by Fr. Fernão de Queyroz:

"The lake around the City of Colombo is having a complete length of 10 1/2 miles. It which had the Mount of Lawrence was surrounded by a lagoon. In some places at summer time it was deep only to the waist, and was a lake which gave access to City of Colombo"

In 1578, Mayadunne of the Kingdom of Sitawaka attempted to cut off supplies to the invaders but failed to drain the lake. His son Rajasingha I (a.k.a. Sithawaka Rajasinghe) succeeded in 1587 in draining the crocodile infested lake by cutting off several canals but failed to defeat the Portuguese as they brought reinforcements from India through sea.

After the Dutch laid siege and captured the lake it was expanded by reducing the fort by 1/3 of the previous and created several islands such as the Slave Island: some of them were large enough to have a village and a plantation of 600 coconut trees. After the British took control they removed the crocodiles and developed the area surrounding the lake for recreational activities such as rowing and yachting. The area around the lake was popular for parties including a grand ball that was held to celebrate the news of British victory in Waterloo. Ceylon's first botanical garden the Kew Gardens was opened on Slave Island in 1810 to cultivate seedlings provided by the Royal Botanic Gardens at Kew in London to be planted in Peradeniya Botanical Gardens.

By the 19th century land reclamation for development began and the land area of the lake was reduced, pollution also began to increase.

== Basins and canals connected ==
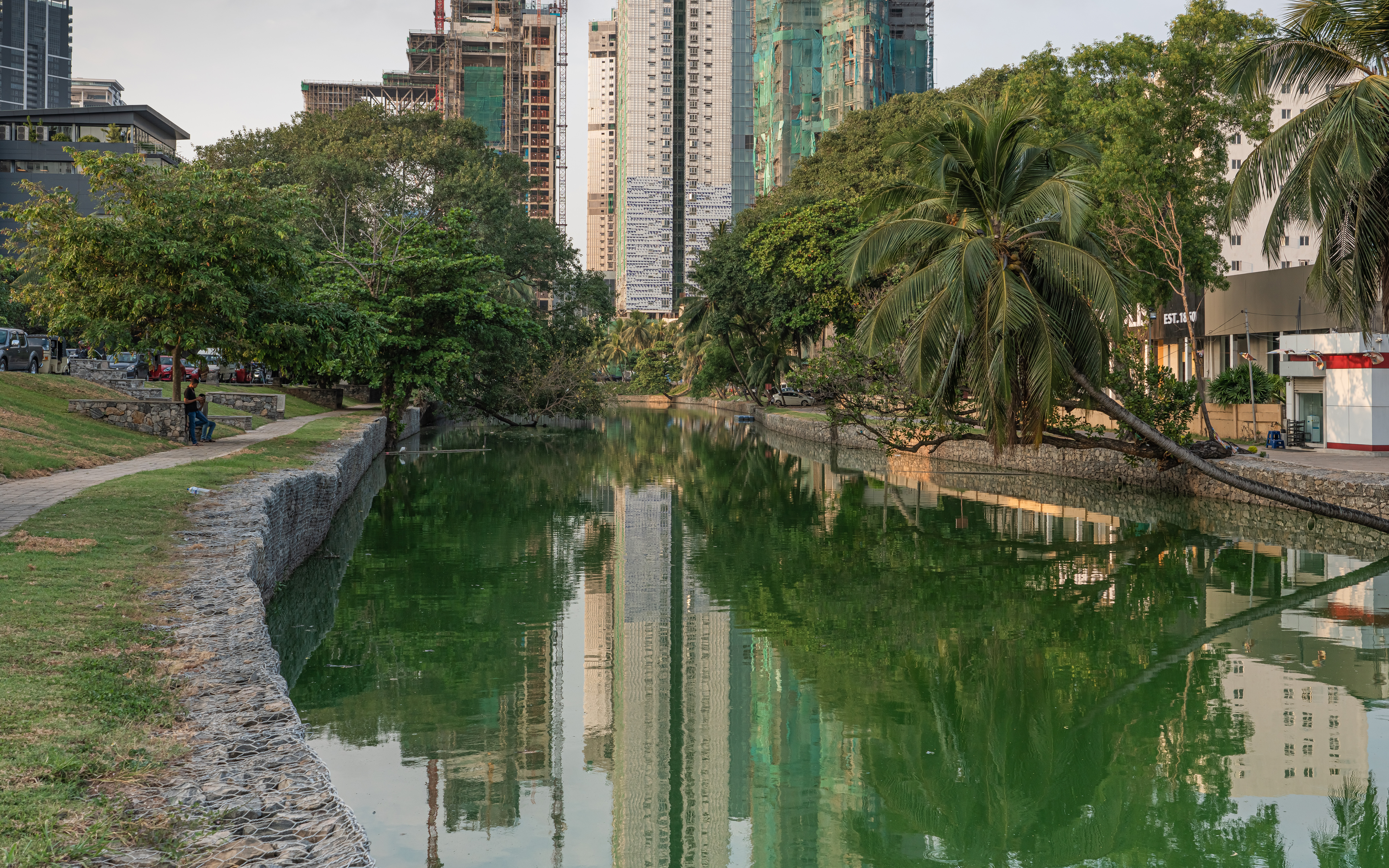
Beira Lake canal

Four main basins can be identified in the lake:

Basins of Beira Lake
Lake Basin	Surface Area	Maximum Depth	Volume
East Lake	0.433 km^{2} (0.167 sq mi)	5.6 m (18 ft)	945,000 m^{3} (33,400,000 ft^{3})
Galle Face Lake	0.026 km^{2} (0.010 sq mi)	3.4 m (11 ft)	N/A
West Lake	0.081 km^{2} (0.031 sq mi)	3.4 m (11 ft)	1,795,000 m^{3} (63,400,000 ft^{3})
Southwest Lake	0.114 km^{2} (0.044 sq mi)	2.9 m (9.5 ft)	163,000 m^{3} (5,800,000 ft^{3})

The only canal the lake connected to is St. Bastian Canal from its northeast end. From the northwest, it outflows to the Indian Ocean via Mc. Callum Gates and via a semicircular spillway to the west (commonly known as "බේරේ බේසම" translit. Bērē bēsama =Beira Basin).

== Greater Beira ==
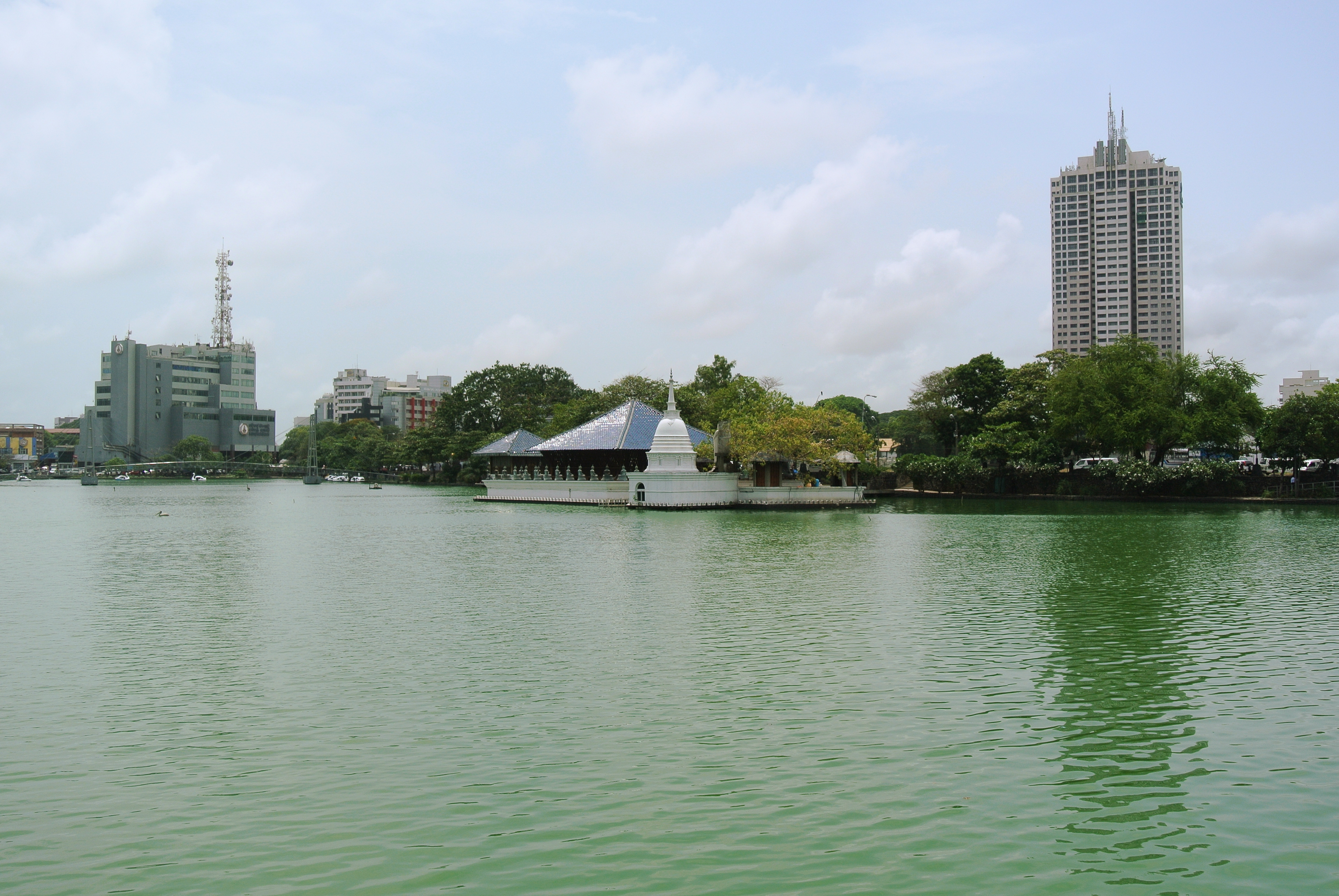
The Southwest lake in the daytime with Gangaramaya Temple in the middle

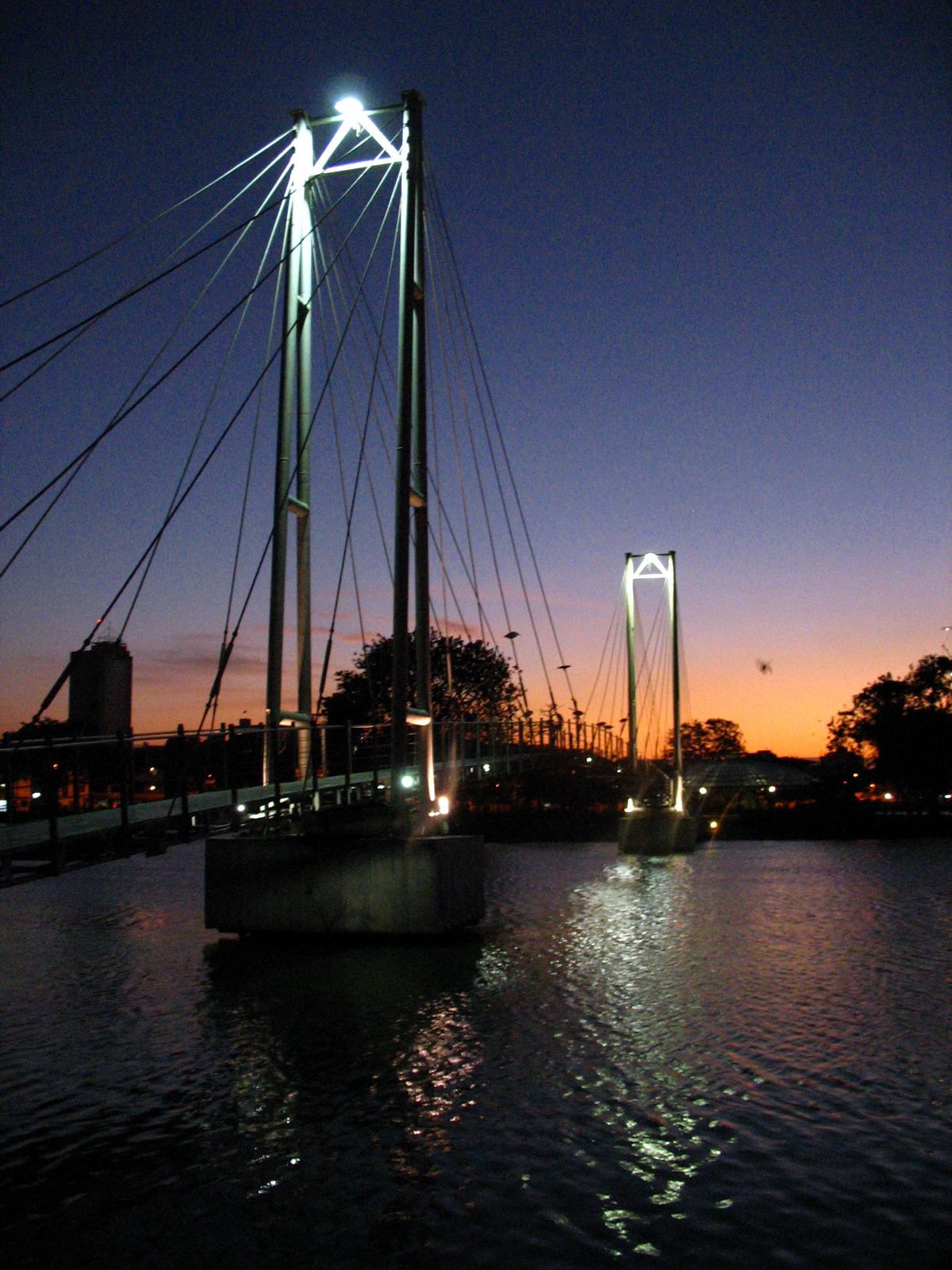
The pedestrian footbridge over the southwest lake

Lined with many large warehouses, reminiscent of its past when tea used to be transported to the port of Colombo on barges via the port access canal, the lake now is very quiet with many of the warehouses having been abandoned.

With maximum length of 1.6 km (1 mi) the lake has been home to Colombo Rowing Club for over 140 years.

The Sri Lanka Exhibition and Convention Centre is located on the waterfront, further the People's Bank and the Inland Revenue Department headquarters are located in close to the lake.St. Joseph's college Colombo, the only school in Sri Lanka to have its very own Rowing pier is situated on the banks of the Beira lake. The Associated Newspapers of Ceylon Limited is housed in the nearby "Lake House" building.

The lake with many government owned properties has been earmarked for development including a casino district on its McCullum road water front.

== Flora and fauna ==
The lake is home to species of storks, pelicans, monitor lizards and various species of fish.

== Pollution ==
The lake gets its famous green colour and unusually bad odour due to the result of pollution over hundreds of years and algae that is present in the water. The bad smell is mostly prominent during dry weather, due to the high rates of evaporation and it fades off with the arrival of the rainy season.

=== Water Quality ===
Water of Beira Lake is polluted, from which it gets a bad odour and green colour. But contrary to the canal system of Colombo, the lake contains water with a very alkaline pH value got by primary production and continuous bloom. In August it gets its maximum value, but becomes more neutral from top to bottom, pH value decreasing from 10 to 8. The lake water never gets an acidic pH.

Conductivity of the water retains fairly stable between 250 μS/cm and 300 μS/cm, with a slight increase from May to August.

Full temperature ranges between 29.3 and 35.4 °C (84.7 and 95.7 °F). Average temperature is 31 °C (88 °F) and August is the warmest month. The temperature decreases rapidly 2 or 3 °C (36 or 37 °F), from the surface to 60–100 cm (24–39 in) in-depth and remains stable after that.

Dissolved oxygen generally follows the same trend as temperature in August. Likewise the thermocline, an oxycline appears exclusively in August. Below 1 m (3 ft 3 in) depth, dissolved oxygen is stable at 7 mg/L (2.5×10^{−7} lb/cu in) during May, June and July. Though it is decreased during August from 13 mg/L (4.7×10^{−7} lb/cu in) to 6 mg/L (2.2×10^{−7} lb/cu in), shallow depth allows preserving a sufficient level of oxygen. But it would be more stressful during dry season.

Salinity is very stable (around 0.12 g/L (4.3×10^{−6} lb/cu in)) over time and along the water column.

== Beira Lake Restoration ==
The Beira Lake plays a major role in the Western Region Megapolis Project. Under the project the Beira lake is expected to be cleaned and developed with Singaporean assistance and private sector involvement. Waterways will be cleared by blocking illegal water outlets and sewerage lines into the lake and relocating settlements that dump waste to the lake in the area to social housing units. Under the Megapolis plan after the restoration a shopping district, an entertainment district and a promenade will be created in the area around the Beira lake alongside many hotels and mixed development projects.
