= Lynn de Silva =

Sri Lankan theologian (1919–1982)

Lynn Alton de Silva
- de Silva in the 1970s
- Born: 16 June 1919; Kurana, British Ceylon
- Died: 22 May 1982 (aged 62); Colombo, Sri Lanka
- Resting place: Colombo, Sri Lanka
- Education: Union Theological Seminary in the City of New York (S.T.M); University of Birmingham (M.A), United Theological College, Bangalore, Senate of Serampore (B.D, Th.D)
- Occupations: Methodist minister and Director of the Ecumenical Institute for Study and Dialogue
- Known for: Buddhist and Christian interfaith dialogue
- Title: Reverend Doctor
- Spouse: Lakshmi Sirima née Mendis
- Children: 4

Lynn Alton de Silva (16 June 1919 – 22 May 1982) was a Sri Lankan theologian and Methodist minister. He was the founder and editor of one of the first theological journals on Buddhist–Christian encounter called Dialogue (1961–1981), chief translator for the revision of the Old Testament of the Sinhalese Bible published as New Sinhala Bible (1973–1982), and director of the Ecumenical Institute for Study and Dialogue (EISD) in Sri Lanka (1962–1982). Lynn de Silva is widely regarded as one of the foremost Christian practitioners of Buddhist–Christian dialogue in Sri Lanka, and also as one of the pioneers in this dialogue.

Lynn de Silva's book titled Buddhism: Beliefs and Practices in Sri Lanka (de Silva 1974) was mentioned in two journals in the early 1980s as being unparalleled as an introduction to Buddhism in Sri Lanka. Possibly his most notable contribution to theology is the book titled The Problem of the Self in Buddhism and Christianity (de Silva 1979), in which he points out an age-old misconception held by Buddhists and Christians that the notion of an immortal soul is a biblical teaching. This book is considered by Perry Schmidt-Leukel to be one of the classics in Buddhist–Christian dialogue, and one which has become well known among those actively involved in this dialogue. The book was also included in John Hick's Library of Philosophy and Religion series.

Lynn de Silva's father and three of his brothers were Methodist ministers. According to Walter Small, Lynn de Silva and his brothers Fred and Denzil were among the most significant Methodist writers during the period 1931–1964 in Sri Lanka. After entering active service in the Methodist ministry in 1946, de Silva pursued his tertiary education, obtaining qualifications including a Bachelor of Divinity degree, two Master's degrees, and a Doctor of Theology degree. In addition to serving in the ministry, de Silva participated for twenty years in the dialogical and ecumenical activities of the World Council of Churches, and he was Executive President of the Presidium of the National Council for Religion and Peace in Sri Lanka (1979–1980). He died shortly after this role while addressing an audience at a conference, having continued to work until the end. In 1999, the Study Center building of the EISD was dedicated to the memory of Lynn de Silva and Rev. G. B. Jackson, the first director of the EISD.

== Family, education and career ==
Lynn Alton de Silva was born to a Methodist family on 16 June 1919, in the town of Kurana in Katunayake, Sri Lanka. His father, John Simon de Silva (1868–1940), was a Methodist minister, and his mother, Clara de Silva, was a housewife. Lynn de Silva was the second youngest out of one sister: Pearl (died 1999), and five brothers: Frederick Stanley (1904–1980), Roy, George Denzil (died 1996), Eric and Hugh. Little is known about de Silva's childhood, except that he had a Christian upbringing, growing up under the influence of pious parents. Lynn de Silva and three of his brothers—Fred, Denzil, and Roy—grew up to become Methodist ministers. Hugh de Silva died whilst studying to be ordained.

=== Education ===
Before being accepted as a candidate for the ministry, de Silva was a teacher from 1938 to 1942. In 1942, he trained for the ministry at the United Theological College in Bangalore, and entered active service in the Methodist ministry in 1946. He served as a minister in stations including Kollupitiya, Wellawatte, Kandy, Badulla, Galle, Kalahe, Mutwal and Seeduwa; he served a total of two years at the first two stations, half a year at Kandy, two years at Kalahe, three years at Mutuwal, and three and half years at Seeduwa. In September 1950, de Silva was ordained as a Methodist minister.

Lynn and Lakshmi in the early 1950s

A few months after being ordained, Lynn de Silva married Lakshmi Mendis, on 3 February 1951, at the Colpetty Methodist Church in Colombo. Toward the end of the year, on 16 November 1951, Lynn and Lakshmi had their first son, Lahan Jayalath de Silva.

Starting from the 1950s, de Silva pursued his tertiary education. He obtained a Bachelor of Divinity (B.D.) degree from United Theological College under Senate of Serampore College (University) in India; a Master of Sacred Theology (S.T.M.) degree from the Union Theological Seminary in the City of New York; a Diploma in Buddhism, with a specialisation in Theravada Buddhism, from the Vidyalankara University in Sri Lanka; a Master of Arts (M.A.) degree from University of Birmingham in England; and a Doctor of Theology (Th.D.) degree from Senate of Serampore College. He also took a study course in Mahayana Buddhism at the Vidyodaya University in Sri Lanka. During his studies, Lynn and Lakshmi had their second son, Lalith Chrishantha de Silva, on 16 September 1954.

=== Career and activities ===
Lynn de Silva's pioneering work in Buddhist–Christian dialogue, and his work in Bible translation, began in the early 1960s after he had completed his service at Seeduwa. In 1962, de Silva was appointed to serve the National Christian Council at the Study Centre for Religion and Society in Wellawatte, which later became the Ecumenical Institute for Study and Dialogue—an important center for Buddhist studies. It was shortly before starting work at the Study Center that Lynn and Lakshmi had their third child, Shiromi Priyala de Silva (later Rodrigo), on 3 September 1961.

Whilst managing the Study Center, de Silva was appointed co-translator of the Sinhala Bible Revision Committee in 1964. The committee consisted of around forty scholars, including Protestant and Roman Catholic clergy, Buddhist monks, and academics. From 1964 to 1973, the committee focused on translating the Greek version of the New Testament of the Bible into Sinhalese. In the same year in which de Silva started working with the translation committee, Lynn and Lakshmi had their last child and third son, Shantha Asiri de Silva, on 6 March 1964.

Lynn de Silva with his family in 1977, at his eldest son's wedding. (Left to right) Shantha, Lakshmi, Lahan, Peace, Lynn, Lalith and Shiromi

Around the age of fifty, in the late 1960s, de Silva experienced a severe heart attack. During his recovery, Lakshmi managed the home, watched over his health, and moderated his appointments. Furthermore, she guided the work at the Study Center by handling most of the administrative duties, organisation of conferences, and publication related tasks. She continued to take these responsibilities even after de Silva's recovery, so that he could focus on his research, writing and travel.

From 1970 to 1971, de Silva lived in England with Lakshmi while he served the World Churches as William Paton Lecturer at Selly Oak Colleges in Birmingham. While in England, de Silva was also a Visiting Lecturer in Asian Religions at University of Bristol.

After his return to Sri Lanka, de Silva continued with Bible translation work, and he was appointed chief translator of the Old Testament into Sinhala in 1973. Fr. Aloysius Peiris S.J. states the following in relation to de Silva's new position as chief translator:

His proficiency in his own mother-tongue coupled with his familiarity with Greek and Hebrew, as well as a thorough grounding in biblical theology, gave him an eminent position in the team that made the new Sinhala translation of the Bible. It was thanks to his ruthless criticism that many traditional Christian terms in Sinhala ... were eliminated from Biblical and liturgical use. He pointed out as nobody did before, such words when uttered in a Buddhist context, distort the Gospel message whilst doing violence also to the Sinhala language.

Lakshmi de Silva also played an important role in the Bible translation work. After three months of training, she was appointed secretary of the translation committee. Her role in the committee involved technical work such as proofreading, and clerical work such as typing and dealing with the press. She possessed sufficient knowledge in Greek and Hebrew to be able to check the accuracy and consistency of the Bible translation, which she continued at a full-time capacity even after she had fallen ill toward the latter part of her life. With the experience she had gained, Lakshmi compiled valuable material for use in future bible translations. Although she possessed the skills necessary to become a scholar in her own right, she was content to take a back seat to support her husband's work. She died in 1980, just over a year before the Sinhala Bible translation was completed.

Lynn de Silva in the early 1980s with some family and extended family

Lynn de Silva's ecumenical responsibilities included membership in the Committees of the World Council of Churches (WCC) that focused on the Christian approach to other faiths. In particular, he was a WCC committee member (Paris 1962, Geneva 1967 and 1973); a member of the working group of the Division of World Mission and Evangelism (Mexico 1963, Zurich 1966 and Cantebury 1969); and member of the working group on Dialogue with Faiths and Ideologies (DFI) since 1969. Some of his other significant ecumenical activities were visits to Buddhist study centres in Germany, England and the USA, and study tours of Buddhism in Burma, Thailand, Singapore, Hong Kong and Japan.

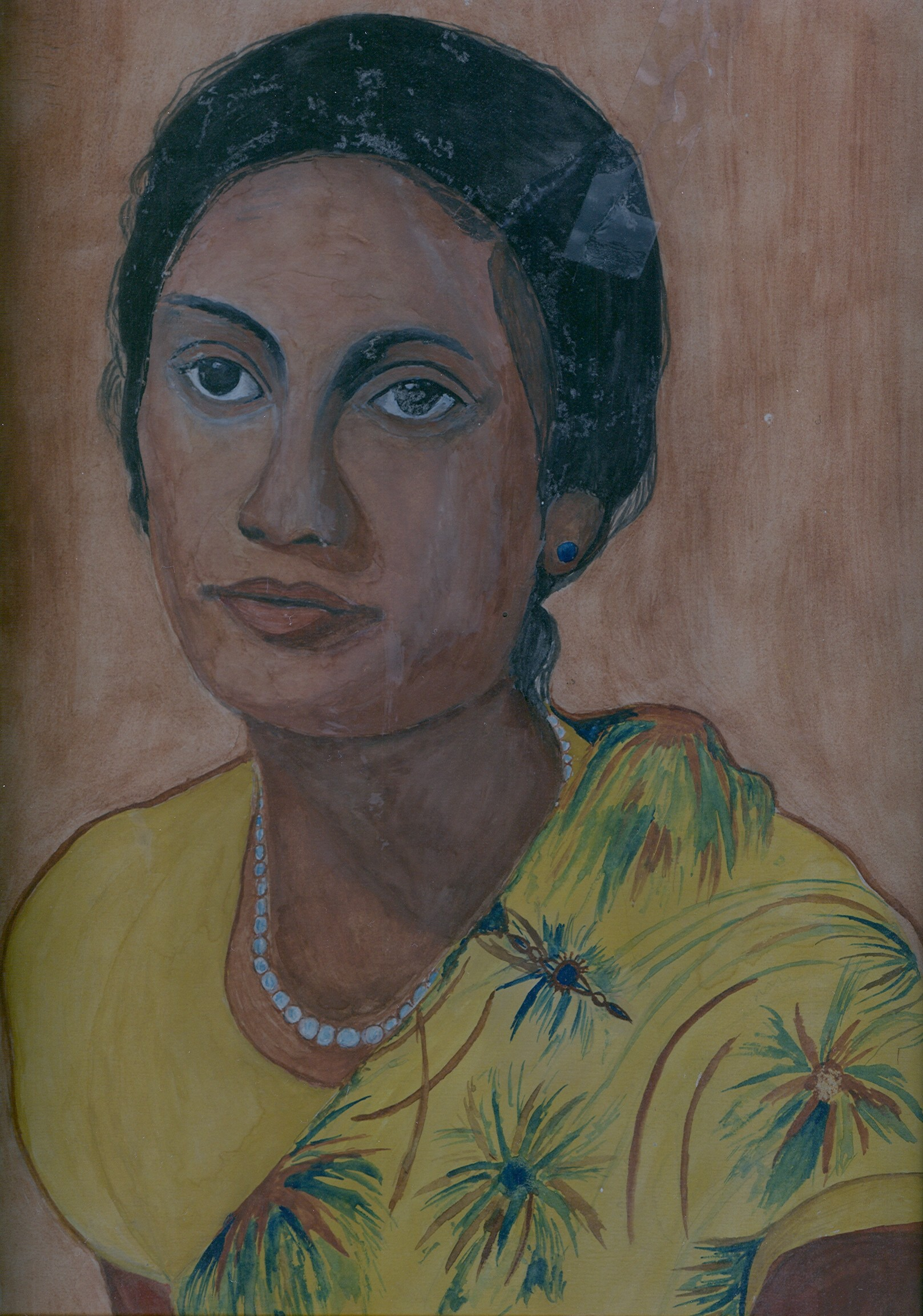
Lynn de Silva painting of his wife, Lakshmi de Silva

Lynn de Silva's quest for unity stretched beyond his dialogue with Buddhists. He was among a group of people that led the movement for the "contextualisation and inculturation of the Gospel," and also among those who "advocated and struggled for Church Union in Sri Lanka." After interracial riots in 1977 between the Sinhalese and Tamils, de Silva became deeply involved in issues of unity and reconciliation between the two cultures. He led a team of Sinhalese leaders for dialogue with the Tamils in Jaffna, and wrote articles on the history of the conflict as well as his analysis of it, in an effort to promote interracial understanding. In 1979, de Silva was appointed to the Presidium of the National Council for Religion and Peace in Sri Lanka, where he was Executive President for one year. Some of his other non-ecumenical activities included serving as editor of the Methodist Witness and Suba Hasun Sinhalese journals.

Lynn de Silva's interests included writing Sinhalese short stories (e.g., Premaoushadaya (de Silva 1952a) and Premaye Rahasa (de Silva 1952b)) and painting. One of his paintings had appeared at an exhibit held at the Lionel Wendt Gallery in Colombo, Sri Lanka. In addition to his proficiency in English and Sinhalese, de Silva was familiar with Greek and Hebrew, and literate in Pali.

== History of Buddhist–Christian relations in Sri Lanka ==
Ever since the 16th century, during colonisations of Sri Lanka by the Portuguese, Dutch and English, Christian missionaries had attempted to convert the Buddhist population into Christianity, with the general belief during this period being that there was nothing worthy of study in non-Christian religions. In the early 19th century, this view started to change, into the conviction that every evangelist should have sound knowledge in Buddhism. The most prominent Christian scholars supporting this conviction were Daniel John Gogerly, C. H. S. Ward, and Robert Spence Hardy.

Despite their belief that knowledge in Buddhism was essential, their attitude toward Buddhism was still negative. Through their polemical writings, they revealed their negative attitudes and beliefs that Buddhism was in error and that Christianity should replace Buddhism. This antagonised the Buddhists, and eventually led to a national Buddhist movement, starting from controversies held at Baddegama (1865), Udanwita (1866) and Gampola (1871). The last and most popular of these controversies was the historic debate Panadura Vadaya, held in Panadura (1873), between Rev. David de Silva and Migettuwatte Gunananda Thera. One of the rules of the debate was that Christians should try to prove that Buddhism is false, and vice versa.

Gradually, this negative attitude between Buddhists and Christians started to change. The main influences responsible for the change included (1) more accurate knowledge of Buddhism than was available in the past; (2) interest in and appreciation for Buddhism shown by Western scholars such as Arthur Schopenhauer, whose philosophy was similar to that of the Buddha; (3) the book by Edwin Arnold titled The Light of Asia, which created a popular interest in Buddhism; (4) the Edinburgh Missionary Conference of 1910, which set the tone for a new Christian ecumenical movement; (5) missionary activities of Buddhists such as Anagarika Dharmapala in the West; and (6) the Tambaram Missionary Conference in 1938, where one of the main themes for discussion was Christian message in a non-Christian world.

Perhaps the first Methodist missionary to practice this more positive attitude toward Buddhism was Rev. Stanley Bishop, who made his attitude evident in a book titled Gautama or Jesus (1907). In the introductory chapter, Bishop states:

The apparently wide differences between the teachings of Gautama Buddha and of Jesus Christ have led many to suppose that there is very little in common between the two systems. Some have even been entrapped into the statement that Buddhist doctrine is in direct opposition to Christianity, or vice versa, and that there is no common ground upon which the Buddhist and the Christian may meet for mutual help. It is hard for anyone who is at all conversant with Buddhism to maintain the position so often adopted – that the Christian has nothing to learn and all to teach. Neither statement is based on anything surer than ignorance....These pages are written in an attempt to show that although the Christian may receive much light and stimulus from the teaching of the Buddha, the Buddhist may receive from Christ what Gautama was never in a position to give.

Another significant step toward dialogue between Christians and Buddhists was by Daniel T. Niles, in his book Eternal Life Now (1946). The purpose of this book is twofold: (1) to convey the Christian message in the Buddhist context, by using terms such as anicca, dukkha, samsara, sarana, anatta, sila, samadhi, panna, and arahant; and (2) to convey Buddhist truths within the context of Christianity.

With the resurgence of Buddhism after Sri Lankan independence, the conviction grew even stronger for the need to consider Christianity in the light of a culture and heritage that is predominantly Buddhist, which led to an increased need for dialogue between the two religions. Consequently, the Study Center for Religion and Society, which was later renamed to Ecumenical Institute for Study and Dialogue (EISD), was established in Colombo in 1951. The center was initially managed by Rev. G. B. Jackson, and later directed by Lynn de Silva, whose focus was on Buddhist studies.

=== Ecumenical Institute for Study and Dialogue ===
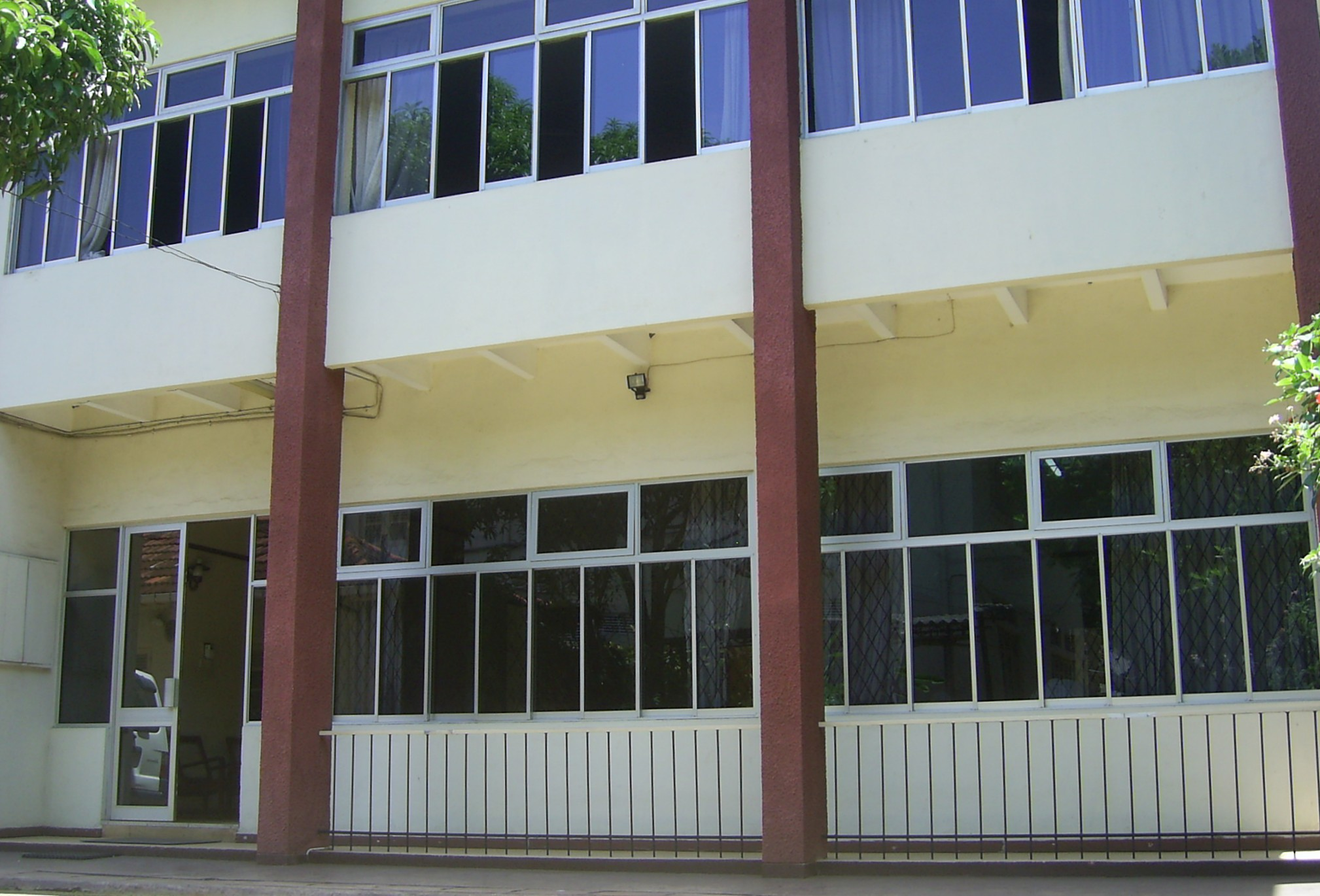
The new Ecumenical Institute for Study and Dialogue building erected after Lynn de Silva's death, with funds that he had collected

Lynn de Silva was the director of the Study Center for Religion and Society from 1962. The center was organised into two divisions: Division of Buddhist Studies, and Division of Frontier Studies. The purpose of the former division was to promote study and research in Buddhism, while the purpose of the latter division was to explore the theological and social implications of the Christian faith in Sri Lanka. The center was involved in successfully organising a number of dialogues, meetings, and seminaries, and it became an internationally recognised center for dialogue with Buddhism and other ecumenical concerns. Furthermore, the center was recognised in the 1970s and 1980s as one of the most active of all similar study centres worldwide.

In 1977, the center was renamed to Ecumenical Institute for Study and Dialogue (EISD), and set up as an autonomous body separate from the control of religious bodies and institutions. Although the primary focus was maintained on Buddhist–Christian studies and dialogue, a third additional division called Division of Studies of other Faiths and Ideologies was established to initiate studies in other religions. In addition to publishing books and papers on dialogue between Christianity and other religions, the EISD published the Dialogue journal on a quarterly basis, which was founded and initially edited by Lynn de Silva.

=== World Council of Churches assembly at Nairobi ===
The assembly at Nairobi in 1975 of the World Council of Churches was an important milestone in the history of inter-religious dialogue. For the first time, representatives from five different faiths were present at the gathering, and the discussions were centred around the topic of inter-religious dialogue.

At a session that emphasised "seeking community" with people of other faiths, cultures and ideologies, the presentations were driven by, as the former director of the WCC sub-unit Dialogue with People of Living Faiths and Ideologies (DFI) – S. J. Samartha – put it: "fear of losing the 'uniqueness' of Christ, fear of weakening the sense of 'mission', and the persistent fear of 'syncretism'." Presentations at this session were marked by conflicting opinions between a group of European theologians and a group of Asian and African theologians, which resulted from the conflicting viewpoints between the theologies practised by the two groups. While the Europeans voiced their fear of inter-religious dialogue, the African and Asian participants called for a more definite endorsement of dialogue.

According to Sperber and de Alwis, de Silva was, in this debate, one of the leading voices in the Asian viewpoint. S. J. Samartha notes de Silva's contribution as "one of the most powerful interventions in the Assembly in support of dialogue," and Carl Hallencreutz describes it as "the personal witness of an experienced theologian from Sri Lanka."

In his speech to the general assembly at Nairobi, de Silva asserted that his concern was to alleviate the fear voiced by Europeans about dialogue which, he claimed, arises in people who have not lived among people of other faiths. He argued that the spirituality of others can be shared without diminishing one's loyalty to one's own faith. Further, he argued that dialogue is a safeguard against syncretism, not a temptation to syncretism, and that Asian Christians should overcome the obstacles that separate one religion from another, and seek to express the Christian faith in the thought-forms and life-forms of Asia.

In a publication titled Freedom from Teutonic Captivity (Dialogue, New Series, Vol. 3, No. 1), de Silva shared his thoughts on the Nairobi debate, and he presented the significance of the debate as follows:

1. It revealed the strength of the Afro-Asian solidarity in their commitment to dialogue; 2. it revealed more clearly than ever before that the Third World Churches will no longer tolerate being dictated to by the Western Churches; 3. it revealed their determination to break away from teutonic captivity and discover the Christ who "Frees and Unites" in the living context of Asian and African religions.

== The Asian theology of Lynn de Silva ==
Lynn de Silva gained an interest in Buddhism and its culture at an early stage in his ministry. He believed that the credibility of Christianity depended on its ability to relate to Buddhism, which was the faith of the majority of the Sri Lankan population. His objective was to develop a richer appreciation of the similarities between Buddhism and Christianity, in particular, to communicate the Christian message in a manner that the Sri Lankan culture understood, and to construct a theology that is focused towards the Buddhist cultural environment. To this end, he used Buddhist concepts to communicate Christian beliefs in a language understood from the Buddhist context, and he aimed at extending Christian theology with Buddhist concepts to gain a more thorough understanding of Christianity.

To obtain the necessary background in Sri Lankan Buddhist practices, de Silva consulted reputed Buddhist monks and scholars, visited Buddhist places of worship, and consulted written sources on Sri Lankan Buddhism. Although most of his studies were completed in English, he took a special effort to master Sinhalese and the Sri Lankan culture. Furthermore, he became proficient in Pali, the language of the Buddhist scriptures. His findings eventually led to the book titled Buddhism: Beliefs and Practices in Sri Lanka (de Silva 1974), which is widely cited in religious literature (e.g.,). According to two journals, this book was unparalleled as an introduction to Buddhism in Sri Lanka in the early 1980s, and it was also the most complete, thorough and sensitive book on Buddhism in Sri Lanka, resulting in it generally being recommended by professors and monks as a standard book on Buddhist practices in Sri Lanka.

=== Anattā and pneuma ===
In 1979 de Silva released a book titled The Problem of the Self in Buddhism and Christianity (de Silva 1979), which has since been cited extensively (e.g.,) and attracted reviews from international journals (e.g.,). This book was also considered by Aloysius Pieris to be de Silva's most outstanding contribution to Theology, and by Perry Schmidt-Leukel to be one of the classics in Buddhist–Christian dialogue, and one that has become well known among those actively involved in this dialogue. Furthermore, this book was included in John Hick's Library of Philosophy and Religion series. In this book, de Silva compares the biblical notion of "the soul" (pneuma) or "the self," with the Buddhist doctrine of "no soul" (anattā) or "no self." Contrary to popular belief, de Silva shows that modern Christian scholarship does not support the notion of a soul as an immortal entity separate from the body. He argues that such a misconception arose as a consequence of the translation of the Bible into Greek. Based on his observation, de Silva shows how the Buddhist doctrine of anattā is complementary to the Christian notion of personal identity – pneuma. He distinguishes that, while pneuma focuses on man as a relational entity, anattā focuses on man as an isolated entity. Furthermore, de Silva infers that if we do consider anattā to be real in Buddhism or Christianity, pneuma must also be real for Nibbāna or the Kingdom of God to be a positive ideal.

In his review of de Silva's book, Joseph Kitagawa argues that de Silva is too narrow in his analysis of the anattā doctrine; he claims that a better analysis would have been for de Silva to take into consideration the broader implication of the anattā doctrine, and to challenge the very basis of Greek philosophy which had influenced much of Christian theology. Furthermore, Kitagawa argues that de Silva could have entertained the possibility that Theravada Buddhism might look for Ultimate Reality more readily in the Mahayana Buddhist tradition, rather than turning towards Christianity. In Donald Mitchell's analysis of the same book by de Silva, he states that a better framework for dialogue with Hindu traditions could be allowed if de Silva considered an expanded hermeneutical circle that includes a more positive notion of soul that is compatible with the biblical understanding of man. By doing so, Mitchell argues, de Silva would be able to "include inherently valuable insights from the Christian tradition on the nature of man."

From the evangelical theologians, Tissa Weerasinghe believed that de Silva needs to put more emphasis on the "glaring disharmony" between Christianity and Buddhism that their differing views on the biblical notion of soul suggest. In relation to de Silva's treatment of this notion, Dyrness states that insights into the biblical picture of human life apart from God cannot be found by a dialogue with Buddhism, but by Christian Asians carefully considering the Scriptures and their own Asian setting. A similar perspective is taken by Lim et al., who insist that de Silva should communicate the Christian message to the Buddhists, instead of giving Buddhist meanings to Christian concepts and harmonising in a syncretistic way the concepts belonging to the two religions. In a publication that aims at an evangelical approach to religions and cultures, Yung interprets de Silva's contribution as not so much an able exercise in dialogue, but, rather, a brilliant Christian apologetic, addressed to Theravada Buddhists.

=== Salvation ===
With an inclusivistic view on religion in the early stages of his career, Lynn de Silva believed that salvation does not only apply to Christians, but also to other religions. He maintained that while Christians can use Christ as their means for salvation, other religions can use their own means for salvation. Later in his life, de Silva developed more of a pluralistic view on religion, believing that neither of the two religions is superior to the other. Schmidt-Leukel notes how this change of view is evident in de Silva's posthumous article Buddhism and Christianity Relativised, in volume 9 of the Dialogue journal.

In her doctoral thesis containing a chapter on de Silva's work, Damayanthi Niles claims that there is a problem with de Silva's argument in relation to salvation, in that it "reconciles the exclusive Christ-event and the inclusive vision of God's salvific plan purely on Christian terms," and that it does not take the "religious visions and commitments of other faiths seriously." Furthermore, she argues that de Silva's understanding of salvation, as found in his paper Non-Christian Religions and God's Plan of Salvation (de Silva 1967b), borrows a religious idea from other religions and uses the idea to make Christianity more palatable to other religions and to Christians sensitive to pluralism.

=== Thanatology ===
In the last few years before his death, de Silva focused his study towards the study of human death, namely, the field of thanatology. His quest was motivated mainly by the death of his wife Lakshmi in December 1980, but also by his curiosity about the meaning of resurrection. With this frame of mind, de Silva studied the beliefs and practices of people with respect to death, such as the phenomenon of mediums, with help from Buddhist exponents of reincarnation. Although traces of his findings can be seen in his last writings, de Silva died before completing his study. His last findings were published posthumously by his friend and colleague, Fr. Aloysius Pieris S.J., in the paper Buddhism and Christianity Relativised, which appeared in volume 9 of the Dialogue journal.

In this paper, de Silva talks about "Life Beyond Death," and writes that theologians should not ignore data from parapsychology. He urges that evidence about the paranormal is compelling, and that it is a field that merits careful study. Regarding purgatory, de Silva states in this paper that the Hindu/Buddhist view, where Ultimate Reality is reached through a process of purification through liberation from self and elevation to stages of spiritual development, is more acceptable than the belief in a single life on earth and an everlasting hell or heaven after death. Furthermore, he insists that the Hindu/Buddhist view conforms to modern theological as well as psychical research. In agreement with the Hindu/Buddhist view, de Silva regards purgatory to be a place of cleansing, which ultimately makes a person ready for eternal life in Heaven.

Tissa de Alwis, in his Th.D. thesis studying the works of Lynn de Silva, argues that "de Silva's attempt to harmonise Rebirth, Purgatory, and an intermediate state, which is a kind of a continuum in which one passes from a near state of annihilation to the closest union with God, is inconsistent with the radical picture of Biblical anatta"; furthermore, de Alwis states that de Silva "fails to define lostness in the final sense and slides into an unrestricted universalism."

== Death and legacy ==
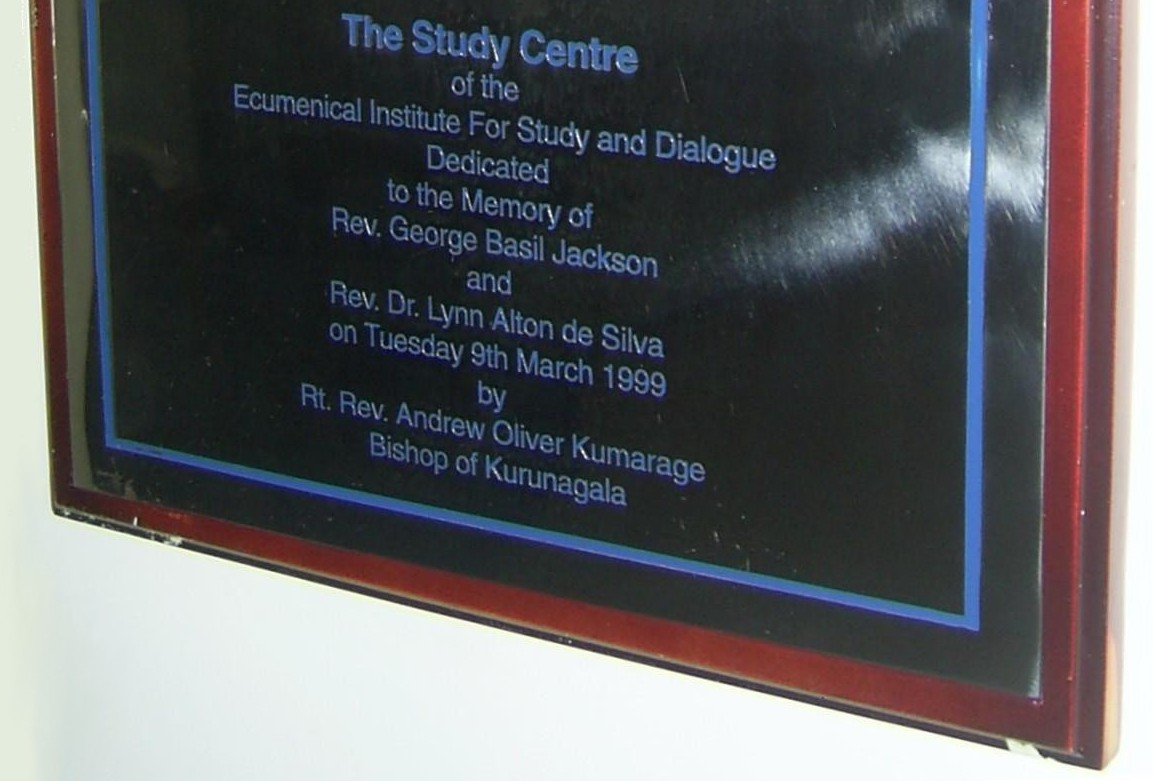
A plaque dedicating the Study Center to the memory of Rev. G. B. Jackson and Lynn de Silva

On 22 May 1982, while addressing the audience at a conference, Lynn de Silva succumbed to cardiac arrest. The conference was organised by the National Christian Council on the theme "Jesus Christ, Life of the World". Being the third and final speaker, he completed his discourse on 2 Timothy 3: 15–17 and he stood up again to answer a question from the audience, but he was barely able to formulate a reply and sat back in his chair. He died soon afterward, having continued to work until the end.

After Lynn de Silva's death, the EISD was directed by Rev. Kenneth Fernando, and currently (as of 2008) directed by Marshal Fernando. Aloysius Pieris, a Jesuit priest who had been collaborating with de Silva since 1968, and who in partnership with de Silva had officially been responsible for editing the New Series of Dialogue, continued to work as editor of the journal after de Silva's death. A sister-in law of Lynn de Silva, Langanee Mendis, who was trained by de Silva as his secretary after the death of his wife Lakshmi, continues to work (as of 2008) as the Administrative Secretary at the institute. Mrs. Mendis is credited as being the main person responsible for the uninterrupted functioning of the institute after Lynn de Silva's death. Furthermore, she was considered by Pieris in 2003 to be "a tower of strength [for the Ecumenical Institute] for well over 20 years."

In March 1999, the Study Center building of the EISD was dedicated to the memory of Rev. G. B. Jackson and Lynn de Silva, by Rt. Rev. Andrew Oliver Kumarage (Bishop of Kurunegala). This building is used by a number of institutions and church-related organisations to provide accommodation for participants involved in study programs at the EISD. On 17 November 2009, an article in the Daily News newspaper promoting World Philosophy Day featured a picture and short description of Lynn de Silva, alongside other Sri Lankan philosophers such as K. N. Jayatilleke and Ananda Coomaraswamy.

== Publications ==
=== Selected books and papers ===
- de Silva, Lynn A. (1950), Purana Darshanaya (Sinhalese), Colombo, Sri Lanka: M.D. Gunasena
- de Silva, Lynn A. (1961), Lukge Subaranchi Pradipaya (Sinhalese), Colombo, Sri Lanka: Committee for Publication of Christian Literature
- de Silva, Lynn A. (1964), Creation, Redemption and Consummation in Buddhist and Christian Thought, Chiang Mai, Thailand: Thailand Theological Seminary
- de Silva, Lynn A. (1968), Reincarnation in Buddhist and Christian Thought, Colombo, Sri Lanka: Christian Literature Society, ASIN B0006C3NP6
- de Silva, Lynn A. (1974), Buddhism: Beliefs and Practices in Sri Lanka, Colombo, Sri Lanka: Wesley Press, ASIN B0000CQC8X
- de Silva, Lynn A. (1979), The Problem of the Self in Buddhism and Christianity (Second Ed.) [First edition published by the Study Center for Religion and Society, Colombo, 1975], London: Macmillan Press, ISBN 978-0-333-23660-4
- de Silva, Lynn A. (1980), Lakdiva Pariharaika Buddhagama (Sinhalese), Colombo, Sri Lanka: Ecumenical Institute for Study and Dialogue
- de Silva, Lynn A. (1952a), Premaoushadaya (Sinhalese), Colombo, Sri Lanka: Liberty Press
- de Silva, Lynn A. (1952b), Premaye Rahasa (Sinhalese), Colombo, Sri Lanka: Salvation Army Press
- de Silva, Lynn A. (1967b), Hayward, Victor E. W. (ed.), "Non-Christian Religions and God's Plan of Salvation", Study Encounter, 2, 3, WCC: 61–67

=== Lynn de Silva as subject ===
- de Alwis, Tissa Brian (1982). Christian-Buddhist Dialogue in the Writings of Lynn A. de Silva (Th.D. thesis). Andrews University, USA: University Microfilms International.
- Dornberg, Ulrich (1992), "Lynn A. de Silva", Searching Through the Crisis: Christians, Contextual Theology and Social Change in Sri Lanka in the 1970s and 1980s, Colombo: Center for Society and Religion: 137–140
- Balasundaram, Franklyn J. (1994). The prophetic voices of Asia. Colombo: Center for Society and Religion. pp. 107–115.
- Höhensteiger, Petrus (1998). Mit Buddha und Christus auf dem Weg (an anthology of six major writings of Lynn de Silva). Freiburg: Herder.
- Niles, Damayanthi Mercy Arulratnum (1998). Religion and the Christian Faith in South Asia: A Critical Enquiry into the Writings of Hendrik Kraemer, Lynn de Silva & M. M. Thomas with Regard to the use of Understandings of Religion in the Theological Task (Ph.D. thesis). University of Chicago, USA: University Microfilms International.

== See also ==
- Stanley Jedidiah Samartha
- Joshua Russell Chandran
- Paul David Devanandan
- Leonard Swidler
- John Hick
- D. S. Amalorpavadass
- Roger Corless
- Ecumenical Institute for Study and Dialogue
