= Shantha Francis =

20th and 21st-century Sri Lankan Anglican bishop

Right Reverend Gregory Shantha Kumar Francis
- Anglican Bishop of Kurunegala
- Church: Anglican Church of Ceylon
- Diocese: Kurunegala
- In office: 2010 – December 2014
- Predecessor: Kumara Illangasinghe
- Successor: Keerthisiri Fernando
- Previous post: Archdeacon

Orders
- Ordination: 1980 by Lakshman Wickremasinghe
- Consecration: 21 December 2010

Personal details
- Born: 1955 (age 70–71) Polgahawela, Sri Lanka

Gregory Shantha Kumar Francis served as the Anglican bishop of Kurunegala.

Gregory Shantha Kumar Francis was born in 1955 in the village of Polgahawela, Sri Lanka. He is an upcountry Tamil, and fluent in Sinhala, English and Tamil.

Francis was appointed as deacon in 1978, receiving his Bachelor of Theology from the University of Serampore the same year. In 1980 he obtained a postgraduate diploma in pastoral and clinical counselling from Nawa Jeewana Institute of Psychology, Colombo and was ordained as a priest in the Church of Ceylon. He was the chaplain at Hillwood College, Kandy (1993–2000), Trinity College, Kandy (2001–2004). Francis also obtained a higher diploma in comprehensive drug abuse prevention and counselling from the Anti Narcotic Association of Sri Lanka.

On 7 November 2010 Rowan Williams, archbishop of Canterbury, appointed Francis as the fifth bishop of Kurunegala in the Church of Ceylon, succeeding retired Bishop Kumara Illangasinghe.

In 2012, Francis was nominated by the International Counter Narcotic Association to be a consultant on rehabilitation and counselling.

On 6 January 2015 the archbishop of Canterbury, Justin Welby, announced that Francis had resigned as Bishop of Kurunegala. In a statement by Francis he advised that he had been threatened by Tamil diaspora groups opposing his stand for a unitary state and the sovereignty of the country.

Francis is married to Priyadharshin and has two sons, Prabath and Pramith.

Church of England titles
Preceded by Kumara Illangasinghe	Bishop of Kurunegala; 2010 – 2015	Succeeded by Keerthisiri Fernando
