= Andrew Kumarage =

Sri Lankan bishop

Right Reverend Andrew Oliver Kumarage
- Anglican Bishop of Kurunegala
- Church: Anglican Church of Ceylon
- Diocese: Kurunegala
- In office: 1984 – 2000
- Predecessor: Lakshman Wickremasinghe
- Successor: Kumara Illangasinghe

Orders
- Ordination: 23 May 1959
- Consecration: 6 May 1984

Personal details
- Born: 16 January 1934 Hewadiwela
- Died: 21 April 2012 (aged 78) Kurunegala

Andrew Oliver Kumarage (16 January 1934 – 21 April 2012), (BDiv, DipRE), was the third Bishop of Kurunegala, Sri Lanka.

== Biography ==
Andrew Kumarage was born on 16 January 1934, the eldest child in a family of five. His father, Stephen, was a teacher and his mother, Mary, a nurse, who both worked as lay ministers for the Church of Ceylon. Kumarage was identified by the then Bishop of Kurunegala, Lakdasa De Mel, as a prospective leader for the Church and an early candidate for ordination. In 1954 he went to study theology at Bishop’s College, Calcutta in India and after four years of study he received a degree of Bachelor of Divinity. In 1958 Kumarage returned to Kurunegala and was subsequently made a Deacon on 1 May that year. On 23 May 1959 he was ordained as a priest in the Diocese of Kurunagala.

Kumarage was an inaugural faculty member at the Theological College of Lanka. He was also selected as the Chairperson of the Board of Governors at Trinity College, Kandy and served on the Governing Body of the CMS Schools. Kumarage subsequently trained at the Westhill College of Education in Birmingham, England, where he completed a Diploma of Religious Education. Upon his return to Sri Lanka he was made responsible for Religious Education in the Diocese of Kurungala.

On 6 May 1984 he was consecrated as the third Bishop of Kurunegala, succeeding Bishop Lakshman Wickremasinghe.

Kumarage participated in the United Religious Organization's "Journey for Harmony", studying religious strife and fear in Sri Lanka.

After 16 years he retired as bishop in 2000. In the years following his retirement he wrote and published a book on the Disciples of Jesus and later compiled a Personal Book of Prayers for Clergy. He was also appointed as the Chair of the Board of Management of the Ecumenical Institute for Study and Dialogue and remained a member of the EISD Board until his death.

Kumarage died on 21 April 2012 at the age of 78.

== See also ==
- Church of Ceylon
- Bishop of Kurunegala

== Bibliography ==
- A Priest's Book of Private Devotions (Kurunagala: Privately Published, 2005)

Church of England titles
Preceded by Lakshman Wickremasinghe	Bishop of Kurunegala; 1984 – 2000	Succeeded by Kumara Illangasinghe
