= Diocese of Kurunegala =

The Diocese of Kurunegala is a jurisdiction within both the Catholic Church and the Anglican Church of Ceylon.

- Diocese of Kurunegala (Catholic)
- Diocese of Kurunegala (Anglican)
