= Kumara Illangasinghe =

Sri Lankan bishop

Right Reverend Kumara Illangasinghe
- Anglican Bishop of Kurunegala
- Church: Anglican Church of Ceylon
- See: Anglican Diocese of Kurunegala
- In office: 2000 – 2010
- Predecessor: Andrew Kumarage
- Successor: Gregory Shantha Kumar Francis
- Previous post: Principal at Theological College Of Lanka

Orders
- Ordination: 1971 by Lakshman Wickramasinghe
- Consecration: 2000

Personal details
- Born: Sri Lanka

Kumara Illangasinghe, (B.Sc., B.D., M.Litt.) is a former Anglican Bishop of Ceylon. After his ordination in 1971, he served in parishes including Thalampitiya, Rathmeewela and Aragoda. After that, he was appointed as the chaplain of Trinity College, Kandy.

Illangasinghe was the principal of the Theological College of Lanka between 1992 and 1999.

In 2000 he was consecrated as the fourth Bishop of Kurunegala, following the retirement of Bishop Andrew Kumarage.

He is married to Dr. Lakmini Illangasinghe.

== See also ==
- Church of Ceylon
- Bishop of Kurunegala

Religious titles
Preceded by Andrew Kumarage	Bishop of Kurunegala; 2000 – 2010	Succeeded by Gregory Shantha Kumar Francis
