= Keerthisiri Fernando =

- Bishop Emeritus of Kurunagala
- Church: Anglican Church of Ceylon
- Diocese: Kurunegala
- In office: 2018–2022
- Predecessor: Gregory Shantha Kumar Francis
- Previous post: Archdeacon of Nuwara Eliya

Orders
- Ordination: 30 November 1990
- Consecration: 6 January 2018

Personal details
- Born: Wannakuwatte Mitiwaduge Devapriya Keerthisiri Fernando; 5 May 1961 (age 65) Colombo, Sri Lanka
- Spouse: Arlene
- Children: Sethsara, Sethlath
- Education: Prince of Wales' College, Moratuwa, University of Serampore, University of Kent, University of Ruhuna

Keerthisiri Fernando (Sinhala: කීර්තිසිරි ප්‍රනාන්දු හිමිපාණන්, born 5 May 1961) is the sixth bishop of Kurunegala, Sri Lanka.

== Early life and education ==
Wannakuwatte Mitiwaduge Devapriya Keerthisiri Fernando was born in Colombo on 5 May 1961, the son of David Fernando and Neeta Perera. Fernando attended the Prince of Wales' College, Moratuwa, from 1967 to 1980.

In 1989, Fernando received his Bachelor of Theology from the University of Serampore in India. He was subsequently ordained as a priest in the Church of Ceylon on 30 November 1990. In 1993 he obtained a Bachelor of Divinity from University of Serampore. From 1996 to 2010 he served in various positions at the Theological College of Lanka in Pilimatalawa. In 2001 he received a Master of Philosophy (Sociology with theological implications) from the University of Ruhuna in Sri Lanka and in 2005 he received a Master of Philosophy (Theology and Sociology of Religion) from the University of Kent.

== Ecclesiastical career ==
In 1996, he was posted to the Theological College of Lanka, Pilimatalawa as a lecturer. He served as Chaplain, Director of Field Education until 2010 and as acting principal. In 2011 he became the incumbent of the Holy Emmanuel Church, Moratuwa and in 2015 he was assigned to St. Francis of Assisi, Mount Lavinia. On 29 April 2016 he was installed as the 5th Archdeacon of Nuwara Eliya.

== Episcopal service ==
On 21 September 2017, he was elected to the position of Bishop of Kurunegala. On 6 January 2018 he was ordained as the 6th Bishop of Kurunegala at the Cathedral of Christ the King, Kurunegala.

In December 2020, the Archbishop of Canterbury appointed him as the Presiding Bishop of the Church of Ceylon.

On 17 May 2022, he received a Doctor of Divinity from St Andrew's Theological University in India.

== Resignation and later service ==
On 24 September 2022, he announced his resignation as bishop, citing personal reasons. The Archbishop of Canterbury appointed him as acting bishop until a replacement was made. Rt. Rev. Nishantha Fernando succeeded him as the 7th Bishop of the diocese after the election of the Bishop was held in Kurunegala on 17 December.

== Recent appointment ==
On 20 July 2024, Fernando was officially commissioned as the vicar of St Peter's Church, Murrumbeena within the Anglican Diocese of Melbourne of the Anglican Church of Australia by The Rt. Rev. Genieve Blackwell, Assistant Bishop of the Marmingatha Episcopate in the Anglican Diocese of Melbourne.

== Bibliography ==
- Fernando, Keerthisiri (2009). Integrity and Integration of Christian Community in Sri Lanka. S. Godage & Brothers. ISBN 9789552099649.
- Fernando, Keerthisiri (2009). Religion & Identity. S. Godage & Brothers. ISBN 9789552099656.
- Fernando, Keerthisiri (2021). Ethnicity, Religion & Identity. S. Godage & Brothers. ISBN 9786240008068.
- Fernando, Keerthisiri (2019). Ethno-Religious Identities. Theological College of Lanka, Pilimathalawa
- Fernando, Keerthisiri with Rasika Abeysinghe (2018). Christian Worship and Liturgy. Diocese of Kurunagala, Church of Ceylon

== See also ==
- Church of Ceylon
- Diocese of Kurunegala (Anglican)

Church of England titles
Preceded by Shantha Francis	Bishop of Kurunegala; 2017 – 2022	Succeeded by Nishantha Fernando
