= Walter Matthew =

Anglican archdeacon

Walter Edmund Matthew (26 February 1848 – 19 February 1889) was an Anglican archdeacon in India in the second half of the 19th century.

Matthew was born in Cambridge and educated at Merchant Taylor's and St John's College, Oxford where he matriculated in 1866, graduating BA in 1870 and MA in 1873. He was ordained deacon in 1871, and priest in 1872. After a curacy at Christ Church, Camden he was Archdeacon of Colombo and the incumbent at St Paul, Kandy from 1875. He died, in post, at Talawakelle.

Two of his sons also became clergymen: Herbert Edmund Matthew, who died at Keswick in 1944; and Leonard Arthur Matthew, who died at Sydney in 1964.
