= Hillwood College =

Hillwood College, Kandy

Location
- Kandy; Sri Lanka; 7°17′18″N 80°38′28″E

Information
- Type: Independent, day and boarding school
- Motto: The Utmost for the Highest
- Religious affiliation: Anglicanism
- Established: 1890; 136 years ago
- Founder: Elizabeth Bellerby
- Principal: Asha Vidanapathirana
- Chaplain: Sanath Madagamgoda
- Staff: 140+
- Grades: 1 - 13
- Gender: Girls
- Age: 6 to 18
- Enrollment: 2,000+
- Colours: Gold and Silver
- Affiliation: Anglican Church of Ceylon
- Website: www.hillwoodcollege.lk

Hillwood College is an independent, private girls' school in Kandy, Sri Lanka founded by British Anglican missionaries of the Church of England Zenana Missionary Society in 1890. The school is situated in the Kandy Lake round (Victoria Drive). The school is managed by the Church of Ceylon and falls under the Diocese of Kurunegala.

== Origin and history ==
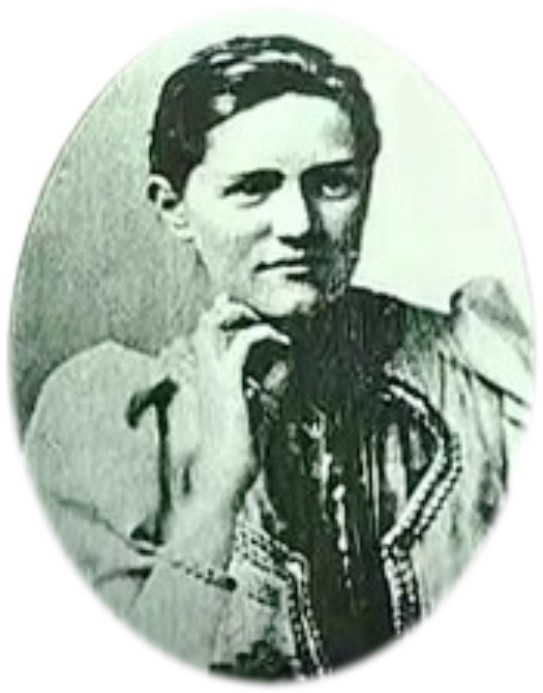
Miss Elizabeth Bellerby.

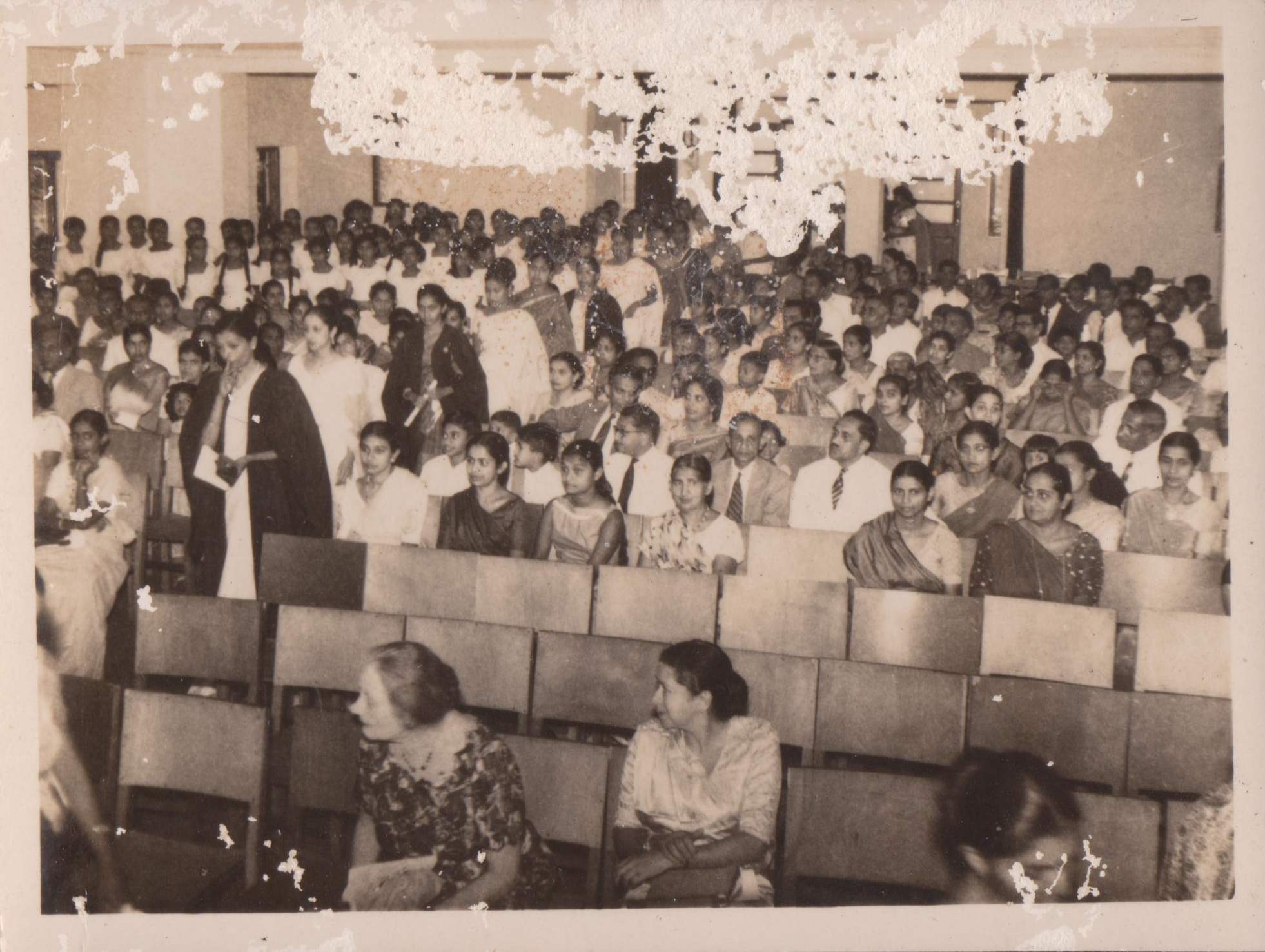
Hillwood College Auditorium in 1960s.

Hillwood College Kandy was founded in 1890 by Elizabeth Bellerby as a result of an appeal made by Rev. Ireland Jones and Rev. Garret to the Church of England Zenana Missionary Society (CEZMS) to open a school to benefit the Kandyan girls. Bellerby along with Ethel Jones arrived in Sri Lanka in 1889 to fulfil the request of the CEZMS. Upon arrival she went to the Christian Mission School, Kotte to learn Sinhalese which might have made it easier for her to converse with the local population. She made her way to Kandy, bought over Hillwood bungalow, and with seven students, set up the school on May 15, 1890.

In the beginning, there were only those seven pupils and at the time there was a prejudice common among people of "not educating girls", but she convinced the parents, saying that ”If you educate a son, you educate an individual but if you educate a daughter you educate an entire family”. With these remarks, the vision of the Kandyan people about educating girls changed vastly. After founding the college, Bellerby served as the founding principal for almost 21 years.

Lena Augusta Chapman served an apprenticeship as assistant to Bellerby for ten years until Bellerby returned to England in 1911. This training probably allowed her to understand the workings and particular challenges of the situation before she took on the responsibility of leading the school when she took over its reins in 1913. Chapman took her first controversial step with the school by admitting non-Kandyan day-scholars to Hillwood. Though aristocratic parents were not happy, the young principal stood her ground, and the change was gradually accepted.

The school continued to be primarily a boarding school based on the British Public school system for many years afterwards, Chapman continued to encourage the girls to push the boundaries of their lifestyle, introducing games and a tennis court to Hillwood. She was mindful of the Kandyan tradition which the school was pledged to protect though, and the girls played in their traditional ankle-length costumes, with their hair tied as a bun while their contemporaries played in shorter European dresses. This juxtaposition of the old and new, the modern and the traditional, the progressive and the conservative is even now an integral part of the school’s identity. By the time Hillwood celebrated its 25th anniversary in 1915, its students were award-winning tennis and netball players, and regular recipients of the Junior and Senior Cambridge certificates.

As the number of Christians grew it became hard to accompany the students to services at the nearby St. Paul's Church, Kandy, therefore there was a need of having a place of worship for the school. Lena Chapman raised funds for a chapel for the school. Building began in 1921, and by October 28, 1922, Hillwoodians had their own place of worship. As an Anglican missionary school, Christian worship at the chapel plays a central role in school life.

Nowadays the school is acting as a facilitator for more than 2,000 girls.

== Principals ==
Name	Year
Elizabeth Bellerby	1889-1911
Lena Chapman	1911-1931
Mary Dorothy Rigg	1911-1944
Elenor M. Foss	1944-1946
Somakumari Samarasinghe	1947-1964
Barbara De Alwis	1964-1977
Nimalathevi Perera	1977-1990
Sumithra R. Rathnayake	1990-2005
Sudarshini Kumari Hettige	2008-2016
Nelum De Alwis	2016-2024
Asha Vidanapathirana	2024–Present

== Notable alumni ==
Name	Notability	Reference
Chandra Ranaraja	first female Mayor of Kandy (1990–1991)	
Thalatha Gunasekara	actress	
Duleeka Marapana	actress	
Sachini Ayendra Stanley	Miss Sri Lanka 2003	
