= Ecumenical Institute for Study and Dialogue =

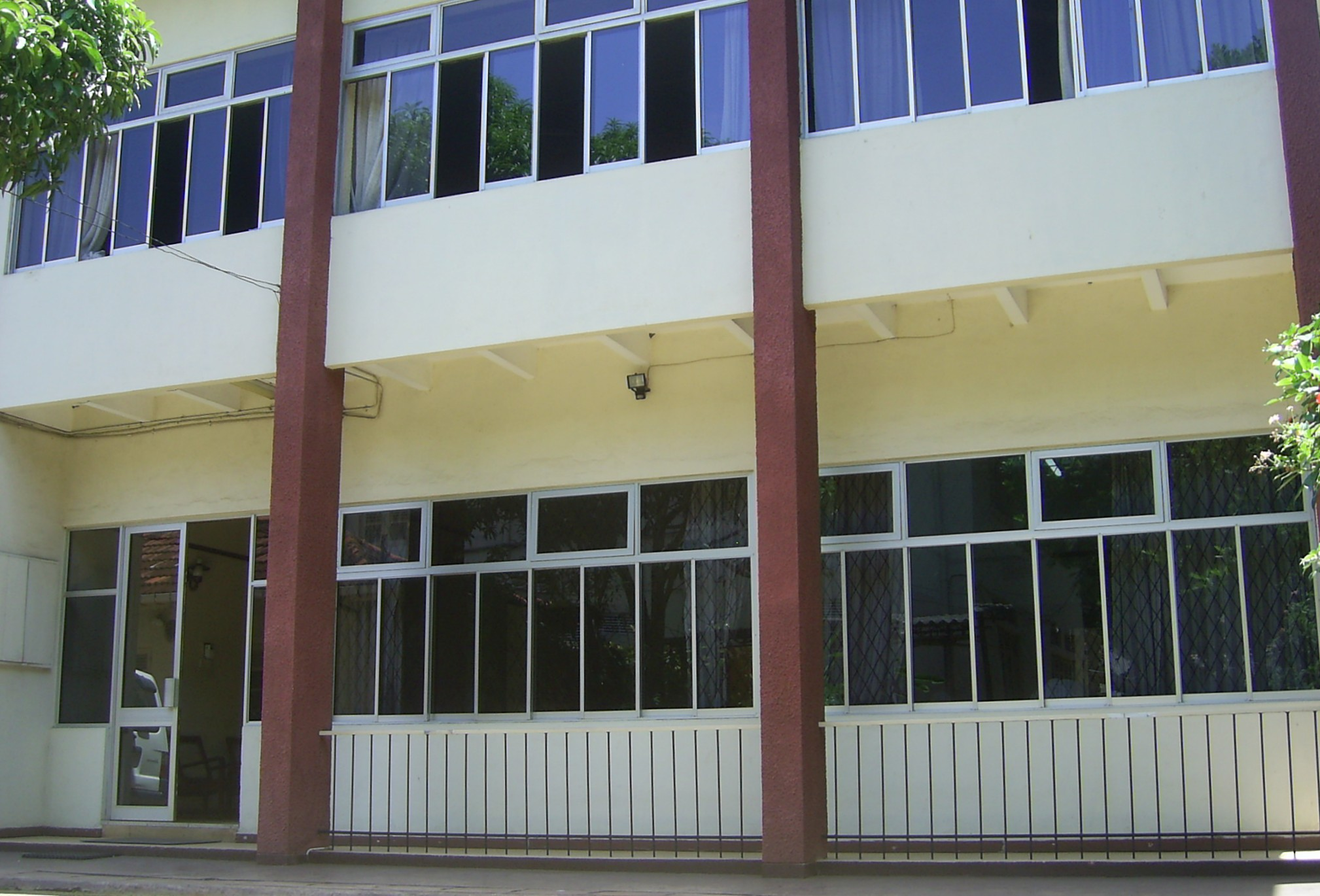
The Ecumenical Institute for Study and Dialogue building

The Ecumenical Institute for Study and Dialogue (EISD), formerly called Study Center for Religion and Society, is an institute located in Colombo, Sri Lanka that is devoted to the study and interpretation of religious and social movements of people in Sri Lanka, in order to assist the Church in fulfilling its duty to be a witness and service to the life of the nation. The center has been involved in successfully organising a number of dialogues, meetings and seminars, and it has become an internationally recognised center for study and dialogue with Buddhism, along with other ecumenical concerns. The center was recognised in the 1970s and 1980s as one of the most active of all similar study centers worldwide.

The Study Center was established in 1951, due to the resurgence of Buddhism after independence, which brought with it an increased need for dialogue between Buddhism and Christianity. The goal of the center is to consider Christianity in the light of the Sri Lankan culture and heritage, which is predominantly Buddhist. The Study Center was renamed in 1977 to Ecumenical Institute for Study and Dialogue (EISD).

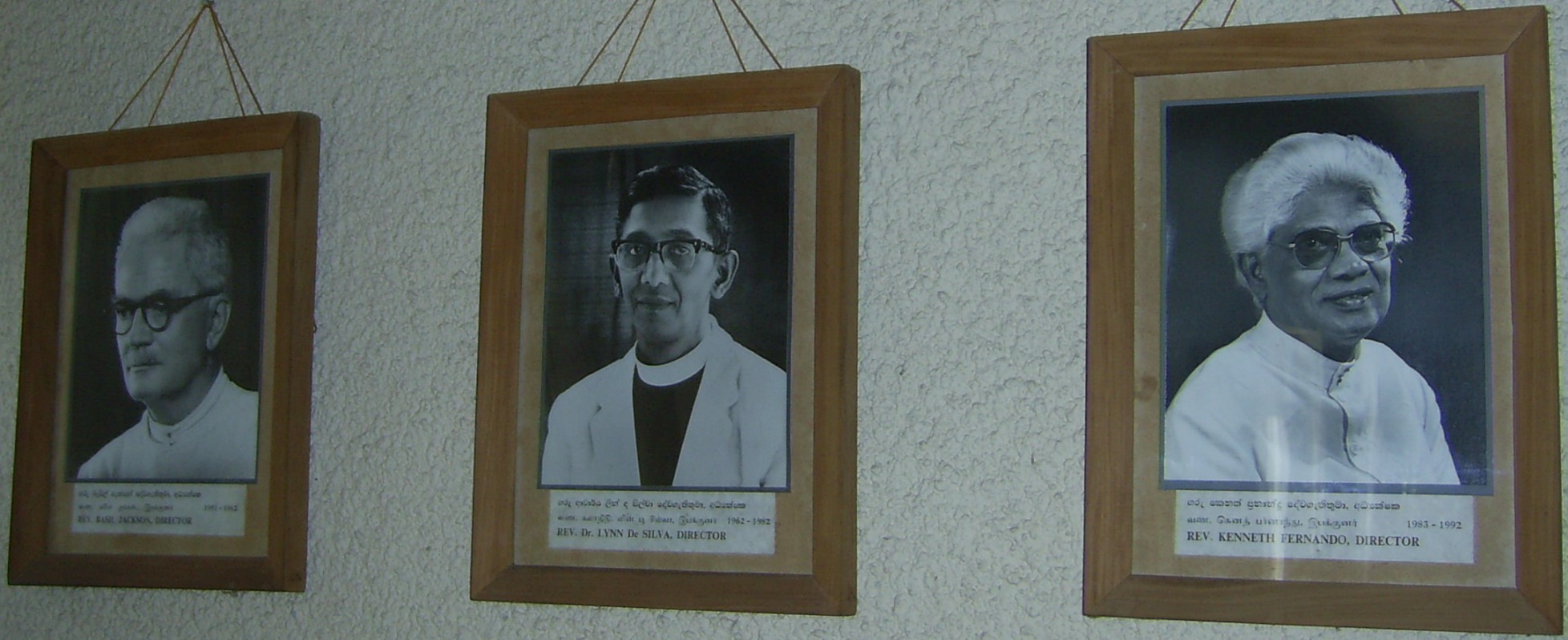
The first three directors of the EISD: Rev. G. B. Jackson, Rev. Dr. Lynn A. de Silva, and Rev. Kenneth Fernando

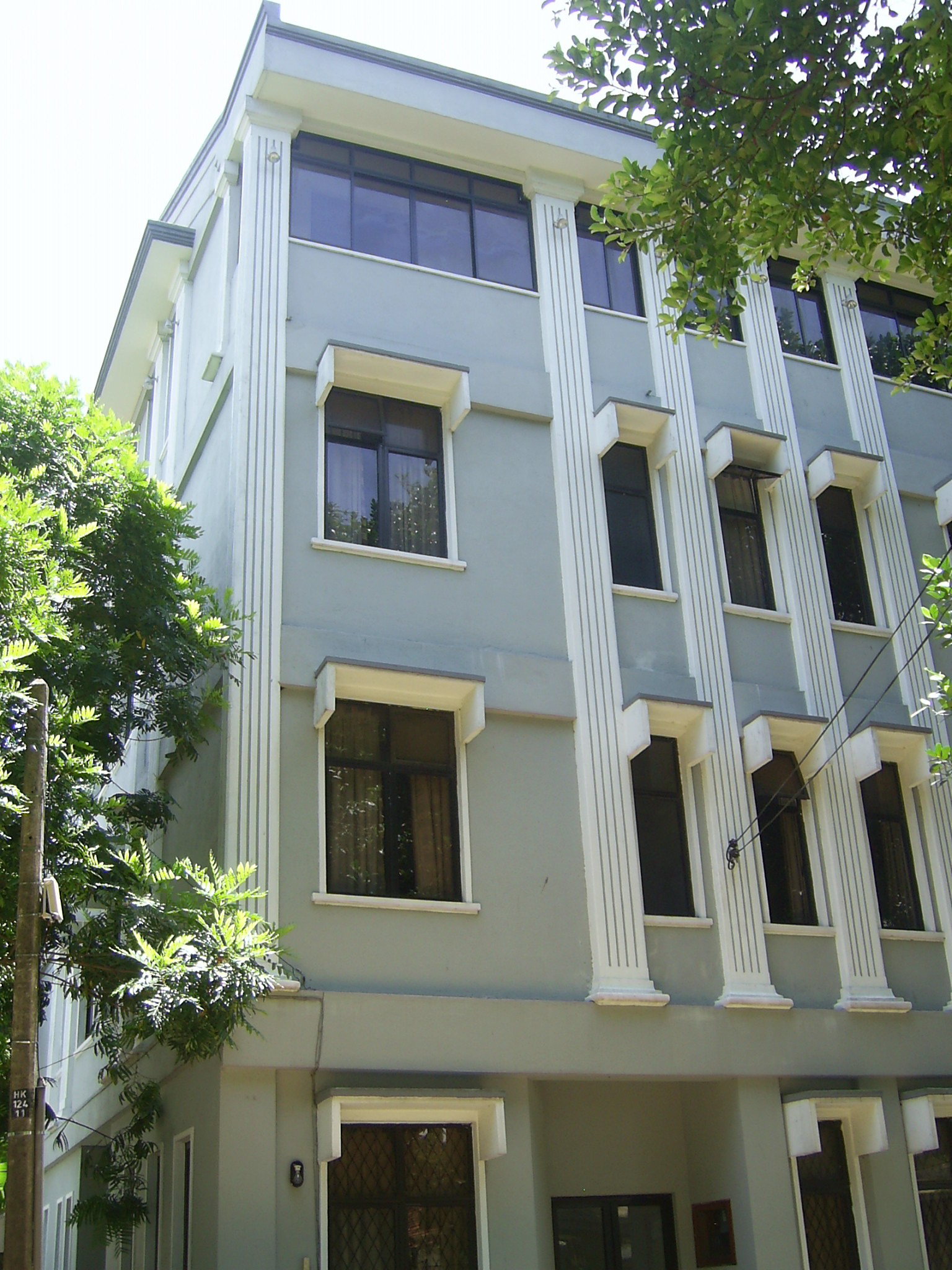
New building to accommodate visitors to the EISD

After its establishment in 1951, the center was managed by Rev. G. B. Jackson. It was organised into two divisions: Division of Buddhist Studies, and Division of Frontier Studies. The purpose of the former division is to promote study and research in Buddhism, while the purpose of the latter division is to explore the theological and social implications of the Christian faith in Sri Lanka. From 1962 until 1982, the center was directed by Lynn de Silva, whose focus was on Buddhist studies. Under his leadership, the EISD was set up in 1977 as an autonomous body separate from the control of religious bodies and institutions. Although the primary focus was maintained on Buddhist-Christian studies and dialogue, a third additional division called Division of Studies of other Faiths and Ideologies was opened in order to initiate studies in other religions.

In addition to publishing books and papers on dialogue between Christianity and other religions, the EISD publishes the Dialogue journal on a quarterly basis, which is one of the first theological journals on Buddhist-Christian encounter. The journal was founded by Lynn de Silva in order to move the prevailing atmosphere between Buddhists and Christians in Sri Lanka away from diatribe and towards dialogue. This journal has published articles on a wide range of topics including "the existence of God, the idea of the soul, working towards shared ethical practice, monastic life, globalisation and women in religion."

After Lynn de Silva's death in 1982, the EISD was directed by Rev. Kenneth Fernando, and it is currently directed by Marshal Fernando. Rev. Fr. Aloysius Pieris, S. J., who had been collaborating with de Silva since 1968, and who in partnership with de Silva had officially been responsible for editing the New Series of Dialogue, continued to work as editor of the journal after de Silva's death. Mrs. Langanee Mendis, the Administrative Secretary at the institute, is credited as being the main person responsible for the uninterrupted functioning of the institute after Lynn de Silva's death; she was also considered by Pieris in 2003 to be "a tower of strength [for the Ecumenical Institute] for well over 20 years."
