= Christianity in Sri Lanka =

Christians in Sri Lanka
- 6th century, known as the Anuradhapura cross plays a significant role in Christians in Sri Lanka.

- Christians by region (1980–2000)

Total population
- 1,552,161 (2012)

Founder
- Thomas the Apostle

Regions with significant populations
- Province
- Western: ▲752,993
- North Western: ▲300,367
- Northern: ▲204,005
- Central: ▼90,519
- Eastern: ▼80,801

Religions
- Roman Catholicism; Anglicanism; Pentecostalism; Methodism

Languages
- Sinhala; Tamil; English

Christianity is a minority religion in Sri Lanka. It was introduced to the island in the first century. Traditionally, after Thomas the Apostle's visit in Kerala in AD 52, Christianity is said to have been introduced to Sri Lanka because of its close geographical and commercial ties.

Records suggest that St. Thomas Christians and East Syriac Christians lived in Sri Lanka, and the Anuradhapura cross is one of the archaeological finds that suggest Christianity in Sri Lanka before the arrival of the Portuguese.

Nestorian Christianity is said to have thrived in Sri Lanka with the patronage of King Dhatusena during the 5th century. There are mentions of involvement of Persian Christians with the Sri Lankan royal family during the Sigiriya Period. Over seventy-five ships carrying Murundi soldiers from Mangalore are said to have arrived in the Sri Lankan town of Chilaw most of whom were Christians. King Dhatusena's daughter was married to his nephew Migara who is also said to have been a Nestorian Christian, and a commander of the Sinhalese army. Maga Brahmana, a Christian priest of Persian origin is said to have provided advice to King Dathusena on establishing his palace on the Sigiriya Rock. According to Leonard Pinto, this is not widely accepted as it is contrary to recorded Mahāvaṃsa textual sources on royal family from this period.

In 1557, King Dharmapala converted to Christianity, and king's conversion did not make any significant impact in Christianity. The Anuradhapura Cross discovered in 1912 is also considered to be an indication of a strong Nestorian Christian presence in Sri Lanka between the 3rd and 10th century in the then capital of Anuradhapura of Sri Lanka. There were also conversions by the Dutch in the 17th century.

The Christian population of Sri Lanka includes members of Burghers, Sinhalese and Tamil ethnic groups.

Christianity in Sri Lanka 1881–2012
Year	Population	%
1881 census	268,000	9.71%
1891 census	302,100	10.04%
1901 census	349,200	9.79%
1911 census	409,200	9.96%
1921 census	443,400	9.85%
1931 census	518,100	9.76%
1946 estimation	603,200	9.06%
1953 census	724,400	8.94%
1963 census	884,900	8.36%
1971 census	1,004,300	7.91%
1981 census	1,130,600	7.61%
2001 census	1,185,900	7.00%
2012 census	1,509,600	7.44%
2025 census	1,506,533	6.90%

Christianity represented 10% of the population of Sri Lanka in 1891. In the following decades, the population growth of Christians was lower than the national average. As a result, the percentage of Christians in the population declined, reaching a low of 7% in 2001.

In 2012, Christianity grew again as a percentage of the population, reaching 7.44%. The growth was greatest among non-Catholic Christians.

== Catholicism ==
In the pre-colonial era, Nestorian Christians and St. Thomas Christians were both present in Sri Lanka. These two groups later established a union with the Catholic Church. After Yahballaha III, the Nestorians accepted union with the Catholic Church. Father Jordanus arrived in Sri Lanka in 1329 and Giovanni de Marignolli arrived as Papal Legate in 1348/49 to assist the Christians in the country. There were also Catholic travellers, such as Odoric of Pordenone, who visited Sri Lanka.

Catholicism was formally introduced by the Portuguese in 1505. 6.19% of the population (1,261,194 persons) is Catholic, according to the 2012 census. Catholicism thus constitutes approximately 83.5% of the Christian population as of census day 2012.

Catholicism was first introduced by the Portuguese, who left a notable mark in that Portuguese surnames are still used by many Catholics. Dutch missionaries tried to spread Protestantism after the Portuguese were expelled, but most Sri Lankan Christians are now Catholics. There is an archbishop and 11 other bishops.

== Protestantism ==
290,967 persons in Sri Lanka (1.43%) are Protestants as per the 2012 census. The Ceylon Pentecostal Mission has about 16,500 church members and 70 churches (faith homes) in Sri Lanka. About 2000 people (1998) are affiliated with congregations belonging to the Baptist World Alliance.

The main Protestant churches in Sri Lanka are Anglican, Methodist, Baptist and Salvation Army. The Church of Ceylon is an extra-provincial Anglican church, and the Church of South India (a united church of Anglicans, Presbyterians, and other Protestants) is a full member of the Anglican Communion and has a diocese in Jaffna. The Anglican Church has a strong effect on people in some areas. Methodist missionaries established 187 schools of which only 2 remains (Wesley College and Methodist College) because all the other schools were taken over by the government. Methodism has over 40,000 followers in Sri Lanka with 45 circuits, 200 churches and 120 pastors. Moratuwa Area and Kutunayake Negombo Areas are the regions where many Methodists live. In 2005 and 2006, the Methodist Church of Sri Lanka had a very difficult time during a period of anti-Christian violence.

St. Andrew's Church in Colombo is a congregation of the Church of Scotland. For administrative purposes, it is part of the Church of Scotland's International Presbytery.

According to the 2015 yearbook of Jehovah's Witnesses, around 6,671 active members are in Sri Lanka.

=== American Mission ===
Ceylon under the British relied heavily on Christian missionaries to carry out educational actives. A significant portion of this effort was made by the American Ceylon Mission (ACM) that was established in 1813 by Rev. Samuel Newell in Jaffna, in Tamil-dominated northern Ceylon, as part of the evangelising effort of the American Board of Commissioners for Foreign Missions.

=== Lutheranism ===
The Ceylon Evangelical Lutheran Church is a confessional Lutheran church in Sri Lanka, and the only Lutheran denomination registered with the Sri Lankan government. The church consists of more than a dozen congregations or mission stations, mainly concentrated in the tea plantation regions of Nuwara Eliya, Central Province.

== Eastern Orthodoxy ==
The Russian Orthodox Church organised two missionary trips to Sri Lanka in January and April 2024, resuming its mission on the island after earlier attempts had failed to take root. Liturgical services were held in the city of Kurunegala and the neighboring village of Melsiripura. Following constituent meetings of communities in Kurunegala and Colombo, members are awaiting the decision of clergy on the official establishment of the parishes of the Russian Orthodox Church in Sri Lanka.

== See also ==
- Religion in Sri Lanka
- Status of religious freedom in Sri Lanka
- 2019 Sri Lanka Easter bombings
- Mannar Catholic martyrs (1544)
