= Anuradhapura cross =

Native cross symbol used by Sri Lankan Christians

A portrait illustration of the Anuradhapura cross or The Cross of Anuradhapura

The Anuradhapura cross (Sinhala: අනුරාධපුර කුරුසිය Anuradhapura Kurusiya) is a form of the Christian cross symbol. It is the most ancient symbol of Christianity in Sri Lanka.

== The cross ==
The cross was discovered in 1912 during archaeological excavations in Anuradhapura. It is cut in sunk relief on the side of a smooth granite column of which a fragment was excavated. An immediate determination about the cross came from the Archaeological Commissioner of Ceylon, Edward R. Ayrton, who concluded that it was a Portuguese cross. In 1924, Ayrton's successor, Arthur Maurice Hocart, put more effort to clarify the cross and he described it in his publication, Memoirs of the Archaeological Survey of Ceylon, as being "a cross of a floret type standing on a stepped pedestal from which emanates two fronds on each side of the cross like horns". Hocart also concluded it was a Portuguese cross. Both men considered that it was a Nestorian cross or "Persian Cross" from the Portuguese era. A number of historical records also suggest that Assyrian Church of the East may have been in Sri Lanka between the middle fifth and sixth centuries. There, it is believed that the cross was dated to the Anuradhapura period. Meanwhile, whilst it was considered as a Portuguese cross these claims are questionable given various historic facts, notably that the Portuguese did not have a presence in Anuradhapura at the time.

The most conclusive determination of the cross's origins was made in 1926 by Humphrey Codrington, based on evidence contained in a 6th-century manuscript, Christian Topography, that a community of Persian Christians were known to reside in Taprobanê (the Ancient Greek name for Sri Lanka). Codrington wrote in his book, A Short History of Ceylon, that "about A.D. 500 we read of a Persian colony; a Nestorian cross undoubtedly belonging to this community is to be seen in the Anuradhapura museum". In 1954 the then assistant Archaeological Commissioner, Titus Devendra, dismissed the historical reliability of the Christian Topography and attributed the cross to the Portuguese dating it later than 1547. Academics however have since concluded that the Christian Topography is historically accurate. In 1984 an archaeological find at Manthai confirmed the existence of Persian Christians in Sri Lanka, including a seal with a Nestorian cross, with similar stylistic features to the Anuradhapura cross.

== Symbology ==
The cross is considered as a variation of the St Thomas Cross (Note: St. Thomas Cross is considered as a Nestorian cross or a version of Nestorian cross) due to its similar shape and possible links between the early Christian community in South India and Sri Lanka. The Anuradhapura cross however has unique features when compared to other crosses. The three main elements that the Anuradhapura cross has in common with Nestorian crosses are: the "leaves" (with their upward facing fronds) at the base of the cross, which symbolize the "tree of life" (the vitality of the tree is accentuated by its fruit-like protrusions); the second element is that each of the arms of the cross terminate in a pearl. Pearls played a central theme in Syriac devotional literature and iconography. The third element is the base, which is a three-stepped pedestal. The three tiers symbolise the three levels of paradise, the three decks of the ark, and the three limits of ascent to Sinai.

== Popular use ==
The Anuradhapura cross was featured in the official logo of Pope Francis' 2015 visit to Sri Lanka. The Roman Catholic Archdiocese of Colombo referred to the cross in this capacity as the Glorious Cross or the Cross of the Resurrection.

The cross is also depicted on the coat of arms of the Diocese of Kurunegala of the Church of Ceylon.

== Similar crosses ==
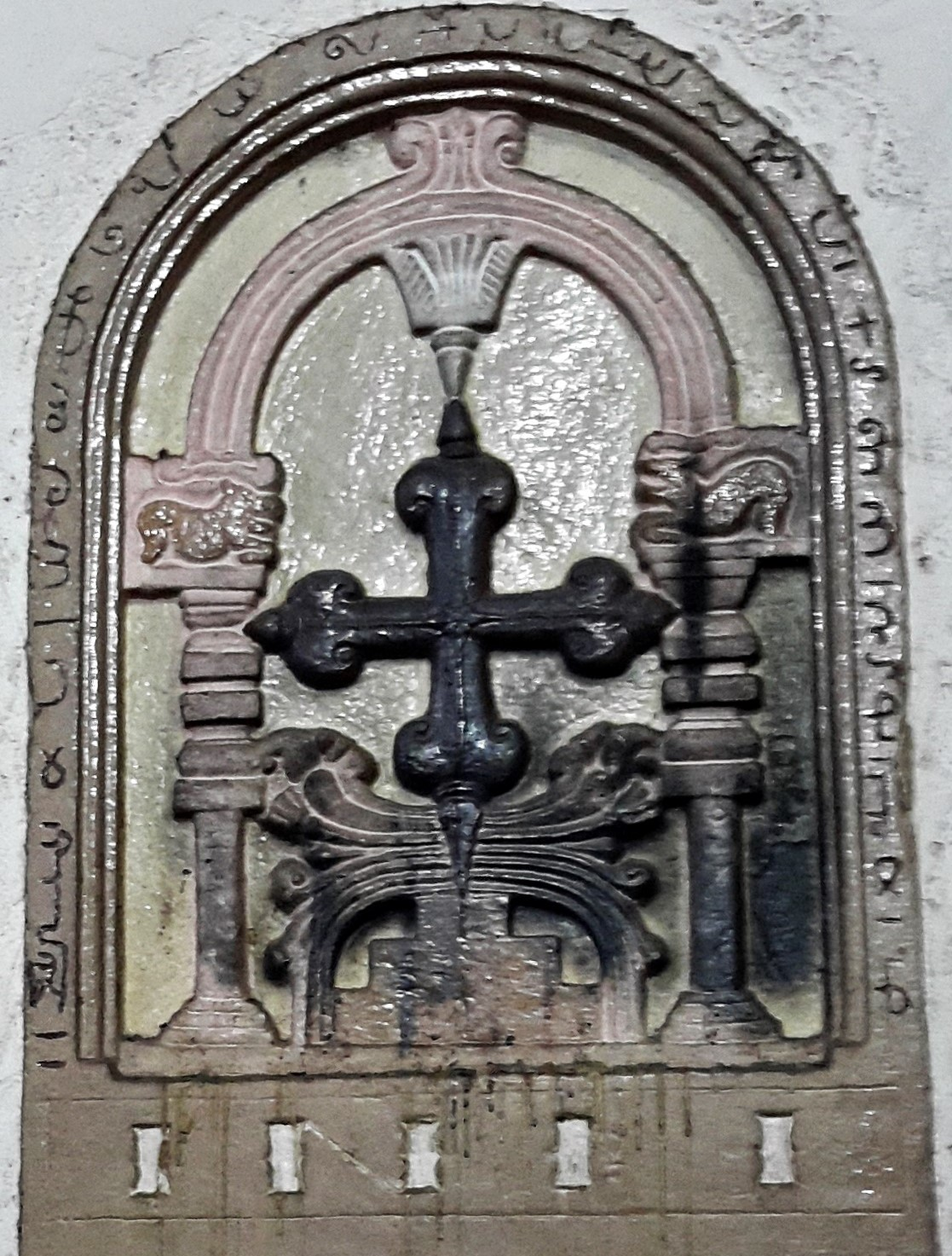
Persian cross/St. Thomas Christian cross (Kerala, India)

Syrian/Jacobite cross (illustration)

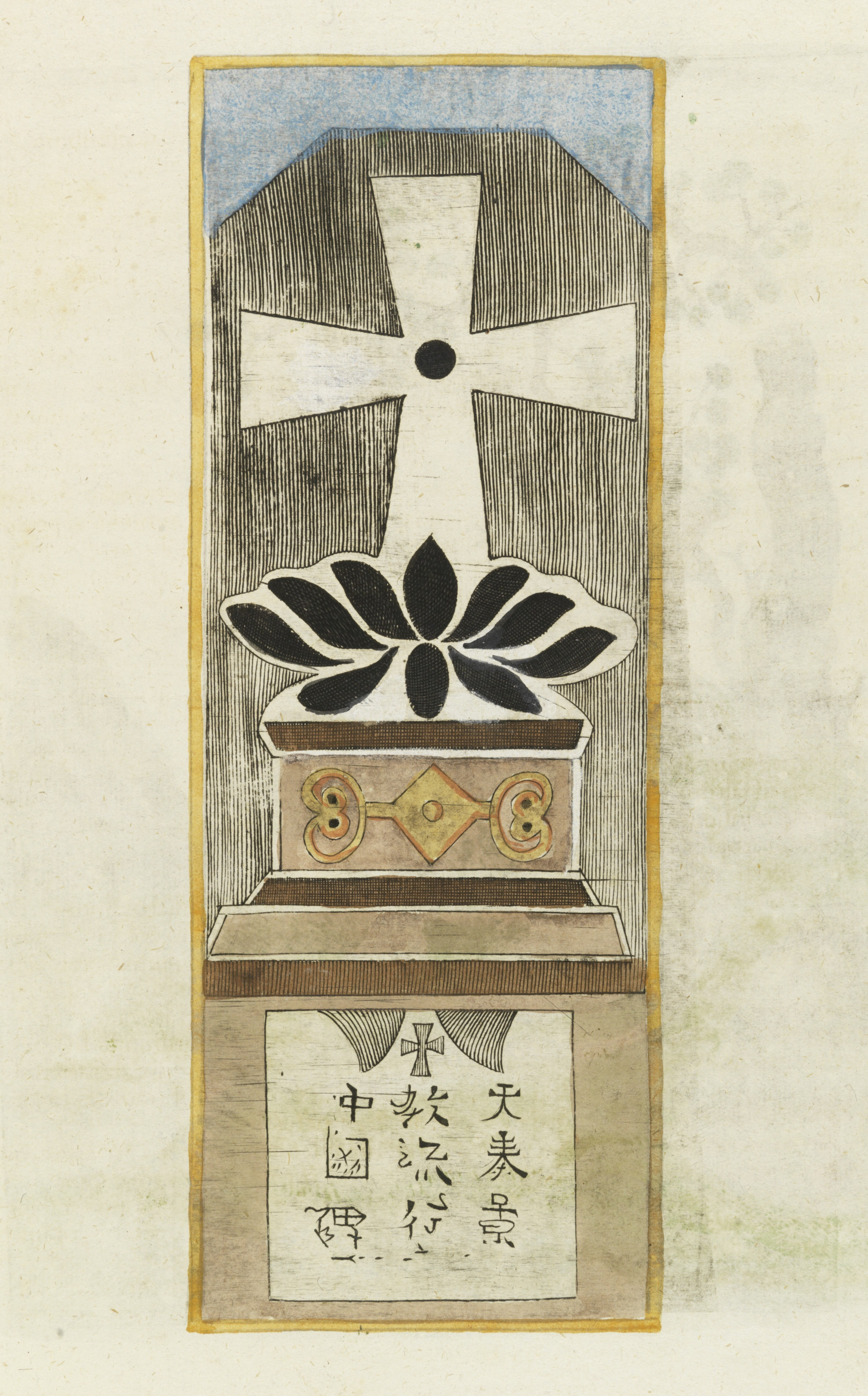
Nestorian cross (China), with flora at the bottom

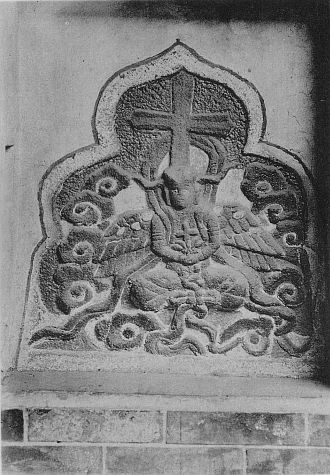
Nestorian cross (China), on a headstone

Portuguese cross (Order of Aviz, founded in 1146)

Portuguese cross (Order of Christ, founded in 1319)
