= Lakdasa De Mel =

Sri Lankan Anglican bishop and metropolitan (1902-1976)

Right Reverend Lakdasa Jacob De Mel
- Anglican Bishop of Calcutta; Anglican Bishop of Kurunegala
- Church: Church of India, Pakistan, Burma and Ceylon; Anglican Church of Ceylon
- Diocese: Calcutta; Kurunegala
- In office: 1962–1970; 1950–1962
- Successor: Lakshman Wickremasinghe
- Previous post: Assistant Bishop of Colombo

Orders
- Ordination: 1927
- Consecration: 2 February 1950 by George Hubback

Personal details
- Born: 24 March 1902 Moratuwa, Sri Lanka
- Died: 23 October 1976 (aged 74) Kurunegala, Sri Lanka

Most Rev. Lakdasa Jacob De Mel (1902–1976), MA was the first Bishop of Kurunegala, Sri Lanka and the last Metropolitan Archbishop of India, Pakistan, Burma and Ceylon.

Lakdasa De Mel was born on 24 March 1902 in Moratuwa, Sri Lanka, to a prominent Anglican family. He was the son of Sir Henry de Mel, former Member of the Legislative Council and Elsie Jayawickrame. De Mel was educated at the Royal College Colombo and went on to study at Keble College at the University of Oxford, gaining an MA. De Mel was ordained to a short curacy at St John the Divine, Kennington before returning to Sri Lanka, where he was appointed as the parish priest at St Michael and All Angels Church, Polwatte. For 10 years he was the authority of Missionary of South Sri Lanka’s Baddegama Parish. From 1940 he served as the priest at St. Paul's Church, Kandy. As a priest he became one of the pioneers of the indigenisation of the Anglican Church in Sri Lanka. He said his first Mass in Sinhala and sought to integrate local music styles into the service.

De Mel was consecrated as Assistant Bishop of Colombo on 8 November 1945.

In January 1950 the Church of Ceylon resolved to create a new diocese, the Diocese of Kurunegala. The diocese was formally inaugurated on 2 February 1950, on the Feast of the Presentation, with George Hubback, the then Metropolitan of India, Pakistan, Burma and Ceylon, appointing De Mel as the first Bishop of Kurunegala. The formation of this new Diocese was marked by the induction, installation and enthronement of De Mel as the founding Bishop, at Trinity College Chapel, Kandy. He, along with other members of the De Mel family were largely responsible for the funding of the construction of the Cathedral of Christ the King.

In May 1962, De Mel was elected as Metropolitan of India, Pakistan, Burma and Ceylon and Bishop of Calcutta, the first Sri Lankan to become an Archbishop of the Anglican Church. He was enthroned on 21 August 1962, at St. Paul's Cathedral, Calcutta. It was a post that he held until his retirement in 1970.

In 1971 he married Joan Hamilton (1921–2009) and at the end of 1972 they moved to live in Kurunegala.

In March 1976 he was diagnosed with lung cancer and he died on 23 October 1976, his ashes were interred in the Cathedral of Christ the King.

== See also ==
- Church of Ceylon
- Bishop of Kurunegala
- Bishop of Calcutta
- Theological College of Lanka

Church of England titles
Preceded by -	Bishop of Kurunegala; 1950 – 1962	Succeeded by Lakshman Wickremasinghe
Preceded by Aurobindo Nath Mukherjee	Bishop of Calcutta; 1962 – 1970	Succeeded by Joseph Amritanand
