= Cathedral of Christ the King, Kurunegala =

Cathedral of Christ the King
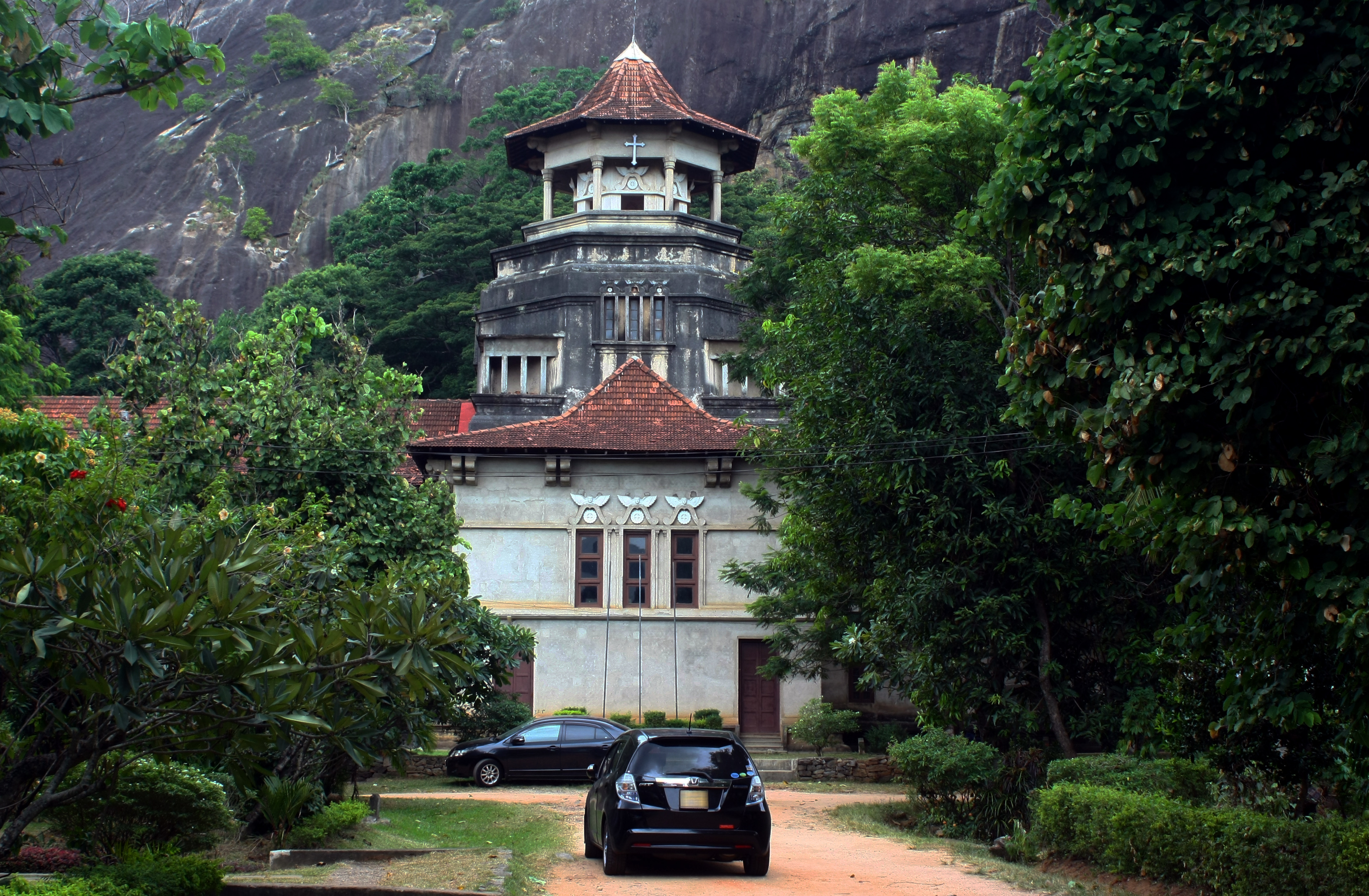

Religion
- Affiliation: Anglican, Church of Ceylon
- Year consecrated: 1956
- Status: Active

Location
- Location: Kurunegala, Sri Lanka
- Interactive map of Cathedral of Christ the King
- Coordinates: 7°29′11.0″N 80°22′04.0″E

Architecture
- Architect: Wilson Peiris
- Type: Church
- Groundbreaking: 1950
- Completed: 1960
- Construction cost: Rs 500,000

Cathedral of Christ the King is located on Kandy Road, Kurunegala, Sri Lanka. It is the primary Anglican cathedral of the Diocese of Kurunegala, affiliated to the Church of Ceylon.

The construction of the church (estimated at a cost of Rs 500,000) was largely funded by Most Rev. Lakdasa De Mel, the first Bishop of Kurunegala, along with other members of the De Mel family. The construction of the church commenced on 21 December 1950 (the feast of St. Thomas), upon a 1.4 hectares (3.5 acres) site, at the base of Ethagala (Elephant Rock). The chapel of the Blessed Virgin and St. Thomas the Apostle were consecrated in 1956, the ceremony was presided over by Rev. Aurobindo Nath Mukherjee, Metropolitan of India, Pakistan, Burma and Ceylon. The nave, the font, the pulpit and the lectern were consecrated in 1960. The architecture, especially the nave and roof is a combination of Polonnaruwa and Kandy era architecture, reflecting the brick vaulted image houses (Polonnaruwa) and the Temple of the Sacred Tooth Relic (Kandy). The cathedral is constructed out of cement and reinforced concrete. The central tower is 33 metres (108 ft) high and crowned by a bronze cross. The brass lamps and the communion rails depict art motifs and lacquer work of Kandyan tradition. The 'Cross of Anuradhapura' is also replicated in brass. The flags of the ‘Disavas’ (the traditional districts), which constituted the Diocese of Kurunegala, have been reproduced by Ena de Silva and are displayed on an interior wall of the cathedral. The modern painting, by Nalini Marcia Jayasuriya, forms the backdrop to the Lady Chapel and the fresco of Christ the King was painted by George Keyt.
