= Lakshman Wickremasinghe =

Sri Lankan bishop and human rights activist (1923-87)

The Right Reverend Lakshman Wickremesinghe
- Anglican Bishop of Kurunegala
- Church: Anglican Church of Ceylon
- Diocese: Kurunegala
- In office: 1962 – 1983
- Predecessor: Lakdasa De Mel
- Successor: Andrew Kumarage

Orders
- Ordination: 1952
- Consecration: 1962 by Lakdasa De Mel

Personal details
- Born: 25 March 1927
- Died: 23 October 1983 (aged 56) Colombo, Sri Lanka

Lakshman Wickremesinghe (25 March 1927 – 23 October 1983) was one of the youngest bishops in the Anglican Communion and a human rights activist.

== Early life and education ==
Born on 25 March 1927, he was the third son of Cyril Wickremesinghe of the Ceylon Civil Service and Esme Moonamalle Goonewardene of Moonamalle Walawwa Kurunegala. One of his brothers was the press baron, Esmond Wickramasinghe. One of his nephews was Ranil Wickremesinghe who would later become the President of Sri Lanka.

Educated at Royal College, Colombo and S Thomas' Gurutalawa, he achieved the best First in political science from the University of Ceylon, then went to Keble College, Oxford but did not finish his Master's. He then went to theological college at Ely. Following his ordination in 1952 he worked at All Saints Church, Poplar, in the East End of London.

== Career ==
In 1958 he returned to Sri Lanka, where he undertook parish work in Mutwal for a few years before he became the Chaplain at Peradeniya University. Wickremasinghe was consecrated as Bishop of Kurunegala in the Church of Ceylon at the end of 1962, when he was just 35, the youngest in the Anglican Communion. He was the successor to Lakdasa De Mel who had become Anglican Metropolitan of all four former British colonies, India, Burma, Pakistan (then including East Pakistan, the future Bangladesh), and Ceylon.

== Human rights ==
He was much involved in human rights activities from 1971 onwards, and became Chairman of the Civil Rights Movement, protesting against the authoritarianism of J.R. Jayawardene's government and in particular its attacks on Tamils. He suffered a heart attack in 1981 and was advised to take things slow and had a year in England, where he was in July 1983 when Black July took place. He returned to Sri Lanka, and was one of the first leaders to go up to Jaffna, but all this caused another heart attack and he died in October that year.

The character of Harry in Rajiva Wijesinha's 1985 novel Acts of Faith is based on him.

Church of England titles
Preceded by Lakdasa De Mel	Bishop of Kurunegala; 1962 – 1983	Succeeded by Andrew Kumarage
