= St Andrew's Girls College, Nawalapitiya =

St. Andrew's Girls' College, Nawalapitiya ශාන්ත අන්දෲගේ බාලිකා මහා විදුහල பரி அந்தரேயர் மகளிர் கல்லூரி

Location
- Nawalapitiya; Sri Lanka
- Coordinates: 7.0569°N 80.5357°E

Information
- School type: Provincial school
- Established: 1850
- Gender: Girls

St. Andrew's Girls' College (Sinhala: ශාන්ත අන්දෲගේ බාලිකා මහා විදුහල, Tamil: செயிண்ட் ஆண்ட்ரூ'ஸ் கேர்ல்ஸ் 'கல்லூரி) is a school in Central Province, Sri Lanka. It is situated in the Kandy District The school is located near Mahaweli Ganga, close to the Nawalapitiya Police station and in front of the Nawalapitiya railway station. It was the first school that was started in Nawalapitiya as a mixed school. It currently operates as a girls only school.
