= Kurana, Sri Lanka =

Municipal ward in Negombo, Sri Lanka

Kurana is a municipal ward of Negombo, Sri Lanka. It is on the Negombo-Colombo Main road and is located a few miles from the Bandaranaike International Airport. It has an average elevation of 7 m (23 ft) above sea level.
