= Lakshmi de Silva =

Lakshmi de Silva is a translator, writer and critic from Sri Lanka. In 2000, her work was shortlisted for the Gratiaen Prize. She has also received the Sahithyarathna Award for lifetime achievement.

== Biography ==
De Silva has been a lecturer in English at the University of Kelaniya. In 2000, her translation of Henry Jayasena’s play Kuveni was shortlisted for the Gratiaen Prize.

== Publications ==
- De, S. L. (2004). 12 centuries of Sinhala poetry: A Sri Lankan anthology. Colombo, Sri Lanka: Vijitha Yapa Publications.
