= Aloysius Pieris =

Sri Lankan Jesuit theologian (1934–2026)

Aloysius Pieris SJ (9 April 1934 – 22 March 2026) was a Sri Lankan Jesuit priest, theologian, intellectual, Buddhist scholar and the founding director of the Tulana Research Centre for Encounter and Dialogue.

== Biography ==
Aloysius Pieris was born in Ampitiya, British Ceylon (present-day Sri Lanka). He studied at St. Aloysius' College, Galle. He took his Jesuit vows in 1953. Pieris had three theological degrees, an LPh from Sacred Heart College in Shembaganur, India (1959), an STL from the Pontifical Theological Faculty in Naples (1966), and a Th.D. from Tilburg University (1987). Pieris also had a BA in Pali and Sanskrit from the University of London (1961) graduating with first-class honours and reportedly becoming the first student in the world to do so and a Ph.D. in Buddhist philosophy from the University of Sri Lanka (1971). He also obtained a diploma in Pre-Polyphonic Music from Fondazione Cini, Venice, in 1964. He held academic posts as the Franciscan Chair in Mission Studies at the Washington Theological Union, the Henry Luce Chair of World Christianity at Union Theological Seminary, New York, and the A. P. Wilson Distinguished Visiting Chair of Theology at Vanderbilt Divinity School.

He was fluent in more than twenty languages, including Pali, Sanskrit, several forms of Prakrit, Sinhala, English, Greek, German, Spanish, Italian, French, Latin, Aramaic and Hebrew.

In June 1974, Pieris established the Tulana Research Centre for Encounter and Dialogue in Kelaniya, Sri Lanka, and was its director ever afterwards. Tulana was created as a Jesuit retreat site, but also as a space for Buddhist-Christian interfaith dialogue.

One of Pieris's most well-known writings, An Asian Theology of Liberation (1988), attempts to move beyond the limitations of Latin American liberation theology and engage with an Asia that is wreaked by severe poverty and shaped by deep religiosity.

Pieris died on 22 March 2026, at the age of 91.

== Honors ==
A festschrift was prepared in his honour on the occasion of his seventieth birthday, entitled Encounters with the Word (2004).

In November 2015, Pieris was awarded an honorary DLitt in recognition of his lifetime contribution to the field of humanities by the University of Kelaniya.

In January 2019, Pieris was awarded the International Harmony Theologian Prize by the Institute of International Harmony and Sustainable Development, Bishop Dennis Ng Victory Ministries Foundation at the International Harmony Conference on 7 January 2019.

== Works ==
- Pieris, Aloysius (1988). Asian Theology of Liberation. London: T&T Clark. ISBN 9780567640277.
- Pieris, Aloysius (1988). Love meets wisdom: a Christian experience of Buddhism. Maryknoll, NY: Orbis Books. ISBN 9780883443729.
- Pieris, Aloysius (1996). Fire and Water: Basic Issues in Asian Buddhism and Christianity. Maryknoll, NY: Orbis Books. ISBN 9781570750557.
