= St. Paul's Church, Kandy =

Anglican church in Sri Lanka

St. Paul's Church
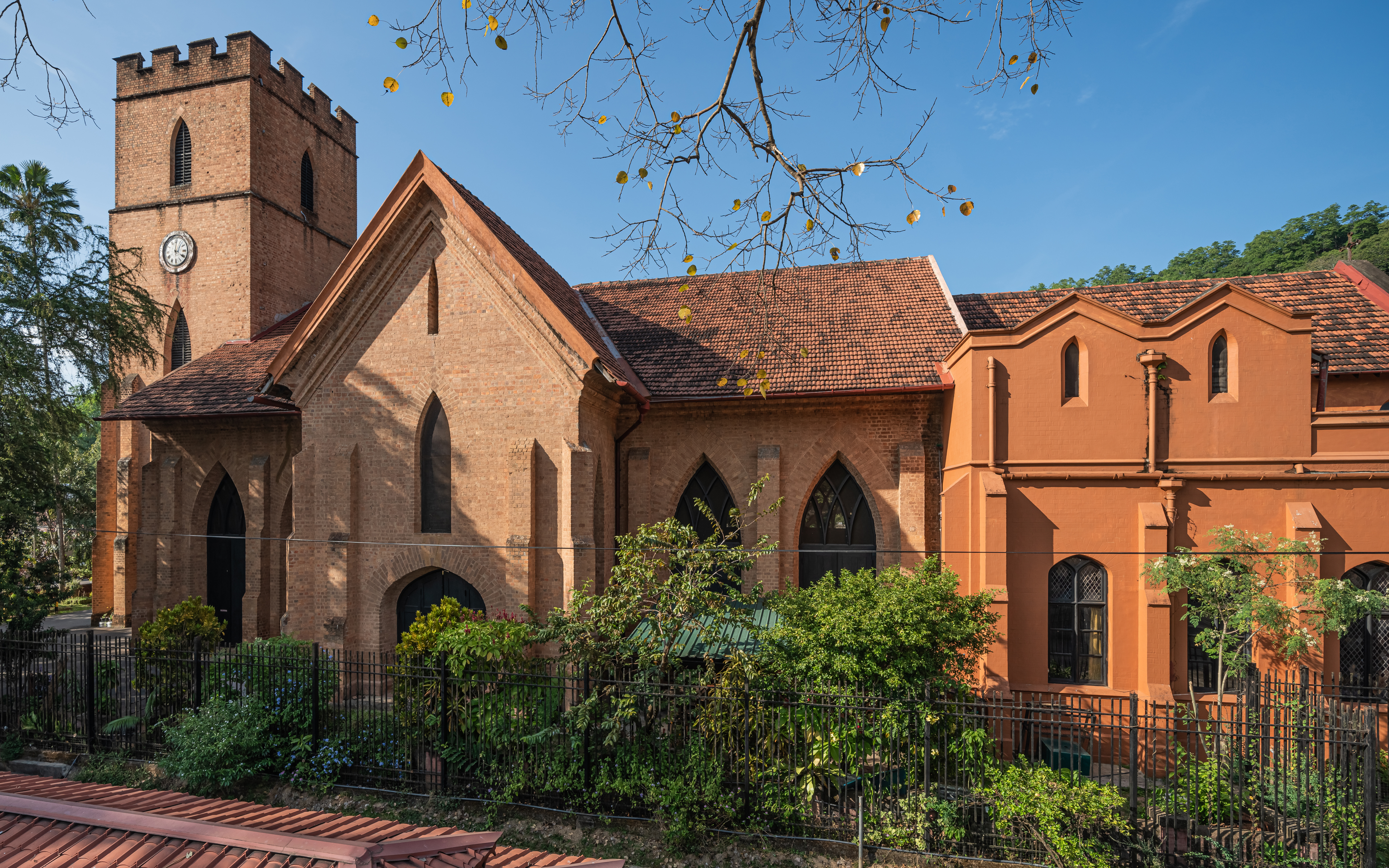
- Southern side of the church
- St. Paul's Church
- 7°17′40.3″N 80°38′22.9″E
- Location: Kandy, Sri Lanka
- Denomination: Anglican, Church of Ceylon

Clergy
- Vicar: Rev. Rasika Abeysinghe
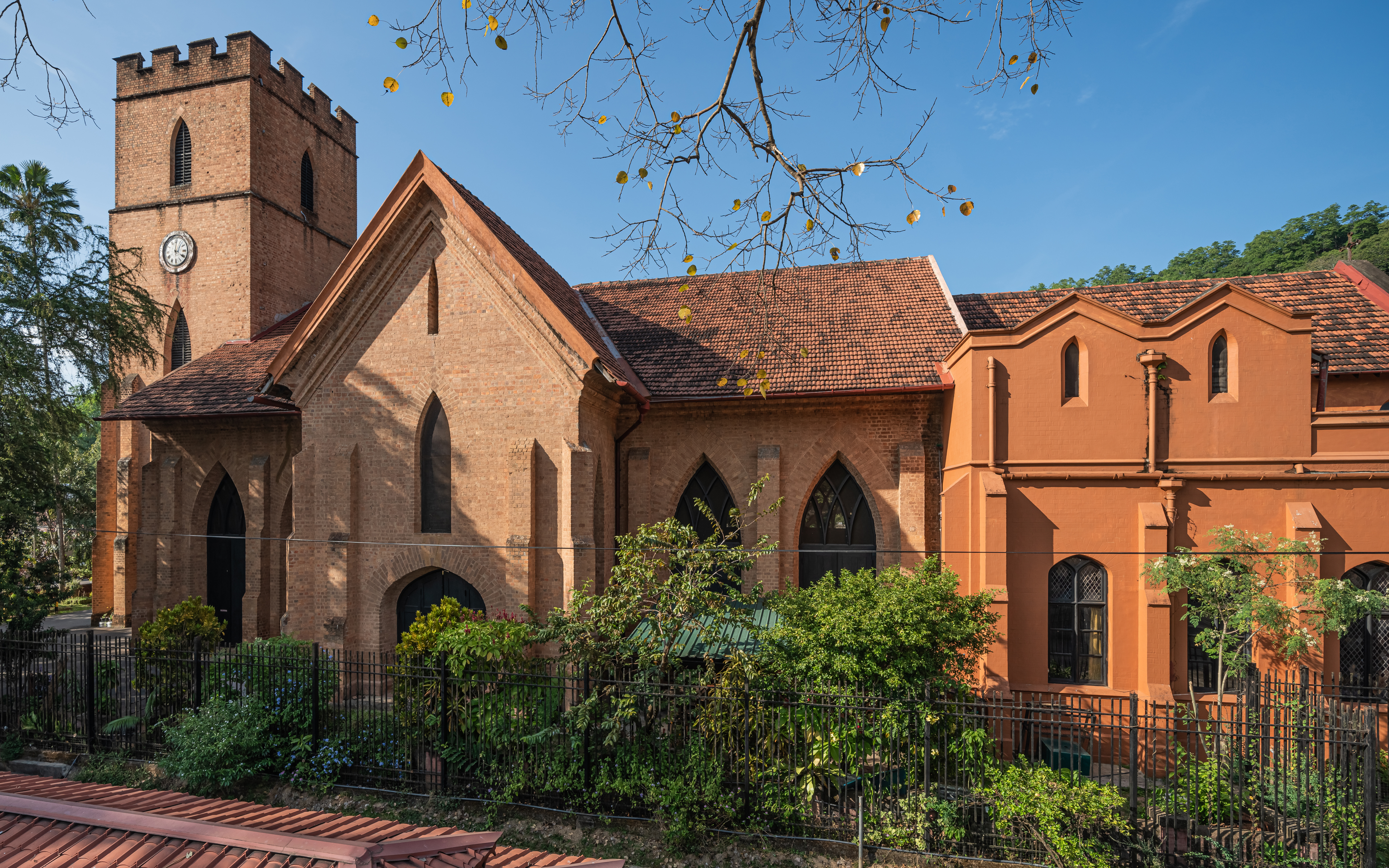

Religion
- Year consecrated: 25 January 1853
- Status: Active

Location
- Interactive map of St. Paul's Church, Kandy

Architecture
- Type: Church
- Style: Neo-Gothic
- General contractor: Affleck and Gordon, Engineers
- Groundbreaking: 16 March 1843
- Completed: 1852
- Direction of façade: towards west
- Archaeological Protected Monument of Sri Lanka
- Designated: 8 July 2005

Website
- www.stpaulschurchkandy.lk

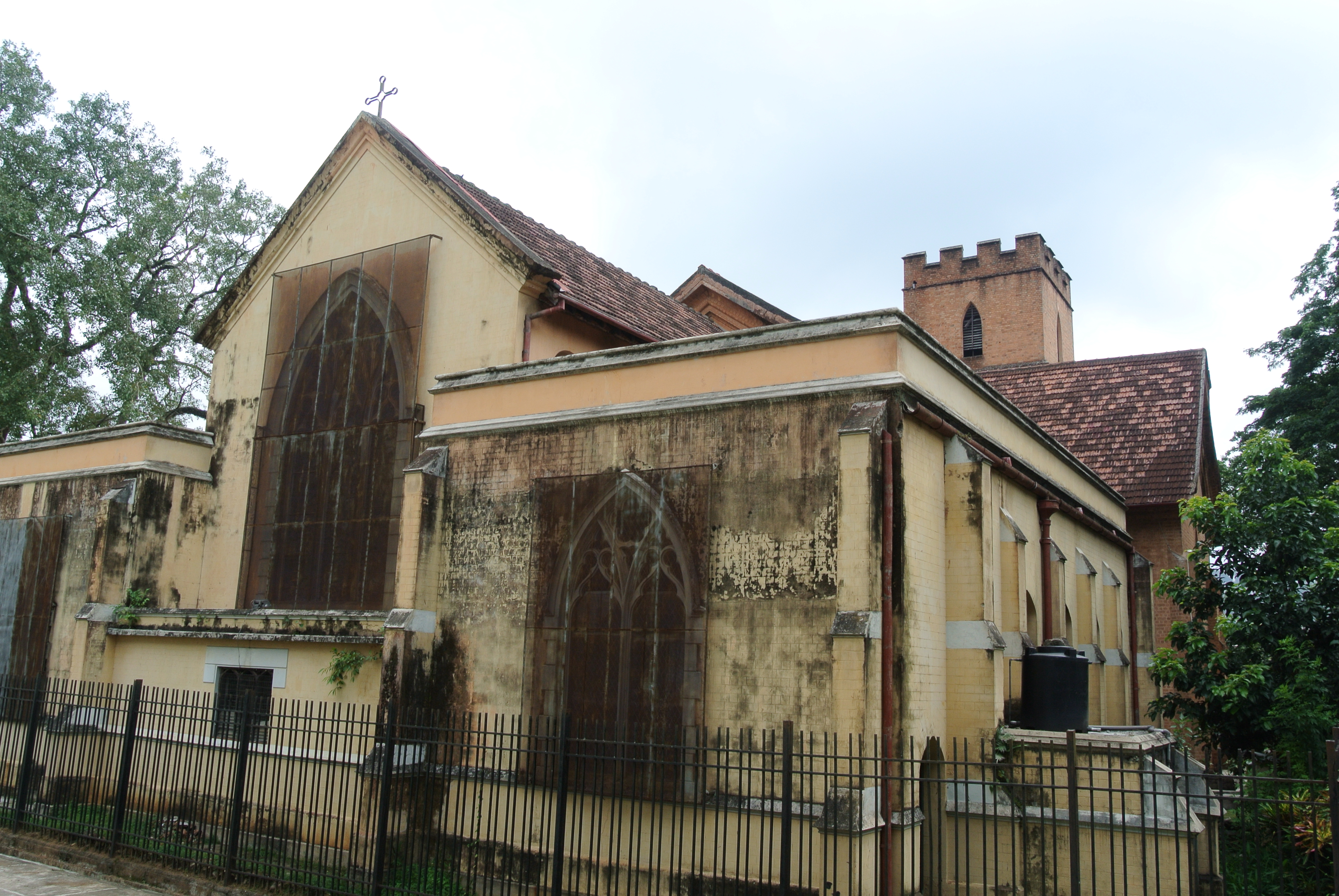
East end of the church

St. Paul's Church (Sinhala: ශාන්ත පාවුළු දේවස්ථානය) is an Anglican church in the historical district of Kandy, Sri Lanka west of the Temple of the Tooth.

== History ==
In 1825 the Bishop of Calcutta, Reginald Heber, visited Kandy with the Governor of Ceylon, Edward Barnes, to preach and conduct a confirmation service. He noted that the church services were being held in the former King of Kandy's Audience Hall, a location he associated with 'horrid cruelties'. Heber also recognised the need for a purpose-built church to serve the needs of the garrison and the local community.

In 1841 a public subscription list was established to fund the construction of the church.

In 1843 the British Government ceded a block of Crown land to the trustees of the church and their successors in order to construct a church in Kandy.

The foundation stone of the church was laid by the Bishop of Madras George Spencer on 16 March 1843 and whilst it was first used on 10 August 1846 construction work was still in progress. The church was primarily constructed out of solid terracotta bricks, manufactured at the Government brickworks. The church wasn't completed until 1852. The church was formally consecrated on 25 January 1853 (Feast day of the conversion of St. Paul) by the first Bishop of Colombo, James Chapman.

The church was enlarged in 1878 by Archdeacon Matthew, with addition of a chancel, vestry, and organ chamber. The bricks however were inferior to the original and therefore concreted over. In 1926 a number of significant cracks appeared in the church walls and the eastern section of the building was declared unsafe. The rebuilding of this section facilitated a new extension to the church, the 50-seat Lady Chapel, which was completed and dedicated in August 1928.

As it was first used by British officials and the British Garrison, it has been called the Garrison Church.

The architectural style is Neo-Gothic, and the interior is a piece of English Victoriana.

It is an Anglican church, affiliated to the Church of Ceylon.

The church houses the only pipe organ in Kandy and potentially, the largest pipe organ in regular use in Sri Lanka. The original pipe organ was donated in 1874 and was in constant use until the 21st century. In 2009 it was replaced with a similar-sized pipe organ from a disused church in Bradford.

== See also ==
- Church of Ceylon
