= Church of Ceylon =

Anglican Church in Sri Lanka

- ලංකා සභාව
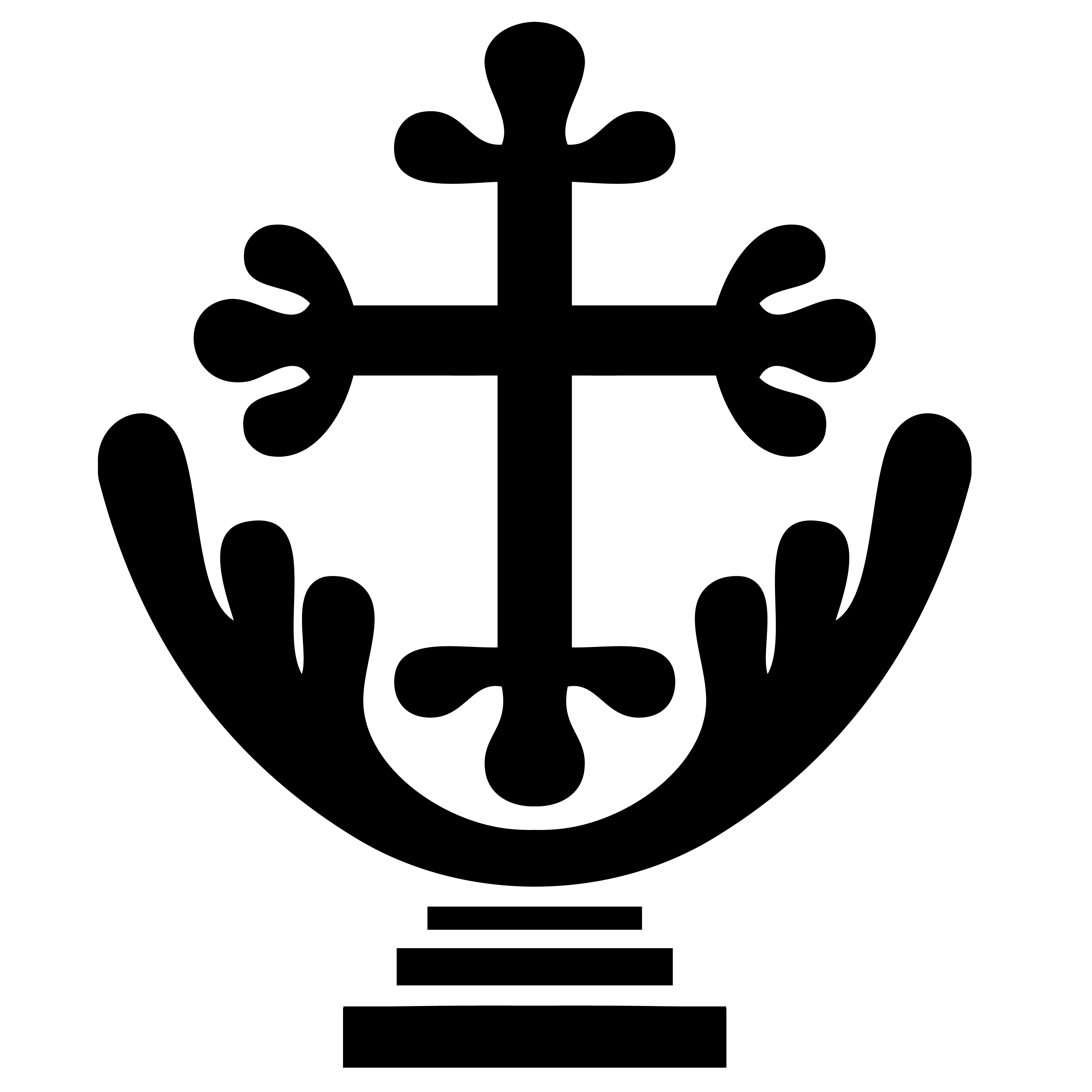
- Anuradhapura cross, featuring in church logos
- Classification: Protestant
- Orientation: Anglican
- Scripture: Holy Bible
- Theology: Anglican doctrine
- Polity: Episcopal
- Governance: Church Mission Society
- Primate: Sarah Mullally, Archbishop of Canterbury
- Anglican Bishop of Colombo: Dushantha Lakshman Rodrigo
- Bishop of Kurunegala: Nishantha Fernando
- Notable Schools: Ceylon School for the Deaf and Blind, Ratmalana; S. Thomas' College, Mount Lavinia.; Ladies' College, Colombo 07.; Trinity College, Kandy.; Bishop's College, Colombo 03.
- Language: English, Sinhalese & Tamil
- Headquarters: 368/3a Bauddaloka Mawatha, Colombo, Sri Lanka
- Territory: Sri Lanka
- Founder: James Chapman
- Origin: 1815
- Recognition: Church of England
- Members: 54,200
- Other name: Church of England
- Publications: The Churchman, Monthly gift
- Official website: https://churchofceylonlk.com/

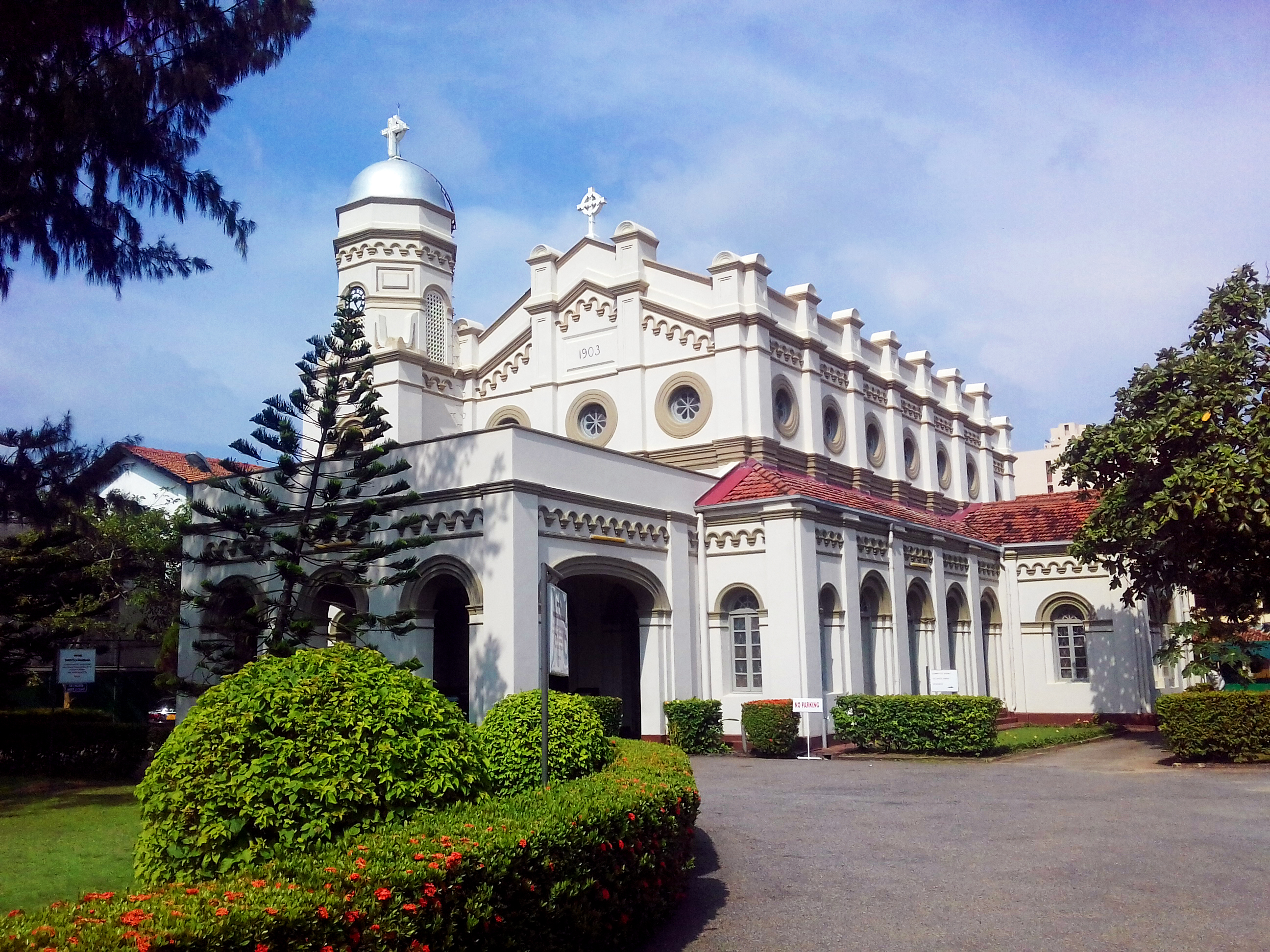
St. Paul's Church (Milagiriya) in the diocese of Colombo

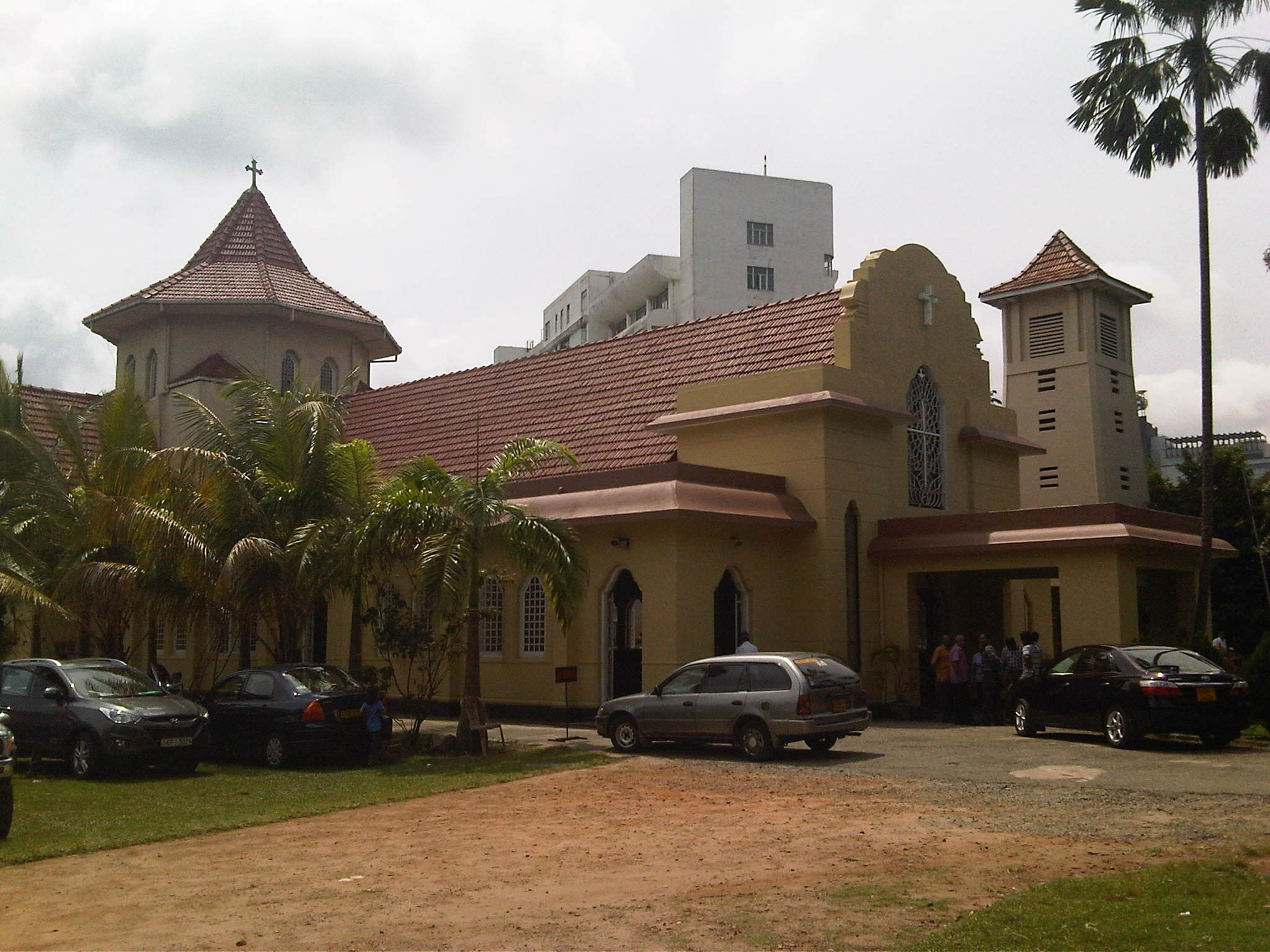
St. Luke's Church Borella in Colombo

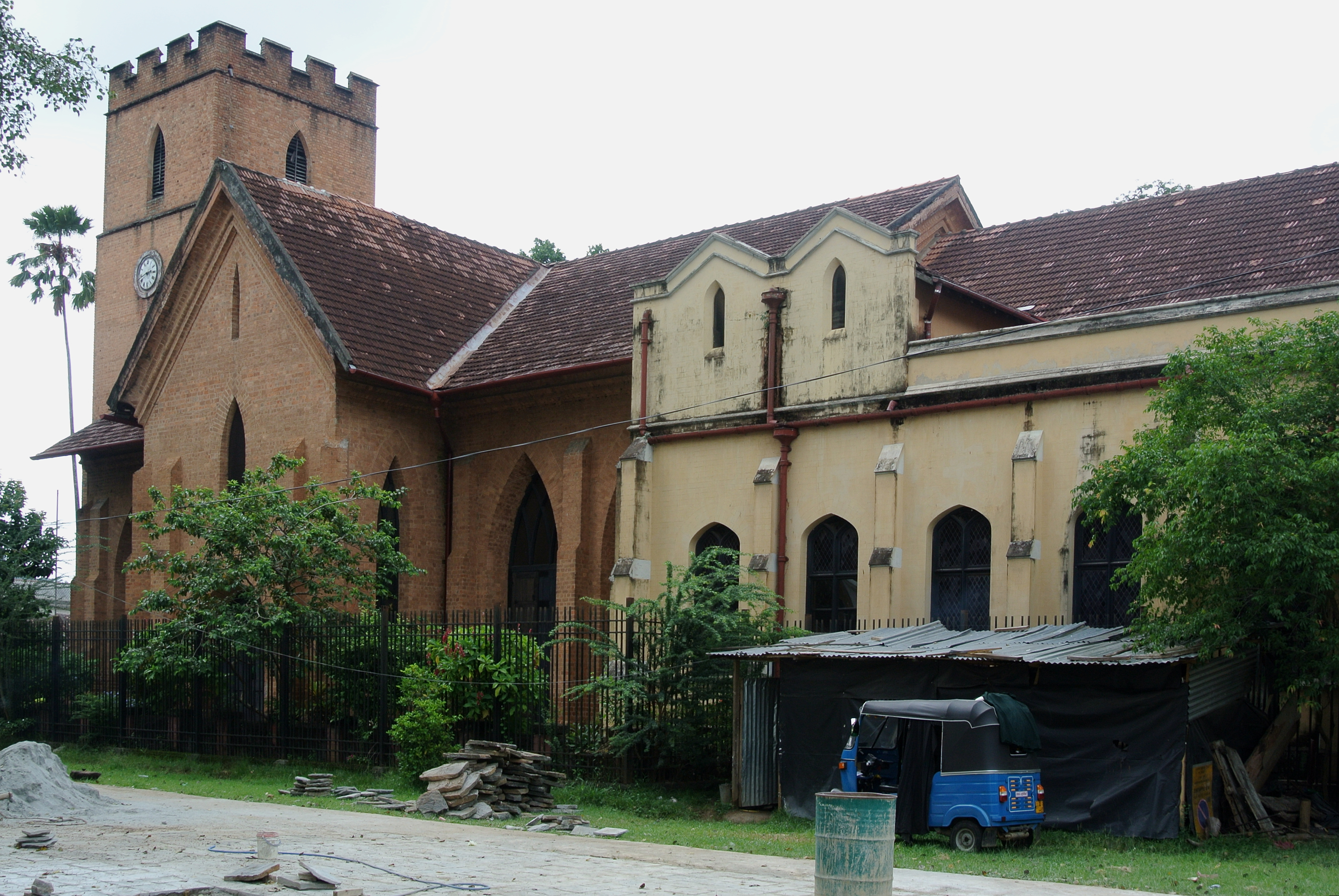
St. Paul's Church in Kandy, diocese of Kurunegala

The Church of Ceylon (Sinhala: ලංකා සභාව, romanized: laṁkā sabhāva) is the Anglican Church in Sri Lanka. It is an extraprovincial jurisdiction of the Archbishop of Canterbury, who serves as its Metropolitan. It was established in 1845 with the appointment of the first Anglican Bishop of Colombo, James Chapman and until 1950 it consisted of a single diocese; in that year a second diocese was established at Kurunegala. In 2017, Growth and Decline in the Anglican Communion: 1980 to the Present, published by Routledge, collected research reporting there were 54,200 Anglicans in Sri Lanka.

== Dioceses of Colombo and Kurunegala ==
The first services were held on the island in 1796 by Thomas James Twisleton who arrived in Ceylon in 1804 was named by Bishop of Calcutta in year 1815 to be the Archdeacon of Colombo (his office was formally constituted when Royal Letters Patent were issued under the Great Seal in April 1818) alongside its other missionaries sent to Ceylon to begin work in 1818.

The Church of Ceylon established as the successor to the Church of England in Ceylon, following its incorporation in Parliament by Act No 6 of 1972, and now has two dioceses, one in Colombo (covering the Western, Southern, Eastern, Northern and Uva provinces and Ratnapura, Nuwara Eliya and Puttalam districts) and the other in Kurunegala (covering Kurunegala, Kandy, Matale and Kegalla, Anuradhapura, Polonnaruwa, districts). The Diocese of Colombo was founded in 1845 and the Diocese of Kurunegala in 1950.

The Bishop of Calcutta was the Metropolitan Bishop of India and Ceylon from 10 October 1835. In 1930 Ceylon was included in the Church of India, Burma and Ceylon (from 1948 the Church of India, Pakistan, Burma, and Ceylon) until 1970. In 1970, the Church of the Province of Myanmar, the Church of Ceylon, and the Church of Pakistan were separated from the CIBC (and the province of Calcutta).

There has been a movement for the amalgamation of traditional Protestant churches (including Church of Ceylon, Methodist Church, Lanka Baptist Sangamaya, Salvation Army, Presbyterian Church of Sri Lanka and the Christian Reformed Church of Sri Lanka (formerly the Dutch Reformed Church) and the Jaffna Diocese of the Church of South India into one body, namely the Church of Sri Lanka.

The Anglican Bishop of Colombo, Dushantha Lakshman Rodrigo has four archdeaconries, namely, Colombo, Galle, Jaffna and Upcountry and East. Keerthisiri Fernando the 6th Bishop of Kurunegala has one archdeaconry.

The Church of Ceylon with around 50,000 members, is the second largest group of Christians in Sri Lanka, after the Catholic Church with 1,600,000 members.

== Church and education ==
The missionaries of the Church Missionary Society established many schools in all parts of the island. The missionaries who arrived in Galle started to establish schools in order to uplift the education of the natives and to spread the Christian religion. Robert Mayor who arrived on 29 June 1818 was the 1st missionary to establish a school in the "Church Hill", Baddegama under the name of "Christ Church" adjoining the Baddegama seminary.

During the early years, the Society for the Propagation of the Gospel (SPG), the ‘high church’ missionary society, assisted the early bishops of the Diocese of Colombo (Anglican) to set up schools. The SPG helped Bishop James Chapman establish the College of Saint Thomas the Apostle in Mutwal, which opened on 3 February 1851. Later the college was shifted to Mt. Lavinia. The SPG continued to support the college until they withdrew from Ceylon in 1930.

By the year 1910 the Anglican church had 403 schools with a student population of 32,783. A teacher training college was established in 1914 in Peradeniya by Alexander G. Fraser, principal of Trinity College, Kandy. The Anglican schools in Sri Lanka provide education in English, Sinhala and Tamil languages giving prominence to the English Language.

The schools are independently and privately managed by the CMS governing body headed by the bishops of the church, while some schools like Trinity College Kandy have adopted a board of governors under the patronage of the Bishop of Kurunegala.

From the past Anglican schools have produced many notable personalities. Prime ministers D. S. Senanayake, Dudley Senanayake, Wijayananda Dahanayake and S. W. R. D. Bandaranaike were past pupils of S. Thomas' College, Mount Lavinia as well as Leslie Goonewardene and N. M. Perera, founders of Ceylon's first political party.

Leading Anglican schools in Sri Lanka

1. S. Thomas' College, Mount Lavinia
2. Trinity College, Kandy
3. Hillwood College
4. Ladies' College, Colombo
5. Bishop's College, Colombo
6. CMS Mowbray College, Kandy
7. S. Thomas' Preparatory School
8. S. Thomas' College, Gurutalawa
9. S. Thomas' College, Bandarawela
10. St. John's College, Jaffna
11. Chundikuli Girls' College
12. St. Paul's Girls School, Milagiriya
13. St. Thomas' College, Matara
14. Christ Church College, Matale
15. All Saints College, Galle
16. St. John's College, Nugegoda
17. St. John's College, Panadura
18. Christ Church Boys' College, Baddegama
19. Christ Church Girls' College, Baddegama
20. Bishop Lakdasa De Mel College, Kurunegala
21. St Andrew's Girls College, Nawalapitiya
22. Holy Trinity College, Nuwara Eliya

Ecclesiastical Leadership: The Archdeacons of Colombo since 1818

1. Thomas James Twistleton - 1815
2. James Moncrieff Sutherland Glenie - 1828
3. Benjamin Bailey - 1847
4. John Alexander Mathias - 1854
5. John Wise - 1861
6. Edward Mooyaart - 1964
7. Samuel Owen Genie - 1870
8. Justus George Shrader - 1873
9. Walter Edmund Mathew - 1883
10. Edward Francis Miller - 1889
11. Charles Twyning Boyd - 1891
12. Frederick Henry De Winton - 1902
13. Guy Vernon Smith - 1925
14. Noel Charles Christopherson - 1929
15. Francis Lorenz Beven - 1935
16. Arthur James Kendall Baker - 1945
17. Charles Harold Wilfred De Soysa - 1955
18. Cyril Linden Abeynaike - 1964
19. Swithin Winston Fernando - 1971
20. Jabez Jebasir Gnanapragasam - 1978
21. Coultas Edward Godwin Weerasuriya - 1987
22. Chrishantha Mendis - 2004
23. David Nigel Perry Brohier - 2014
24. Christopher Balraj - 2023

== Hymn for Ceylon ==
In the early 20th century an Anglican missionary, W. S. Senior popularly known as the Bard of Lanka arrived in Ceylon to work with the Church Missionary Society. He was Vice-Principal of Trinity College, Kandy for many years and spent three decades in the country. W. S. Senior wrote the 'Hymn for Ceylon,' sung to this day in churches on the island. The music for parts of this hymn was composed in 1950 by the leading Sri Lankan folk musician Deva Suriya Sena.

== See also ==
- Christianity in Sri Lanka
- Anglican Bishop of Colombo
- Bishop of Kurunegala
- Cathedral of Christ the Living Saviour
- Cathedral of Christ the King, Kurunegala
- St. Paul's Church, Kandy
- Trinity College Chapel, Kandy
- Church of Ceylon church buildings in Sri Lanka
- Theological College of Lanka
