= Diocese of Kurunegala (Anglican) =

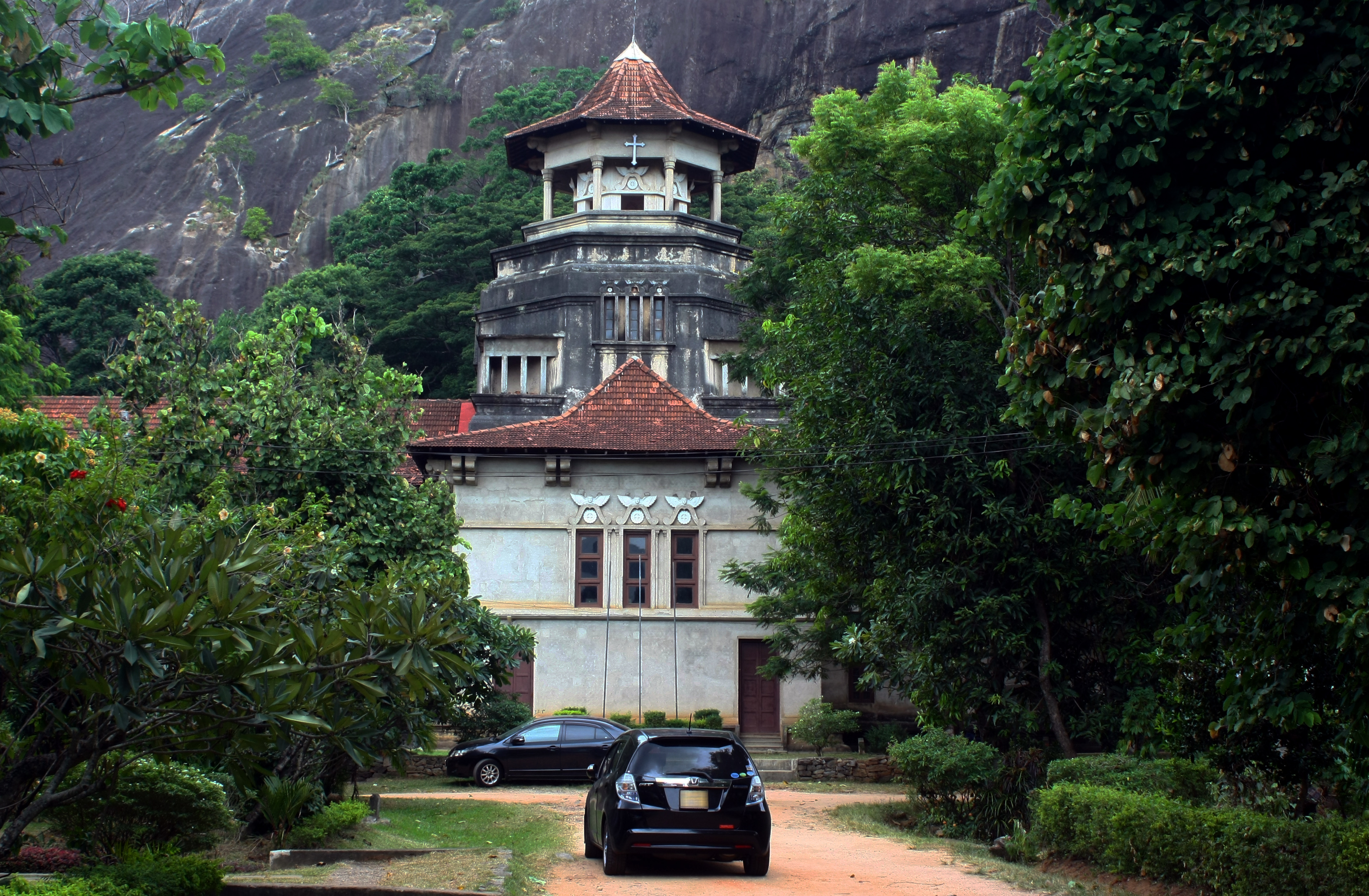
- Cathedral of Christ the King, Kurunegala

Location
- Country: Sri Lanka
- Territory: Kurunegala, Kandy, Matale, Kegalle, Anuradhapura, and Polonnaruwa Districts
- Ecclesiastical province: Extra-Provincial Diocese
- Metropolitan: Sarah Mullally

Statistics
- Schools: Trinity College Kandy

Information
- Denomination: Church of Ceylon
- Rite: Anglican / Christian
- Established: 1950
- Cathedral: Cathedral of Christ the King, Kurunegala
- Language: Sinhala, Tamil, English

Current leadership
- Bishop of Kurunegala: Nishantha Fernando

Map
- Map of the Diocese of Kurunegala

The Diocese of Kurunegala is a diocese of the Church of Ceylon (which is part of the Anglican Communion). The See was erected in 1950 from that of the Diocese of Colombo as one of two dioceses of the Church of England in Ceylon. Both dioceses of the Church of Ceylon function as extra-provincial dioceses subject to the Archbishop of Canterbury.

The diocese covers the districts of Kurunegala, Kandy, Matale, Kegalle, Anuradhapura, and Polonnaruwa.

== List of bishops ==
Bishops of Kurunegala
| From | Until | Incumbent | Notes |
|---|---|---|---|
| 1950 | 1962 | Lakdasa De Mel | First Bishop of Kurunegala, installed on 2 February 1950; installed in May 1962 as Metropolitan Bishop of India, Pakistan, Burma and Ceylon |
| 1962 | 1983 | Lakshman Wickremasinghe | One of the youngest bishops in the Anglican Communion |
| 1983 | 2000 | Andrew Kumarage | |
| 2000 | 2010 | Kumara Illangasinghe | |
| 2010 | 2015 | Shantha Francis | First Tamil bishop, resigned in January 2015 |
| 2015 | 2017 | vacant | |
| 2018 | 2022 | Keerthisiri Fernando | Former archdeacon of Nuwara Eliya |
| 2023 | present | Nishantha Fernando | Ordination on 19 March 2023 |

== See also ==
- Cathedral of Christ the King, Kurunegala

== Publications ==
- One hundred years in Ceylon, or, The centenary volume of the Church Missionary Society in Ceylon, 1818-1918 (1922) Author: Balding, John William Madras: Printed at the Diocesan Press.
- The Church of Ceylon - her faith and mission Published in 1945, Printed at the Daily News Press by Bernard de Silva for the Church of Ceylon.
- The Church of Ceylon: A History, 1945-1995 Editor: Medis, Frederick, Published for the Diocese of Colombo.
