= St Michael and All Angels Church, Polwatte =

Saint Michael and All Angels Church, Polwatte
- කොල්ලුපිටිය ගල් පල්ලිය
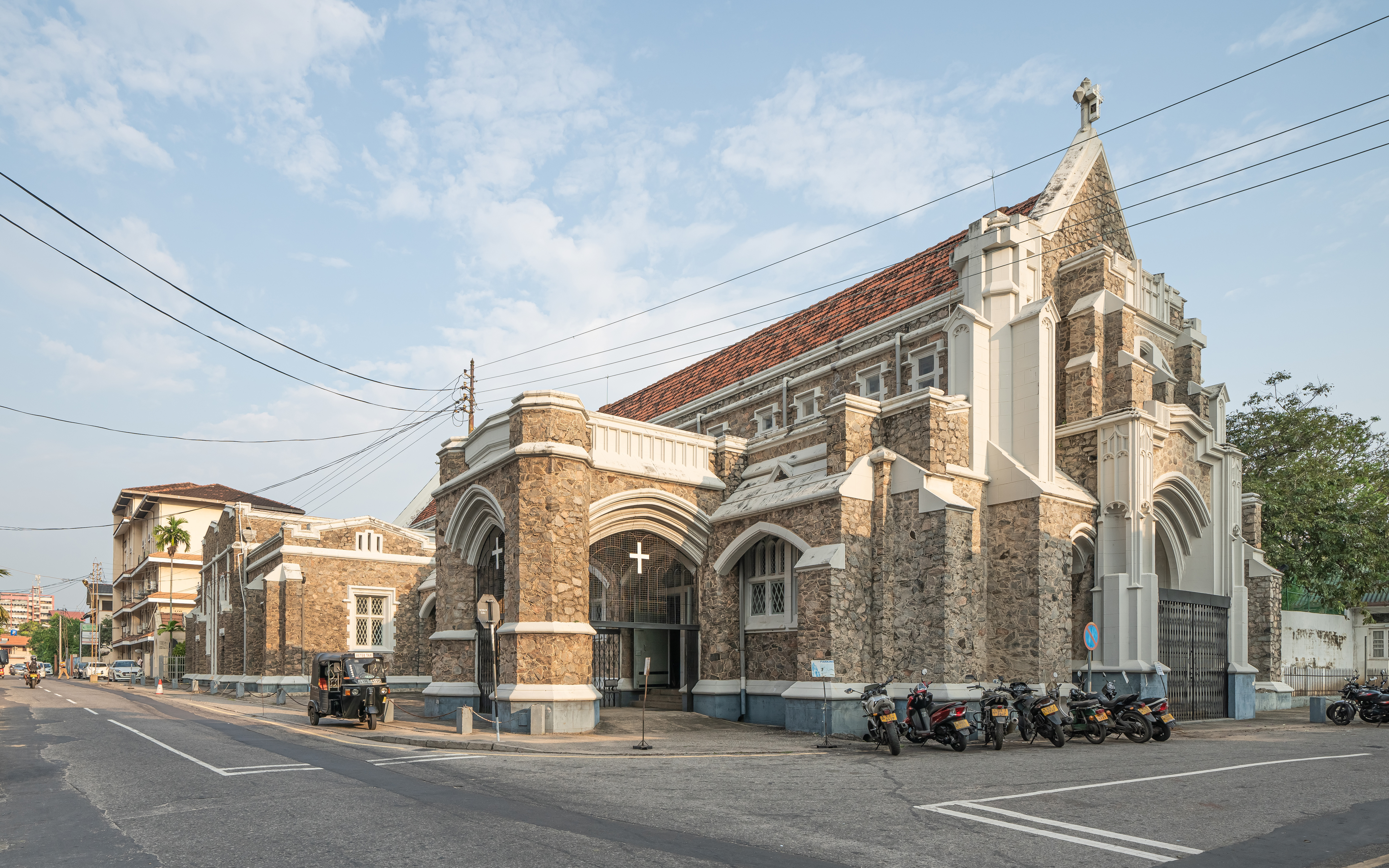
- Saint Michael and All Angels Church, Polwatte
- Location: 138 St Michael’s Road, Polwatte, Colombo Sri Lanka
- Denomination: Anglican Church of Ceylon

History
- Status: Church
- Consecrated: 29 September 1887

Architecture
- Functional status: Active
- Completed: 1865

Administration
- Metropolis: Archbishop of Canterbury
- Diocese: Colombo

Clergy
- Vicar: Ven. Christopher Balraj (Archdeacon of Colombo)

St Michael and All Angels Church, Polwatte (Sinhala: කොල්ලුපිටිය ගල් පල්ලිය) is located in Kollupitiya, a suburb of Colombo, Sri Lanka.

== History ==
In 1844 Rev. Solomon David from Kotahena began holding regular services in a house in the area. In 1853 the first chapel in Polwatte, located near the present junction of Hudson’s Road and Mohandiram’s Lane, was dedicated to St. Thomas by Bishop James Chapman. The chapel was essentially a small building with a cadjan roof and half walls. The chapel was accidentally burnt down in 1864, when fireworks as part of the chapel's anniversary celebrations went awry.

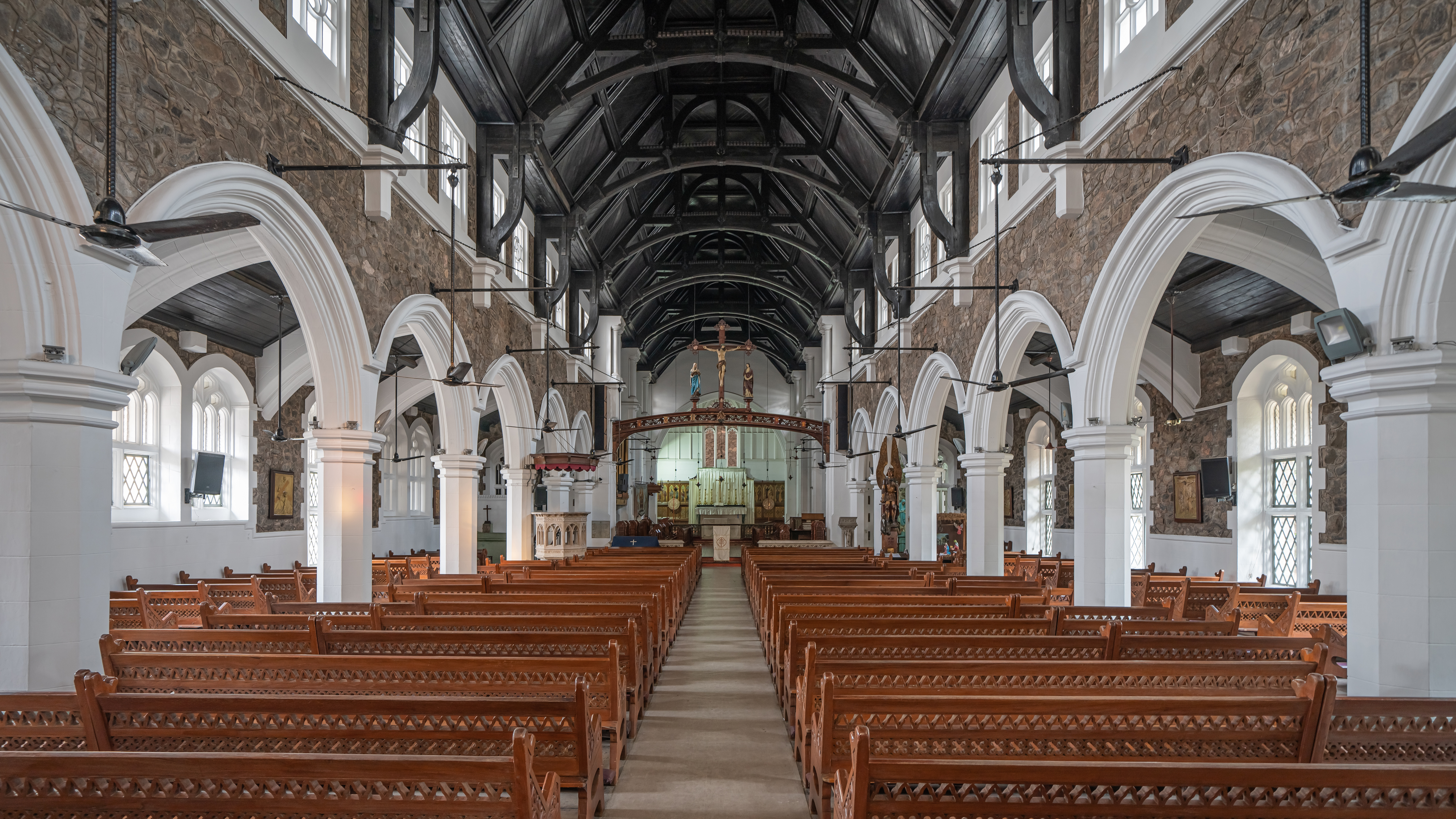
Church interior

A new chapel was the constructed on the present site was erected in 1865. Two years later it was enlarged and dedicated to St. Thomas on his feast day, 21 December 1867 by Bishop Piers Claughton. In 1886 Archdeacon Walter Edmond Matthew introduced services in English and proposed that the name be changed to 'Church of the Good Shepherd' to avoid confusion with a similar named church in Kotahena. The congregation however decided upon St Michael and All Angels, with the church dedicated on St. Michael’s Day, 29 September 1887. Rev. P. B. Moonemale was appointed as the first resident priest. In 1896 two aisles were added to the church. In 1899 two new parishes were formed, St. Paul's Church, Milagiriya and St. Michael’s.

In 1918 the decision was made to enlarge the church however it became apparent that an entirely new church building was required. The first part of the new church was consecrated by Bishop Ernest Copleston on 20 November 1919, with construction of the whole church completed in 1922 and the church was re-consecrated on St. Michael’s Day, that year, by Bishop Copleston.

Worship services are held in English, Sinhala and Tamil.
