= Holy Trinity Church, Nuwara Eliya =

Coordinates: 6°57′44″N 80°45′58″E

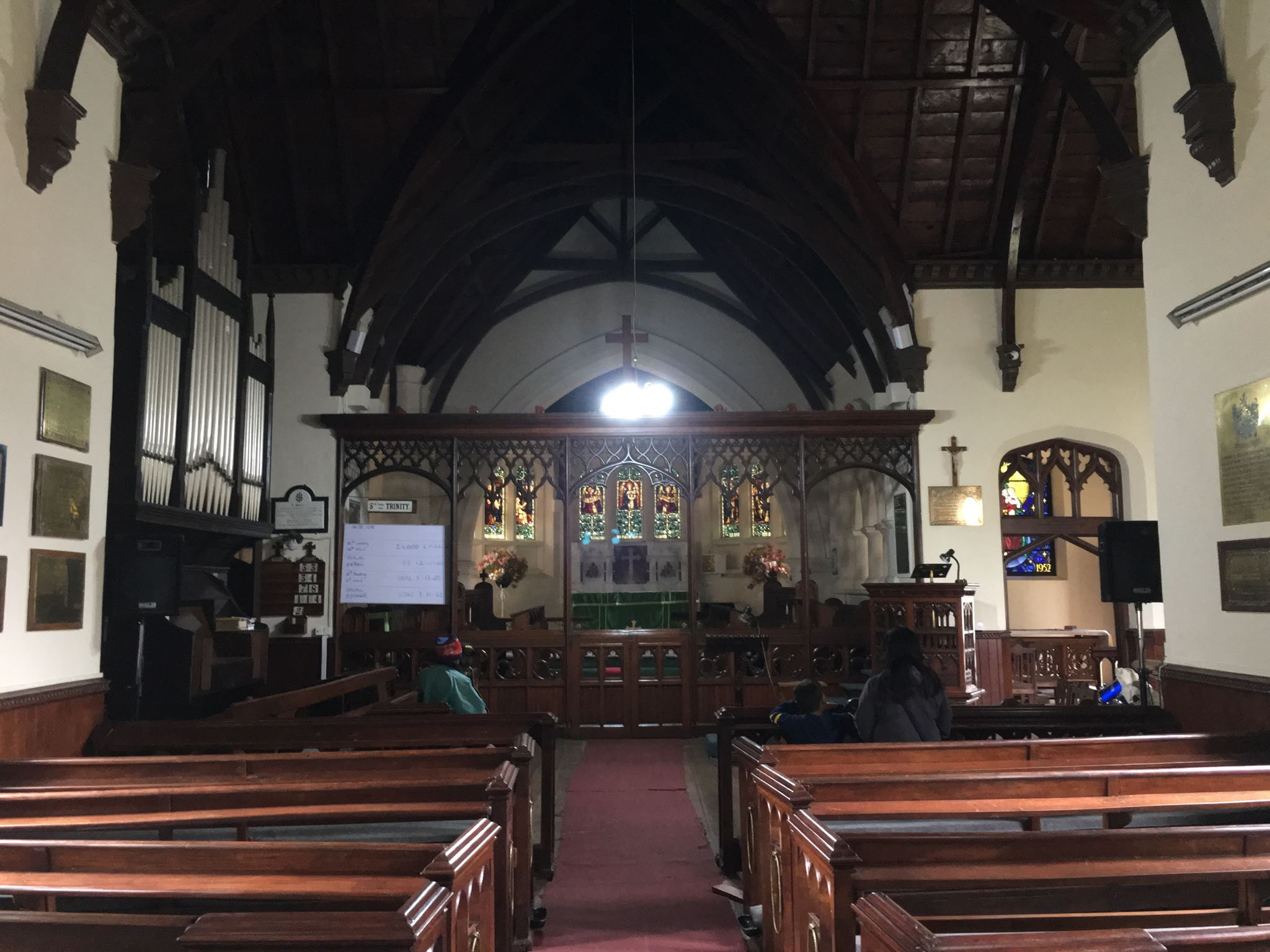
- The Sanctuary at Holy Trinity Church, Nuwara Eliya
- Holy Trinity Church, Nuwara Eliya
- Location: Church Road, Nuwara Eliya, Sri Lanka
- Denomination: Anglican (Church of Ceylon)
- Website: Holy Trinity Church, Nuwara Eliya

History
- Consecrated: 24 February 1852

Architecture
- Functional status: Active
- Architect: Captain Nelson
- Architectural type: Church
- Style: early English Gothic
- Groundbreaking: 1845
- Completed: 1852

Administration
- Diocese: Diocese of Colombo
- Archdeaconry: Nuwara Eliya Archdeaconry

Clergy
- Vicar: Revd. Ruben Pradeep Rajendran

Archaeological Protected Monument of Sri Lanka
- Designated: 23 February 2007

Holy Trinity Church is an Anglican church in Nuwara Eliya in Sri Lanka.

== History ==
On 5 May 1845, a committee comprising Reverend Hermann Randall von Dadelszen, Colonel James Campbell, Colonel William Henry Slade (Royal Engineers), Captain Nelson (Royal Engineers), Lieutenant Albert Watson (Ceylon Rifle Regiment), E. R. Power (Ceylon Civil Service), H. C. Selby, C. Temple and E. F. Gepp met to discuss the construction of a church in Nuwara Eliya, at an estimated cost of £900. Captain Nelson designed the building with the construction work done chiefly by the officers and men of the local garrison of the 15th Regiment, under the supervision of Major James Brunker.

It took seven years after building commenced for the church to be completed. Upon its completion it was consecrated by Bishop James Chapman on 24 February 1852 (St. Matthias’ Day). The first vicar of the Holy Trinity Church, from 1843 to 1846, was Rev. von Dadelszen.

In the late 1890s the congregation proposed enlarging the Church, there was however some opposition, who proposed the construction of a new Church near the old cemetery. The majority of the congregation however preferred the existing site. In 1889 the church was enlarged. The original portion of the building is at the church's western end. The additions can be noted by the difference in size of the corbels supporting the main rafters.

On 18 April 1954 Queen Elizabeth II and Prince Philip, Duke of Edinburgh attended services at the Holy Trinity church, with the Queen gifting a blue carpet and a stained glass window in remembrance of their visit.

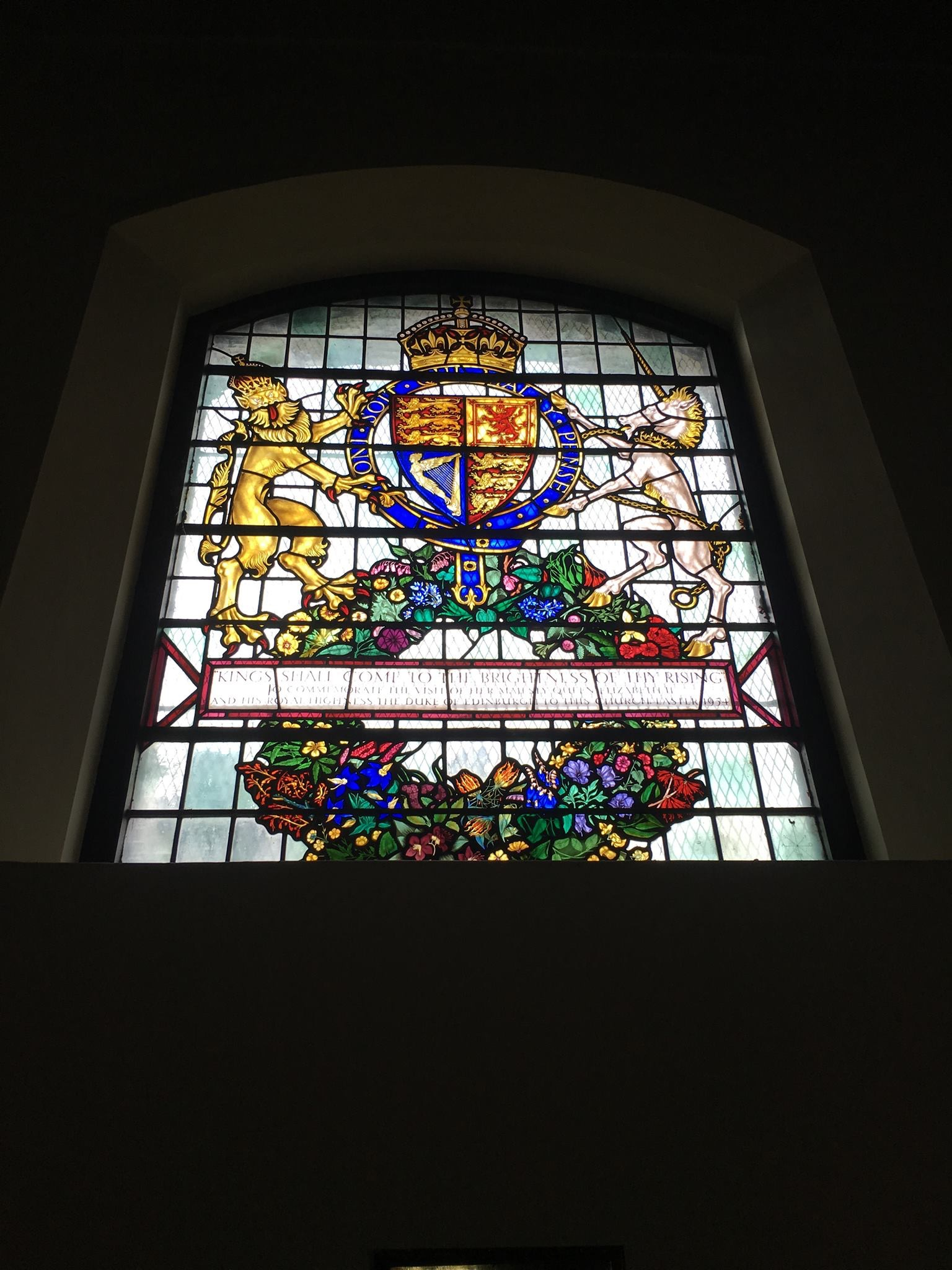
Queen Elizabeth II commemorative stained glass window

In 2001 the 100 year old Pipe Organ, which had been out of order for over 30 years, was restored at a cost of approximately half a million rupees.

There are a number of memorial plaques on the church walls including Dr. G. Gardner, Superintendent of the Royal Botanical Gardens, Peradeniya; Captain William Fisher, father of Lord John Fisher, who was thrown off his horse and killed; Reginald Beauchamp Downall, tea planter, Legislative Council member; and Lady Carolina Ridgeway, wife of Sir Joseph West Ridgeway, Governor of Ceylon.

The churchyard also several tombstones, including ones for Lady Olive Mary Caldecott, wife of Sir Andrew Caldecott, the penultimate Governor of Ceylon, and the family members of Sir Samuel Baker.
