= Battle of the Golds (Moratuwa) =

Annual School Cricket Match Series

Prince of Wales–St. Sebastian's Cricket Encounter "The Battle of the Golds Moratuwa "

- Prince of Wales' College St. Sebastian's College
- Native name: මොරටු මහා රන් සටන (Moratu Mahā Ran Satana)
- Other names: "The Battle of the Golds"
- Sport: Cricket
- Type: 3-day match (Previously 2-day) (Test match); 1-day limited over match (50 overs); Twenty20 match
- Location: Moratuwa, Sri Lanka
- First meeting: 1933
- Latest meeting: 2026
- Next meeting: 2027
- Broadcasters: Cambrians' Media and Broadcasting Unit, SEBS MEDIA, Dialog TV and ThePapare.com
- Stadiums: De Soysa Stadium (Tyronne Fernando Stadium); Singhalese Sports Club Cricket Ground; R. Premadasa Stadium; P. Sara Oval Stadium
- Trophy: Cambrian - Sebastianite Challenge trophy (Other trophies list)

Statistics
- Total meetings: 3-day match – 76; 1-day match – 41; T20 match – 04
- All-time record: 3-day match – PWC leads, 6–4–66; 1-day match – SSC leads, 21–16–4; T20 match – SSC leads, 4–0
- Longest win streak: 3-day match – PWC, 3 (1935–1937); 1-day match – SSC, 4 (2015–2018); T20 match – SSC, 4 (2023–2026)

Location Map
1 Prince of Wales' College
2 St. Sebastian's College
3 De Soysa Stadium
4 Singhalese Sports Club Cricket Ground
5 R. Premadasa Stadium
6 P. Sara Oval Stadium

The Prince of Wales'–St. Sebastian's Cricket Encounter (The Battle of the Golds) is an annual cricket match played between Prince of Wales' College (PWC) and St. Sebastian's College (SSC) since 1933. It is known as The Battle of the Golds due to the colours of the two school's flags i.e. Purple, Gold and Maroon of Prince of Wales' College and Green, White & Gold of St. Sebastian's College.

== History ==
The encounter is considered to be one of the oldest big matches in Sri Lanka as it dates back to 1933. The first match in the sequence was played in 1933 under captain, Eugine Silva of St. Sebastian's College and Duncan Fernando of Prince of Wales College. The inaugural match however ended in a low scoring draw. In 1935 the Cambrians (Note: Students of Prince of Wales' College are known as Cambrians) made history by recording the first win of the series with Ernie F. de Mel leading the side. De Mel's side registered a thrilling 4-wicket win against their rivals led by Earl Wijesinghe. The Cambrians led by KM Jayasekara went on to register back-to-back wins in the following two years by a thrilling 43-runs in 1936 and a comfortable innings and 87 runs in 1937. On both occasions, K.A.S Perera captained St. Sebastian's. There was a break in the series from 1938 to 1953.

The series resumed in 1954 with the match ending in a high-scoring draw. In 1955 Raymond de Silva's Sebastianites (Note: Students of St. Sebastian's College are known as Sebastianites or Bastians) lost to the Cambrians for the fourth time by 9 wickets. Prince of Wales' was led by Stanley de Alwis. Draws followed for the next three years and Prince of Wales' expanded their winning tally to 5–nil in 1959 with an emphatic innings and 56-run win. Suranjith Mendis led the winning side while his counterpart was Sirimal Fernando. The encounter continued in stalemates for two years and in 1962 St. Sebastian's got their first-ever victory under Priyantha Fernando. They beat the Cambrians led by Hyasti Aponso by 5 wickets. After three consecutive draws, St. Sebastian's recorded their second win under Sarath Perera. Perera's side beat the Cambrians captained by Leslie de Silva by massive innings and 152 runs. Deadlocks followed for a decade until the Cambrians led by Pemlal Fernando recorded an 8-wicket win in a low-scoring encounter against Walter Fernando's Sebastianites.

Since the start, the Cambrians have six wins while the Sebastianites have won four times in the series with the rest ending in draws. St Sebastian's had their last victory in 2024 under the guidance of Captain Manuja Chanthuka. Prince of Wales's has not won a match since 1977.

Among the outstanding performances in the encounter Nilantha Bopage from Prince of Wales holds the record for the highest run scorer in a match with 179 not out in 1991. For the Sebastian's Nalin Peiris was the highest scorer with two centuries in years 1957 and 1958. Among the leading wicket takers, the record for the most number of wickets in the series is held by Roger Wijesuriya taking 22 wickets for St. Sebastians from 1975 to 1979.

Limited Over match started in 1981. It wasn't played between 1983 and 1987. Twenty20 match was started in 2023 and the inaugural match was played at R. Premadasa Stadium. Twenty20 match is played for Rev. Fr. Bonnie Fernandopulle & M.E.C. Fernando Memorial Challenge Trophy. From the beginning to 2024 Test format encounter was played as a 2-day match, but starting from 2025, it is being played as a 3-day encounter.

Highest Aggregate of Runs in the Big Match Series is by Sahan Wijeratne. Sahan Wijeratne representing Cambrians from 2000 to 2003 scored 441 runs including two centuries and two half-centuries with his series aggregate of 73.5. He is the first centurion of the Limited Over Match with a score of 116 runs in 2003.

During their history, both schools have produced prominent cricketers to the national stream. Beginning from Anton Sethupathy, Duleep Mendis, Prasanna Jayawardene, Amal Silva, Somachandra de Silva, Dr. O.L.F. Senaratne, H.I. Femando, Nisal Senaratne, Stanley de Alwis, Lasantha Rodrigo, Anura Polonowita, D.S. de Silva, Sarath Fernando, Lantra Fernando, Granville de Silva, Chaminda Mendis, Romesh Kaluwitharana, Amila Aponso, Shehan Jayasuriya, Oshada Fernando, Vishwa Fernando, Avishka Fernando, Praveen Jayawickrama to Lahiru Thirimanne and Kusal Mendis.

== Atmosphere ==
The "Battle of the Golds" is filled with pageantry. With decorated tents, flags and baila singing and dancing groups present all around the Moratuwa city and the ground itself during the match days and in the days leading up to it. The 3-day match is held on Friday, Saturday and Sunday. The 1-day limited over match is held on Saturday and Twenty20 match is held on Sunday of the following week. By tradition, the schools are closed on match days to allow students to attend the Big Match. Souvenirs published by the both schools. Before the match, the students of each school take a motorcade (well known as "The Truck Parade") with bands and decorations and other colorful items showing support for their team. Overloaded cars with supporters singing and careering along the streets is a familiar sight during match days.

The match is attended by a variety of people, including many with no direct connection to either school, and features a celebratory atmosphere. It is normal to see elderly alumni the schools coming to the "Big Match" to relive old times and reunite with old friends.

== Past Results ==
=== 3-Day Matches ===
1. PWC (7.89%)
2. SSC (5.26%)
3. Drawn (85.5%)
4. No-result (1.32%)

Results of the 3-day matches (Previously 2-day)

- Matches Played – 76
- Matches Drawn – 65
- Matches Won by Prince of Wales' College – 06
- Matches Won by St. Sebastian's College – 04
- Matches with no-result – 01

==== Records ====
Prince of Wales' College

- Highest Score: 179 (not out) by Nilantha Bopage in 1991
- Best Bowling: 7 for 33 by Suranga Wijenayake in 1995
- Highest Total: 415/9 in 1958
- Lowest Total: 67 in 1984
- Highest Partnership: 247 by WG Fernando and Sunil de Silva in 1960

St. Sebastian's College:

- Highest Score: 148 by Gerald Mendis in 1966
- Best Bowling: 8 for 53 by Anuk de Alwis in 2009
- Highest Total: 363/3 in 2011
- Lowest Total: 36 in 1937
- Highest Partnership: 219 runs by Jude Fernando and Prasanna Fernando in 1978

==== Result Table ====
Year	PWC		SSC		Result	Ref.
Year	1st Ings	2nd Ings	1st Ings	2nd Ings	Result	Ref.
1933	+145	98/7	88	43/8	Drawn	
1934	+269	-	71	45/2	Drawn	
1935	114	102/6	+127	88	Won by Prince of Wales' College	
1936	+105	237	140	159	Won by Prince of Wales' College	
1937	292	-	+169	36	Won by Prince of Wales' College	
1938–1953 not played
1954	+242	184/2	365/7	16/2	Drawn	
1955	274	56/1	+139	190	Won by Prince of Wales' College	
1956	+213/3	115/3	180/9	117/6	Drawn	
1957	245	56/4	+140	233/6	Drawn	
1958	415/9	-	+319	69/4	Drawn	
1959	+263	-	119	88	Won by Prince of Wales' College	
1960	+325/1	-	113	182/5	Drawn	
1961	199	72/3	+178	155/9	Drawn	
1962	+170	161	174	159/5	Won by St. Sebastian's College	
1963	303/8	-	+176	139/6	Drawn	
1964	+176	160/7	195	50/7	Drawn	
1965	208	160/6	186	138/5	Drawn	
1966	76	93	+321/7	-	Won by St. Sebastian's College	
1967	+259/6	111/5	215	-	Drawn	
1968	+285	-	143	280/8	Drawn	
1969–1970 not played
1971	+200/7	69	180/5	17/4	Drawn	
1972	152	61/2	+124	197/4	Drawn	
1973	151	29/0	+206/8	111/5	Drawn	
1974	+124	295/7	215/8	-	Drawn	
1975	+199/6	85/9	171/3	27/4	Drawn	
1976	+169	140/7	150/7	64/2	Drawn	
1977	117/9	41/2	+86	70	Won by Prince of Wales' College	
1978	191	27/5	+264/5	102/4	Drawn	
1979	+154	153/6	184/7	49/2	Drawn	
1980	+114	192	165/8	60/3	Drawn	
1981	+181/8	106/8	158	52/2	Drawn	
1982	+192/9	105/6	192/7	-	Drawn	
1983	+161	141/6	196/5	-	Drawn	
1984	+163	67	144/7	55/7	Drawn	
1985	+137	57/4	192/8	-	Drawn	
1986	127/5	60/4	+188/6	73/4	Drawn	
1987	+165/9	162/8	148/8	87/1	Drawn	
1988	+186/8	77/4	105/9	60/4	Drawn	
1989	159	54/3	+208/2	85/4	Drawn	
1990	+191/7	102/1	131/8	78/1	Drawn	
1991	351/5	-	+174/6	-	Drawn	
1992	213/9	-	287/9	-	Drawn	
1993	262/9	-	+187/8	106/5	Drawn	
1994	+120	113/9	184	-	Drawn	
1995	+175	97/7	144	18/0	Drawn	
1996	+91	116/8	154/9	-	Drawn	
1997	+197/8	131/4	325/4	-	Drawn	
1998	172/5	-	285/9	-	Drawn	
1999	246	-	+219	123/2	Drawn	
2000	166/7	-	+162	119/8	Drawn	
2001	191/5	161/4	255/8	-	Drawn	
2002	232/9	211/7	255/9	-	Drawn	
2003	+200/9	25/1	271/7	-	Drawn	
2004	173	121	+120	87/7	Drawn	
2005	111	31/2	+158	94/7	Drawn	
2006	+179	135/3	271/8	-	Drawn	
2007	+192	177/9	198	71/2	Drawn	
2008	+257/6	-	153	-	Drawn	
2009	+209	120/8	161	44/2	Drawn	
2010	+185	157	167/6	23/2	Drawn	
2011	+201	176	363/3	17/0	Won by St. Sebastian's College	
2012	+161	160/8	252/8	-	Drawn	
2013	+162	135/5	180	-	Drawn	
2014	221/9	32/2	220	221	Drawn	
2015	262/7	-	33/1	-	Drawn	
2016	141	148/4	188	182/6	Drawn	
2017	+230	41/1	221	-	Drawn	
2018	227/7	-	+159	153/6	Drawn	
2019	+194	51/3	220/8 d	-	Drawn	
2020	considered as a no-result					
2021 (Note: Match was played on 14th and 15th of January 2022)	174	17/0	+254	167/2 d	Drawn	
2022	+149	186/9 d	158/8 d	103/2	Drawn	
2023	208	-	+219/7	207/2	Drawn	
2024	+219	164	288/8 d	91/6	Won by St. Sebastian's College	
2025	+161	157/6	208	-	Drawn	
2026	263	54/5	+214	279/4 d	Drawn	
+ Batted First d - declared

=== 1-Day Limited Over Matches ===
1. SSC (51.2%)
2. PWC (39.0%)
3. No Decision (4.88%)
4. Tied (2.44%)
5. No-result (2.44%)

Results of the 1-day limited over matches

- Matches Played – 41
- Matches Won by St. Sebastian's College – 21
- Matches Won by Prince of Wales' College – 16
- Matches with No Decision – 02
- Matches Tied – 01
- Matches with no-result – 01

==== Records ====
Prince of Wales' College

- Highest Total: 336/7 in 2023
- Lowest Total: 62 in 1982
- Highest Partnership: 197 runs by Tharindu Amarasinghe and Rivith Jayasuriya in 2023

St. Sebastian's College:

- Highest Total: 295/4 in 2023
- Lowest Total: 90 in 2001
- Highest Partnership: 149 runs by Adesh Almeida and Vimath Dinsara in 2023

==== Result Table ====
Year	PWC	SSC	Result	Ref.
1981	150/5	+148	Prince of Wales' College won by 5 wickets	
1982	+62	63/5	St. Sebastian's College won by 5 wickets	
1983–1987 not played
1988	+101	102/6	St. Sebastian's College won by 4 wickets	
1989	+193/9	194/9	St. Sebastian's College won by 1 wicket	
1990	48/2	+164/8	No Decision	
1991	+201/8	180	Prince of Wales' College won by 21 runs	
1992	163/2	+162	Prince of Wales' College won by 8 wickets	
1993	144/6	+143/9	Prince of Wales' College won by 4 wickets	
1994	142/8	+197	St. Sebastian's College won by 55 runs	
1995	144/5	+143	Prince of Wales' College won by 5 wickets	
1996	116	+163/9	St. Sebastian's College won by 47 runs	
1997	158	+250/9	St. Sebastian's College won by 92 runs	
1998	156/8	+192/9	St. Sebastian's College won by 36 runs	
1999	+227/8	206	Prince of Wales' College won by 21 runs	
2000	+85	86/4	St. Sebastian's College won by 6 wickets	
2001	92/5	+90	Prince of Wales' College won by 5 wickets	
2002	+220	225/8	St. Sebastian's College won by 2 wickets	
2003	+124	127/5	St. Sebastian's College won by 5 wickets	
2004	+205	125	Prince of Wales' College won by 80 runs	
2005	163	+176/9	St. Sebastian's College won by 13 runs	
2006	151/5	+149	Prince of Wales' College won by 5 wickets	
2007	181/8	+179	Prince of Wales' College won by 2 wickets	
2008	DNP	143	No Decision	
2009	+282/9	134	Prince of Wales' College won by 148 runs	
2010	159/9	+158/8	Prince of Wales' College won by 1 wicket	
2011	+287/9	288/4	St. Sebastian's College won by 6 wickets	
2012	220	+275/8	St. Sebastian's College won by 55 runs	
2013	91/4	+89	Prince of Wales' College won by 6 wickets	
2014	182	182/7	Tied	
2015	148	+225/9	St. Sebastian's College won by 77 runs	
2016	+171	172/5	St. Sebastian's College won by 5 wickets	
2017	+159	154/4	St. Sebastian's College won by 6 runs on D/L method	
2018	+163/9	166/4	St. Sebastian's College won by 6 wickets	
2019	169/6	+218/9	Prince of Wales' College won by 5 runs on D/L method	
2020	considered as a no-result			
2021 (Note: Match was played on 16th of January 2022)	+134	132	Prince of Wales' College won by 2 runs	
2022	211	+227/9	St. Sebastian's College won by 16 runs	
2023	+336/7	295/4	St. Sebastian's College won by 6 wickets on D/L method	
2024	245	+265	St. Sebastian's College won by 20 runs	
2025	+224/7	119	Prince of Wales' College won by 105 runs	
2026	+116	112/2	St. Sebastian's College won by 8 wickets on D/L method	
+ Batted First; DNP - Did Not Play

=== T20 Matches ===
Results of the T20 matches

- Matches Played – 04
- Matches Won by St. Sebastian's College – 04
- Matches Won by Prince of Wales' College – 00

==== Result Table ====
Year	PWC	SSC	Result	Ref.
2023	+162/7	163/5	St. Sebastian's College won by 5 wickets	
2024	+161/9	164/7	St .Sebastian's College won by 3 wickets	
2025	82/7	+171/7	St .Sebastian's College won by 89 runs	
2026	85	+145/9	St .Sebastian's College won by 60 runs	
+ Batted First

== Captains of Series ==
Year	Prince of Wales'	St. Sebastian's
1933	Duncan Fernando	Eugene De Silva
1934	Ernest F. De Mel	Eugene De Silva
1935	Ernest F. De Mel	Earl Wijesinghe
1936	K.M.Jayasekera	K.A.S. Perera
1937	K.M.Jayasekera	K.A.S. Perera
1938–1953 not played
1954	Herbert Fonseka	Raymond De Silva
1955	Stanley De Alwis	Raymond De Silva
1956	Lasantha Rodrigo	Joy Abeyratne
1957	Lasantha Rodrigo	Kingsley Fernando
1958	Lakdasa Gunathilake	Sirimal Fernando
1959	Suranjith Mendis	Kingsley Fernando
1960	W.G. Fernando	Kingsley Fernando
1961	Lister Perera	Firmin Fernando
1962	Hyasti Aponoso	Priyantha Fernando
1963	Vernon De Mel	Ian Barthelot
1964	Priyananda Perera	Sumithra Fernando
1965	Nihal Sannasgala	Frank Cooray
1966	Leslie De Silva	Sarath Perera
1967	Lioyd Patemott	Maxwell De Silva
1968	Ray Fernando	Marian Cooray
1969–1970 not played
1971	Priyantha Jayasekera	Ralph Gunawardene
1972	Shriyan Samararatne	Crisanthus Fernando
1973	Bandula De Silva	Sunil Wickramanayake
1974	Hemal Mendis	Susil Fernando
1975	Lantra Fernando	Milroy Paul
1976	Wirantha Fernando	Rodney Perera
1977	Pemlal Fernando	Walter Fernando
1978	Jayanath Perera	Luxsen Fernando
1979	Suresh de Silva	Roger Wijesuriya
1980	Sandun Keerthichandra	Prasanna Fernando
1981	Ajith Bandara	Glenmo Perera
1982	Saman De Silva	Manaram De Mel
1983	Sumedha Gamlath	Rupanath Wickramaratne
1984	Lalith Weerasinghe	Chrysanth Swaris
1985	Vikum Halwature	Indrajith Mendis
1986	Nimal Kariyawasam	Lakdeva Perera
1987	Shamal De Silva	Anusha Silva
1988	Ruwan Weerawardena	Romesh Kaluwitharana
1989	Janitha Silva	Nishantha Fernando
1990	Chammika De Silva	Harsnana Karunaratne
1991	Pramuk De Silva	Primal Salgado
1992	Vishvanath Fernando	Kumudu Anton
1993	Suranga Wellalage	Dinesh Samarasinghe
1994	Nalin Krishantha	Sanjeva Silva
1995	Sriyantha De Mel	Sharon Frank Martin
1996	Surange Wijenayake	Mario Rees
1997	Chanmila Galketiya	Nimesh Perera
1998	Sanieewa Pieris	Buddhika Mendis
1999	Hasantha Fernando	Nuwan Fernando
2000	Pubudu Ranaweera	Malshan Fernando
2001	Manjala Bandara	Premesh Perera
2002	Sahan Wijeratne	Sumalka Perera
2003	Shanaka Perumpulli	Manjula Silva
2004	Kavinda Silva	Dunil Abeydeera
2005	Nalin Prabodha	Dilhan Cooray
2006	Isuru Gunasena	Jehan Fernando
2007	Pishan Hewage	Sachintha Cooray
2008	Sashan Silva	Janitha Jayawardena
2009	Buddhika Alwis	Prageeth Perera
2010	Nuwantha Peiris	Aanuk De Alwis
2011	Isuru Thilina	Sanitha De Mel
2012	Tharindu Dilshan	Amila Aponso
2013	Kusal Mendis	Anushka Perera
2014	Ashen Mendis	Anuk Fernando
2015	Jayanga Peiris	Visal Senanayake
2016	Thilan Nimesh	Avishka Fernando
2017	Vishwa Chathuranga	Mishane Silva
2018	Savindu Peiris	Tharusha Fernando
2019	Suwath Mendis	Nuwanidu Fernando
2020	Naduka Fernando	Janishka Perera
2021	Dinura Fernando	Sukitha Prasanna
2022	Tharindu Gimantha Amarasinghe	Bihanga Mendis
2023	Omesh Mendis	Sandesh Fernando
2024	Achala Perera	Manuj Chanthuka
2025	Rivith Jayasuriya	Ryan Dissanayake
2026	Suwahas Fernando	Adesh Almeida

== Batting and Bowling Records ==
=== Prince of Wales' College Team ===
Batting and bowling records by Prince of Wales' College team's players in 3-day (Previously 2-day) matches.

==== Batting ====
===== Centuries =====
Jagath de Soysa is the first centurion for Cambrians in the big match series.

Year	Player	Score
1955	Jagath de Soysa	105
1958	Suranjith Mendis	105
1958	Lasantha Rodrigo	119
1960	W. G. Fernando	132*
1960	Sunil De Silva	132*
1963	Raja Peiris	140
1971	Priyantha Jayasekera	100
1974	Hemal Mendis	143
1978	Wirantha Fernando	113
1990	Sanjeewa Fernando	100
1991	Nilantha Bopage	179*^{a}
1993	Nalin Krishantha	109
2001	Sahan Wijeratne	100
2002	Sahan Wijerathne	103
2008	Lahiru Thirimanne	100*
2015	Hasitha Lanka	110
2015	Jayanga Peiris	102
* Not Out^{a} Highest Score in the series

===== Scores of Fifty & Over =====
Year	Player	Score
1993	K. M. Jayasekera	58
1934	L. B. A. de Silva	94
1937	C. Samaranayake	88
1954	Lasantha Rodrigo	95
1954	Jagath de Soysa	96
1955	Herbert Fonseka	57
1956	Herbert Fonseka	83*
1956	Lasantha Rodrigo	67
1958	E. W. Perera	54*
1959	Suranjith Mendis	63
1959	Lakdasa Gunathilake	55
1961	D. S. De Silva	56
1962	Hemal Mendis Sr.	70
1962	Hayasti Aponso	80
1964	Sarath Fernando	59
1964	S. de Siiva	59
1965	S. Silva	50
1967	Ray Fernando	51*
1967	Omar Jayasekera	58
1968	Ray Fernando	69
1972	Hemal Mendis	73
1974	Jayantha Perera	56
1975	Srinath Cooray	60*
1976	Wirantha Fernando	63*
1976	Shiran Ferdinando	50
1980	Sandun Keenhichandra	54
1981	Chrishan Fernando	51
1981	Asiri de Silva	59
1981	Ajith Bandara	51
1982	Sudarman Silva	54
1987	Chaminda Mendis	62
1988	Lakmal Dharmasiri	62
1989	Asoka Perera	51
1990	Janitha Silva	68*
1991	S. Fernando	52
1991	S. de Mel	50
1992	Royce Fernando	53
1992	Suranga Wellalage	53
1998	Hasantha Fernando	54
1999	Hasantha Fernando	67
1999	Janaka Gunaratne	55
2000	Pubudu Ranaweera	51
2001	Sahan Wijerathne	51*
2001	Sahan Galappaththi	51
2002	Sahan Wijerathne	97
2002	Amila Athukorale	50*
2002	Buddhika Dananjaya	66
2006	Lahiru Thirimanne	57
2006	Shashan Silva	81
2007	Pishan Hewage	87
2008	Isuru Thilina	51
2010	Buddikka De Alwis	66*
2010	Nipun Peiris	54
2011	Shehan Jayasuriya	82
2011	Shehan Jayasuriya	79
2012	Shanuka Dulaj	71
2014	Kusal Mendis	89
2016	Vishwa Chathuranga	65
2017	Vishwa Chathuranga	88
2023	Tharindu Amarasinghe	73
2023	Omesh Mendis	65
2024	Pasan Cooray	58
2024	Suwahas Fernando	52
2025	Rivith Jayasooriya	50
2025	Oshan Maneesha	56
2026	Suwahas Fernando	77
* Not Out

==== Bowling ====
Suranga Wijenayake is the highest wicket-taker for Prince of Wales' College in single inning. He took 7 wickets for 33 runs in 1995.

===== Four Wickets & Over in an Inning =====
Year	Player	Wickets
1933	Eric de Silva	4 for 19
1935	E. F. de Mel	4 for 34
1937	Lioyd Peiris	5 for 57 & 4 for 19
1955	Stanley de Alwis	5 for 56
1957	Lasantha Rodrigo	4 for 23
1958	W. G. Fernando	5 for 66
1961	Lister Perera	4 for 37
1962	Vernon de Mel	4 for 41
1964	Sarath Fernando	6 for 42 & 4 for 22
1968	Ajith Mendis	4 for 18 & 4 for 75
1980	Chrishan Fernando	4 for 43
1982	A. de Silva	4 for 50
1984	Nalaka Wijiesuriya	4 for 15
1984	Thilak de Silva	4 for 65
1985	Lalith Weerasinghe	4 for 45
1988	Shamal de Silva	4 for 22
1990	Sanjaya Silva	5 for 09
1994	Suranga Wijenayaka	4 for 47
1994	Senaka de Silva	5 for 34
1995	Suranga Wijenayake	7 for 33
1996	lndika Pathirana	4 for 19
1996	Suranga Wijenayake	4 for 49
1998	Kelum Fernando	4 for 94
2000	Pubudu Flanaweera	4 for 32
2001	Sumanjan Rajitha	4 for 43
2004	Dilshan Sampath	4 for 26
2004	Nisal Vithanage	5 for 29
2006	Isuru Gunasena	4 for 83
2013	Thilan Nimesh	4 for 49
2014	Thilan Nimesh	4 for 41 & 4 for 91
2017	Kaumal Nanayakkara	5 for 46

=== St. Sebastian's College Team ===
Batting and bowling records by St. Sebastian's College team's players in 3-day (Previously 2-day) matches.

==== Batting ====
The highest individual total by a Sebastian came in 1966 off the bat of Gerald Mendis as the batsman notched up 148.

===== Centuries =====
Year	Player	Score
1954	Philip Cooray	1954
1966	Gerald Mendis	148
2011	Oshade Fernando	129*
2023	Sanesh Fernando	114*
2023	Vimath Dinsara	101*
* Not Out

===== Scores of Fifty & Over =====
Year	Player	Score
2007	Randika Fernando	50
2008	Trevin Fernando	56
2010	Sanitha De Mel	51
2011	Luke Jayadeva	50
2011	Deshan Dias	60
2012	Anuk Fernando	80*
2016	Avishka Fernando	70
2016	Mishen Silva	63
2017	Mishen Silva	77
2023	Adesh Ameida	79
2024	Adesh Almeida	59
2024	Tharindu Dilanka	59
2024	Vimath Dinsara	51
2025	Lashen Fernando	50
2026	Chamath Wellalage	58 & 50*
2026	Thiwanka Fernando	50
2026	Kaveesha Perera	52
2026	Lashen Fernando	54
2026	Koshendra Fernando	66*
* Not Out

==== Bowling ====
Anuk De Alwis is the highest wicket-taker for St. Sebastian's College in single inning. He took 8 wickets for 53 runs in 1995.

===== Four Wickets & Over in an Inning =====
Year	Player	Wickets
2009	Anuk De Alwis	8 for 53
2011	Sanitha De Mel	5 for 55
2012	Amila Aponso	6 for 54
2013	Anuk Fernando	4 for 38
2014	Lahiru Heshan	4 for 48
2017	Praveen Jayawickrama	5 for 62
2023	Sandesh Fernando	6 for 67
2024	Manuja Chanthuka	6 for 73

=== Best Partnership Records in 1-Day Limited Over Matches ===
Wicket	Team	Runs	Partners	Ref.
1st	PWC	197 runs	Tharindu Amarasinghe and Rivith Jayasuriya in 2023	
2nd	SSC	149 runs	Adesh Almeida and Vimath Dinsara in 2023	
3rd	PWC	103 runs	Lahiru Thirimanne 51 and Sanka Peiris 55 in 2006	
4th	SSC	63 runs	Lasith Fernando 36 and Sumalka Perera 26 in 2002	
5th	SSC	110 runs	Nalin Wijesinghe 50 and Manjula Fernando 59 in 1998	
6th	PWC	61 runs	Vajirapani Jayakulasooriya 33 and Priyantha Mendis 29 in 1992	
8th	SSC	72 runs	Primal Salgado 55* and Manoj Perera 32 in 1989	
9th	SSC	58 runs	Nuwan Perera 56* and Buddhika Amarasinghe 21* in 2002	
* Not Out; PWC – Prince of Wales' College; SSC – St. Sebastian's College

== Cricket Coaches ==
=== Prince of Wales' College ===
List of Prince of Wales' College cricket coaches from 1876 to date

- J.C. Mckeyzer
- Claude Orr
- A. Vandergert
- E. Weerasooriya
- C.V. Samarasinghe
- C. Manakularathne
- N.D.De.S. Wijesekara
- Condrad Rodrigo
- Nisal Senarathne
- H.I. Fernando
- P.H.S. Mendis
- Harward Fernando
- Vernon Perera
- R.T.N. Fernando
- Sunil de Silva
- Chitral Mendis
- Bandula De Silva
- Jayantha Perera
- Lantra Fernando
- Kushan Jayawikrama
- Kelum Fernando
- Dilshan Mendis
- Pemlal Fernando

=== St. Sebastian's College ===
- Sanjeewa Silva
- Neil Rajapakse
- Heshan de Mel
- Imal Botheju
- Nalin Wijesinghe
- Bradman Ediriweera
- Pasan Wanasinghe

== Challenge Trophies ==
Trophy	Donor
Best Cambrian All-rounder	Mr. S. Rathandasa
Best Cambrian Batsman	Vinchandra Industries
Best Cambrian Bowler	Vinchandra Industries
Most Outstanding Cambrian Cricket	Mr. Balleth Matthes
Man of the Match	Mr. Lolyd De Mel
Highest Scorer	Mr. Tyronne Fernando P.C.M.P.
Best Batsman	Leo Club of Moratuwa
J.B.C. Rodirgo Memorial Shield	Dr. & Mrs. Festus Fernando
Thilak Fernando Memorial Shield for the man of the match Cambrian Side	Mr. Thilak Fernando's Friends
Thilak Fernando Memorial Shield for the Best Cambrian Batsman	Mr. Thilak Fernando's Friends
Annual Prize for the Best Cambrian All-rounder	Dr. G.N. Perera
L.t.Col.Srimal Mendis Memorial Trophy for the Best Cambrian All-rounder	Nilesh Perera, His brothers in Canada & Friends
Cambrian who gets most number of boundaries in the limited over match	City Furnishers, Moratuwa in memory of beloved Teacher Miss Lynette Salgado
Challenge Cup for Best Cambrian All-rounder	Mr. Edmund Fernando
Lloyd H. Peiris memorial prize for Man of the match Cambrian Side	Mr. Lloyd H. Peiris's family members
Best Cambrian All-rounder in the limited over match	Mr. Balleth Matthes
Best Cambrian All-rounder	Mrs. Manel Fernando and son in memory of Sarath Fernando
Best Bowler of the match	Mr. Sweeny T. Fernando
Best Cambrian Fielder	Young Cambrian Sports Club in memory of Sumith Fernando
Jayantha Perera Memorial Challenge Trophy for the Best Fielder	Cambrians 65/66 Group of Old Boys

== Family Members Who Played In The Series ==
=== Brothers In The Series ===
==== Prince of Wales' College ====
Brothers who played for the Prince of Wales' College team between 1933 and 2023

- K.P. Jayasekera
  K.M. Jayasekera
- Terence Peiris
  Lloyed Peiris
- Lasantha Rodrigo
  Ranjan Rodrigo
- Gamini Silva
  Sudharman Silva
- Pemlal Fernando
  Shantilal Fernando
- Yasendra De Silva
  Sarath De Silva
  Manjusiri De Silva
  Bandula De Silva
- Brindley Perera
  Everie Perera
- Sarath Fernando
  Nilmal Fernando
- Ray Fernando
  Vere Fernando
- Omar Jayasekera
  Priyantha Jayasekera
- Shriyan Samararatna
  Savindra Samararatna
- Nimal Cooray
  Lakdasa Cooray
  Srinath Cooray
  Mahes Cooray
- Chitral Mendis
  Hemal Mendis
- Lalin Bharethi
  Laksiri Bharethi
- Shiran Ferdinando
  Shalin Ferdinando
- Suranjith Mendis
  Hemal Mendis Snr.
  Ajith Mendis
- Anura Jayakody
  Rohana Jayakody
- Ravi Ratnapala
  Eraj Ratnapala
- Priyantha Wijesuriya
  Nalaka Wijesuriya
- Kusal Mendis
  Omesh Mendis

==== Special Appearances ====
In 2026, for the first time, twin brothers represented two opposing teams in the match, Shehan Ashen playing for Prince of Wales’ College and Shenas Hashein playing for St. Sebastian’s College.

=== Fathers & Sons In The Series ===
==== Prince of Wales' College ====
Fathers & Sons who played for the Prince of Wales' College team between 1933 and 2006

- G.P. De Silva
  Sunil De Silva
- Leslie De Silva
  Lakshantha De Silva
- H.F.F. Senaratne
  Nisal Senaratne

== Venues ==
- De Soysa Stadium, Moratuwa (formerly known as Tyronne Fernando Stadium)
- Singhalese Sports Club Cricket Ground, Cinnamon Gardens, Colombo
- R. Premadasa Stadium, Colombo
- P. Sara Oval Stadium, Borella, Colombo
