= Swithin Fernando =

The Right Reverend Swithin Fernando
- Bishop of Colombo
- Church: Anglican Church of Ceylon
- See: Anglican Diocese of Colombo
- In office: 1978–1987
- Predecessor: Cyril Abeynaike
- Successor: Jabez Jabasir Gnanapragasam

Orders
- Ordination: 1944

Swithin Winston Fernando was an Anglican Bishop of Colombo in Sri Lanka.

An alumnus of Prince of Wales' College, Moratuwa he was the Archdeacon of Colombo in 1971 and consecrated Bishop of Colombo in January 1978. An incumbent of All Saints' Church, Galle and St. Luke's Church Borella, he died on 5 December 2009 and a memorial service to honour his life of service to the Anglican Communion was held the following year in February.

== See also ==
- Church of Ceylon
- Anglican Bishop of Colombo
- Anglican Diocese of Colombo

Anglican Communion titles
Preceded by Cyril Abeynaike	Bishop of Colombo; 1978 – 1987	Succeeded by Jabez Jabasir Gnanapragasam
