= Jabez Gnanapragasam =

Right Reverend Jabez Jebasir Gnanapragasam
- Bishop of Colombo
- Church: Anglican Church of Ceylon
- See: Anglican Diocese of Colombo
- In office: 1987–1992
- Predecessor: Swithin Winston Fernando
- Successor: Kenneth Michael James Fernando
- Previous posts: Archdeacon of Jaffna (1969-1978); Archdeacon of Colombo (1978-1987)

Personal details
- Born: 30 July 1924 Colombo, Sri Lanka
- Died: 1 November 1997 (aged 73) Nugegoda, Sri Lanka
- Spouse: Grace (m. 1953)
- Children: 1

Jabez Jebasir Gnanapragasam (30 July 1924 – 1 November 1997) was the 12th Anglican Bishop of Colombo, Sri Lanka. He was educated at Trinity College, Kandy, read History at University of Ceylon and Theology at Bishop's College, Calcutta. He was married to Grace (24 February 1934 – 2 October 2019) from 1953 until his death in November 1997. His brother, Emmanuel was also an Anglican priest.

== See also ==
- Church of Ceylon
- Anglican Bishop of Colombo
- Anglican Diocese of Colombo

Religious titles
Preceded by Swithin Winston Fernando	Bishop of Colombo; 1987–1992	Succeeded by Kenneth Michael James Fernando
