= Kenneth Fernando =

Sri Lankan Anglican bishop (1932–2025)

Right Reverend Kenneth Fernando
- Bishop of Colombo
- Church: Anglican Church of Ceylon
- See: Anglican Diocese of Colombo
- In office: 1992 — 2001
- Predecessor: Jabez Jabasir Gnanapragasam
- Successor: Duleep Kamil de Chickera
- Previous post(s): Director, Ecumenical Institute for Study and Dialogue

Orders
- Consecration: 1992

Personal details
- Born: 25 July 1932; Ceylon
- Died: 3 September 2025 (aged 93)

Kenneth Michael James Fernando (25 July 1932 – 3 September 2025) was a Sri Lankan Anglican clergyman who was Bishop of Colombo.

Born in Moratuwa and educated at Prince of Wales' College, Moratuwa and Royal College, Colombo and at the University of Oxford, he served as the Secretary of the Diocese before he was elected as the Bishop of Colombo. He served as the Vicar of Maharagama Anglican Church prior to his ordination. Fernando died on 3 September 2025, at the age of 93.

== See also ==
- Church of Ceylon
- Anglican Bishop of Colombo
- St Luke's Church, Borella

Religious titles
Preceded by Cyril Lindon Abeynaike	Bishop of Colombo; 1992 – 2001	Succeeded by Duleep De Chickera
