= Diocese of Colombo =

Diocese of Colombo may refer to:

- Diocese of Colombo (Anglican)
- Roman Catholic Archdiocese of Colombo
