= Cyril Abeynaike =

Sri Lankan Anglican bishop

Right Reverend Cyril Abeynaike
- Bishop of Colombo
- Church: Anglican Church of Ceylon
- See: Anglican Diocese of Colombo
- In office: 1971–1977
- Predecessor: Charles Harold Wilfred de Soysa
- Successor: Swithin Winston Fernando
- Previous post: Archdeacon of Colombo

Personal details
- Born: 22 February 1911 Ceylon
- Died: 8 May 1981 (aged 70) Colombo, Sri Lanka

Cyril Leander Abeynaike (22 February 1911 – 8 May 1991) was a former Anglican Bishop of Colombo, Sri Lanka.

Educated at Royal College, Colombo he went on to study history at the University College, Colombo and theology at the King's College, London. He was made the Archdeacon of Colombo before he was elected as the Bishop of Colombo.

== See also ==
- Church of Ceylon
- Anglican Bishop of Colombo
- Anglican Diocese of Colombo
- St. Luke's Church Borella

Religious titles
Preceded by Charles Harold Wilfred de Soysa	Bishop of Colombo; 1971–1977	Succeeded by Swithin Winston Fernando
