= Piers Claughton =

British bishop and author (1814–1884)

Piers Calveley Claughton (8 June 1814 – 11 August 1884) was an Anglican colonial bishop and author.

== Early life ==
The son of Thomas Claughton (M.P. for Newton, Lancashire, 1818 – 25) of Haydock Lodge, he was educated at Brasenose College, Oxford, where he graduated, B.A. (1835) and M.A. (1838). He was elected a Fellow of University College, Oxford in 1836.

== Ordination and advancement ==
Following his ordination in 1838 he was made rector of Elton, Huntingdonshire (1842 – 43; 1845 – 59), before becoming the first Bishop of St Helena (1859 – 61) and a subsequent translation to the Bishop of Colombo (1862 – 71). Upon his return to England he served as Archdeacon of London and a canon of St Paul's from 1870 to 1884 and was appointed Chaplain-General of Her Majesty's Forces in 1875.

== Death ==
He died in Maida Vale, London. A memorial tablet was placed in the crypt of St. Paul's Cathedral, London in 1885. A stamp was issued to commemorate the 150th anniversary of the Diocese of St Helena which bore his image. his brother was Bishop of Rochester from 1867 to 1877; and then of St Albans until 1890.

== Publications ==
Amongst others he wrote:

- Knowledge the Reward of Obedience, 1840
- A Brief Comparison of the Thirty-nine Articles of the Church of England with Holy Scripture, 1843
- A Catechism in Six Parts, for the Sundays in Lent. BiblioBazaar. 1847. ISBN 9781149742983.
- The Gospel Invitation, 1859
- The Jews in relation to the Church and the World, 1877
- The Manner of the Growth of Christ's Kingdom, 1877

== Notes and references ==
- Muss-Arnolt, William; Benton, Josiah Henry (1914). "CHAPTER XXXV THE SINHALESE PRAYER BOOK". The Book of Common Prayer Among the Nations of the World: A History of Translations of the Prayer Book of the Church of England and of the Protestant Episcopal Church of America; a Study, Based Mainly, on the Collection of Josiah Henry Benton. S.P.C.K.
- Colonies And India Newspaper Archive: 24 October 1884 - Page 12
- Lane, John Henry (1914). Newton in Makerfield: Its History, with some account of its people. Compiled from Authentic sources. John Henry Lane. Archived from the original on 9 July 2011.
- Claughton, Piers Calverley (1872). "Last Days in Ceylon". Mission Life. Vol. III. pp. 67–72 – via Project Canterbury.
- Fisher, D. R. (2009). The House of Commons, 1820-1832 7 Volume Set. Cambridge University Press. ISBN 978-0-521-19314-6.
- Sutton, Charles William (1887). "Claughton, Piers Calverley". In Stephen, Leslie (ed.). Dictionary of National Biography. Vol. 11. London: Smith, Elder & Co.
- Foster, Joseph (1888). Alumni Oxonienses: The Members of the University of Oxford, 1715-1886; Their Parentage, Birthplace and Year of Birth, with a Record of Their Degrees. Vol. I (A-D). Oxford: Parker.
- Page, William (1936). "Parishes: Elton". In Proby, Granville; Ladds, S. Inskip (eds.). A History of the County of Huntingdon. Vol. 3. Institute of Historical Research.
- Weirter, L. (1909). Memorials of St Paul's Cathedral. London: William Macdonald Sinclair.

Anglican Church of Southern Africa titles
New diocese	Bishop of St Helena; 1859 – 1862	Succeeded by Thomas Earle Welby
Anglican Communion titles
Preceded by James Chapman	Bishop of Colombo; 1862 – 1871	Succeeded by Hugh Willoughby Jermyn
Church of England titles
Preceded by William Hale Hale	Archdeacon of London; 1871 – 1884	Succeeded by Edwin Hamilton Gifford
Preceded by George Robert Gleig	Chaplain-General to the Forces; 1875 – 1884	Succeeded by John Cox Edghill
