= Prince of Wales' College, Moratuwa =

Prince of Wales' College
- වේල්ස් කුමර විදුහල

Location
- Moratuwa; Sri Lanka; 6.785199°N 79.8827°E

Information
- Type: National
- Motto: Latin: Ich Dien, Nihil per Saltum (I serve, not at a leap)
- Established: 1876; 150 years ago
- Founder: Charles Henry de Soysa
- Principal: Hasitha Kesara Wettimuni
- Staff: 350+
- Grades: Class 1 – 13
- Gender: Boys
- Age: 5 to 19
- Enrollment: 7,500+
- Colors: Purple, gold and maroon
- Publication: Cambrian Magazine
- Alumni: Old Cambrians
- Website: princeofwales.edu.lk

Prince of Wales' College (Sinhala: වේල්ස් කුමර විද්‍යාලය Wales Kumara Vidyalaya, Tamil: பிரின்ஸ் ஆஃப் வேல்ஸ் கல்லூரி) is a selective-entry boys' school in Moratuwa, a suburb of Colombo, Sri Lanka. Prince of Wales College, Moratuwa (along with Princess of Wales' College), was founded and endowed in 1876 by Sir Charles Henry de Soysa, a famous 19th century Sri Lankan philanthropist and was named in honour of Prince Albert, Prince of Wales

The school became a fully government-controlled school in 1962. As of 2016 over 7100 boys are studying in the school in grades 1 to 13 including all main streams of secondary studies which include biology, mathematics, commerce and arts.

The first Minister of Education, Dr. C. W. W. Kannangara and Dr. Tuan Burhanudeen Jayah, a senior minister, have both served on the staff of Prince of Wales College. Sir James Peiris was a former trustee of the college.

Prince of Wales College is known to produce many exceptional cricketers from a long time of which some of them, at one time, have played for the national team. It has won the Herman Loos Cup for cadeting many times in the past and has also won international championships in rowing.

== History ==
=== Founder ===
The founding patron of the school was the philanthropist, Sir Charles Henry de Soysa. Following the arrival of the then Prince of Wales (Edward VII) in Colombo in 1875, he wanted to name the two schools he intended to build – Prince of Wales and Princess of Wales. As a result of a letter sent on 27 November 1875, he received permission to name the two schools the Prince of Wales’ and Princess of Wales’.

14 September 1876 was a memorable day for the Moratuwa community; the school, which was built on a picturesque 15-acre plot of land facing the Galle Road, and bordered by the Lunawa Lagoon, was ceremonially opened. The then governor of Sri Lanka, Sir William Gregory, graced the occasion as the chief guest. The school was designed by Mr Muhandiram Mendis Jayawardena, and about Rs. 300,000/= was spent on its construction. The school buildings were one of the most elegant in the country at that time. The ceremonial opening of the St. John's Church and St. John's College Panadura built by Mudliyar Susew De Soysa were also conducted on the same day.

Sir Charles Henry De Soysa completed five school buildings over an area of five acres and, along with all the necessary equipment, opened the school to the public as a secular institution. He also carefully oversaw the administration, management, and maintenance of the school until his death. In his last will, he requested that his eldest son Mudalier J. W. C. de Soysa take over responsibility for the school, and asked his wife to pay Rs. 3000/= to the school annually, for maintenance work. After Lady Catherine De Soysa died, Sir Charles Henry De Soysa's seven sons took over stewardship of the school. They also obtained their education at Prince of Wales College, and their aid was vital for the school. They endowed the school with two plantations for its maintenance and recruited principals who were Oxbridge graduates.

Mr. W.S. Gunawardena (B.A. Calcutta) was the first principal of the school and served from 1876 until 1891. At first, it was not operated as one school, but as four educational institutes with a total of 1000 students and 40 teachers. They were:

- Prince of Wales’ College
- Princess of Wales’ College
- Prince of Wales’ College (native language)
- Princess of Wales’ College (native language)

The first school prize giving was held in 1883 with Sir John Douglas as the chief guest. There were prize records for all four schools. Prince of Wales’ College and Prince of Wales’ College (native) only had classes up to Grade 7. Prince of Wales’ College was the higher school; it had two divisions named Upper and Lower. Apart from this, there were two classes for undergraduates.

3 March was selected as the Founder's Day. Students attend the service at the Holy Emmanuel church and pay respects to the tomb of Sir Charles Henry de Soysa. Since the 1960s, Buddhist students have commemorated the Founder's Day by engaging in Buddhist rituals.

=== Evolution ===
==== W. S. Gunawardena (first principal 1876–1891) ====
W. S. Gunawardena (B.A. Calcutta) was the first principal and served from 1876 until 1891. The school hostel was started in 1882 and cricket was also introduced to the school during this period.

==== Philip Lewis (principal 1892–1896) ====
Philip Lewis became the second principal and served from 1892 until 1896. Although there were many difficulties, a rapid development of the school could be seen during this period.

==== J. G. C. Mendis (principal 1896–1917) ====
J. G. C. Mendis (B.A. Cambridge), the son-in-law of the founding patron, rendered a valuable service to the school for two decades, from 1896 to 1917. During his tenure a school cricket society was formed and the school ground was further developed. The school magazine: The Cambrian (first issued in 1897), the debating team, cadet corps (1903), library, laboratory, commerce section, tennis and soccer teams, and a children's park were some of the elements added to the school during this era. Another important milestone was the formation of the Old Boys’ Association in 1904. After 21 years of service, Mendis had to retire from his post as principal due to deteriorating health.

==== P. T. Jayasuriya (principal 1917–1925) ====
P. T. Jayasuriya [B.A. Hon.(Lond)] became Mendis' successor as principal. During his time at the school, the academic aspect of the school improved significantly, with students obtaining great results. Under Jayasuriya, the science section and the school cricket ground were developed further and a separate children's park for the school was built. In 1922, The Cambrian was published again and the infrastructure of the school was also enhanced by the addition of three more classrooms. A house system was initiated and four houses were named, after the founder and the first three of the principals: namely, Founder's, Gunawardena, Lewis, and Mendis.

==== L. E. Blaze (principal 1926) ====
In 1926, Louis Edmund Blaze (B.A. Cantab) was appointed principal. He was the founder of Kingswood college, Kandy, a former student of Trinity College, Kandy and the father of school rugby football in Sri Lanka. He was a very dynamic person and the "Golden Jubilee Prize Giving" was held during his period. The English College anthem was also written during this period.

==== L. G. Crease (principal 1927–1931) ====
L. G. Crease (M.A. Oxen) headed the school from 1927 to 1931. He was from Europe and was very strict when it came to student discipline. He was a competent administrator and there was a marked development in cadetting and sports.

==== Rev. F. R. E. Mendis (principal 1931–1932) ====
Rev. F. R. E. Mendis (M.A. Cantab) served as the principal from 1931 to 1932. He started the library fund and developed cricket, soccer, boxing, and athletics.

==== H. Samaranayake (principal 1932–1933) ====
H. Samaranayake (B.A.) who was appointed as the principal in 1932 was the first Buddhist principal.

==== J. B. C. Rodrigo (principal 1933–1959) ====
J. B. C. Rodrigo (M.A. [Oxen] J.P.U.M.), was a very capable administrator and blessed with a great personality. The Teachers’ Guild, Cinema Association, Science Association, Drama Association, Red Cross branch, Sinhala and English Literary Associations, Debating Team, Co-operative Association, and hockey was initiated for the benefit of the students and new classrooms were built.

In 1933, the inaugural Battle of the Golds (Prince of Wales’ College vs. St. Sebastian's College) was held at the school grounds.

==== S. C. H. De Silva (principal 1959–1973) ====
S. C. H. De Silva (B.A., Dip. in School Admst) served the school for 14 years and there was a notable progression in the development of the school. Scouting was introduced and the Buddha shrine was constructed in 1967, ceremonially opened by Governor William Gopallawa. The Sinhala college anthem was written by B. Godahewa in 1967. Tissa Gunawardena joined the staff during this time. His works include the statues of the Buddha, the founding patron, and the largest Sandakadapahana in Sri Lanka. The Art Society and the Drama Club showed remarkable progress under his guidance. Gunawardena presented many stage plays, bringing out students' hidden talents.

==== L. H. Gunapala (principal 1973–1977) ====
L. H. Gunapala, who had served previously as a school inspector and as a district education inspector, was the principal during the school's centennial anniversary. The school was improved to a high standard and Hevisi and Western bands were formed during this time.

==== M. E. C. Fernando (principal 1977–1988) ====
M. E. C. Fernando, a former student and teacher succeeded Gunapala as principal. The H. R. Fernando pavilion was gifted by former student, H. R. Fernando. The cricket score board, library buildings, science and commerce buildings were some of these new additions. The sculpture of Sir Charles Henry de Soysa (sculpted by Tissa Gunawardena) was unveiled during this time. The venue of the annual big match was changed and was arranged to be held at De Soysa Stadium.

==== H. L. B. Gomes (principal 1989–1998) ====
H. L. B. Gomes, who was a former student, a teacher and vice-principal (during M. E. C. Fernando's reign as principal), was appointed as principal in 1989. In his time, the school became one of the 15 National Schools in Sri Lanka. A new auditorium with the latest facilities and a computer department were introduced. Amongst other developments seen at the school during his tenure were making a qualitative improvement in education, expanding the school further by adding more facilities, namely: three, three-storey buildings for Grade 11, the commerce section, and the primary grades; a new auditorium with the latest facilities; the canteens for students and teachers; initiating the construction of a new hostel; construction of the school office, principal's office, meeting hall and, toilets; the introduction of the Media Unit; and the construction of two playgrounds and cricket ground for the primary grades.

In 1998, the Western band of the school had the rare privilege of welcoming the Prince of Wales, Prince Charles, who visited Sri Lanka in order to be part of its 50th Independence Day celebration. The school's cricket programme showed tremendous growth during this period, and this was reflected with captain, Suranga Wijenayake, representing the national team.

==== Recent years ====
The 14th principal, D. A. Ramanayake, improved the computing department. S. J. P. Wijesinghe was the next principal and he was followed by K. Ratnaweera Perera and Rohana Karunaratne correspondingly. After tenures by W. Jayasena, Sampath Weragoda (acting principal) and J. W. S. Siriwardhana respectively. Kusala Fernando was the principal from 2017 to 2021. In 2014 the Jeewan Kumaranatunga allocated funding for the swimming pool project. The swimming pool was opened by the prime minister Ranil Wickremesinghe on 1 August 2017.

== Past principals ==
Many distinguished men have served as the principal of Prince of Wales' College since the inception. Listed below are the names of these principals.

W. S. Gunawardena	1876–1891
Philip Lewis	1892–1896
J. G. C. Mendis	1896–1917
P. T. Jayasuriya	1917–1925
Louis Edmund Blaze	1926
L. G. Crease	1927–1931
F. R. E. Mendis	1931–1932
H. Samaranayake	1932–1933
J. B. C. Rodrigo	1933–1959
S. C. H. De Silva	1959–1973
L. H. Gunapala	1973–1977
M. E. C. Fernando	1977–1988
H. L. B. Gomes	1989–1998
D. A. Ramanayake	1998–2001
S. J. P. Wijesinghe	2001–2005
K. Rathnaweera Perera	2005–2007
Rohana Karunarathna	2007–2011
W. D. Jayasena	2011–2012
Sampath Weragoda	2012–2013
J. W. S. Siriwardane	2013–2016
Kusala Fernando	2017–2021
Dimuthu Deranagoda	2021–2022
Hasitha Kesara Weththimuni	2022–Present

== Houses ==
House	Colours
Founders	Red & Black
Gunawardhane	Gold & Black
Levis	Purpule & Gold
Mendis	Red & Gold
Jayasooriya	Blue & Gold
Rodrigo	Red & Purple

== Old Boys' Association ==
In 1904 when J. G. C. Mendis was the principal, he commenced the Old Boys' Association. By now the membership has risen to around 4,500.

== Sports ==
Cambrians are famous for cricket. When the college was founded the game was introduced in 1876. During this period only the staff members took part. In 1896 organised school cricket was introduced and the first-ever inter-school cricket match was played against Royal College, Colombo. Cambrian cricket players have made significant contributions in all sectors of the sport in Sri Lanka including schools, mercantile clubs, government services, defence services, corporations, and in the field of cricket administration. Some have gained fame and figured prominently as representatives on national and international cricket teams.

Cadeting was introduced to college in 1904. Later athletics and football and, some time later, volleyball was introduced. In 2012, Prince of Wales College made history by winning two gold, four silver, and nine bronze medals at the fourth Asian Schools Rowing Regatta held in Karachi, Pakistan.

=== Annual sports events ===
==== Battle of the Golds ====
Prince of Wales' College plays its annual Big Match with St. Sebastian's College, Moratuwa. It is also known as Battle of the Golds. Cricketers to have captained the school team include Wirantha Fernando and Kusal Mendis.

== Notable alumni ==
Moratuwa|Category:Alumni of Prince of Wales' College, Moratuwa]] for full list

Name	Notability	Reference
Somaweera Chandrasiri	member of parliament Moratuwa (1947–56), Kesbewa (1960–71)	
Philip Gunawardena	member of parliament Avissawella (1947–48, 1956–1970), co-founder of the Lanka Sama Samaja Party	
Sam Peter Christopher Fernando	member of Senate of Ceylon (1960–65)	
Meryl Fernando	member of parliament Moratuwa (1956–60, 1960–65)	
A. J. R. de Soysa	member of Legislative Council of Ceylon (1911–31)	
Vernon Mendis	Sri Lankan High Commissioner to the United Kingdom (1975–77), Sri Lankan High Commissioner to Canada (1977–80)	
Nirmal Ranjith Dewasiri	Head of the department of history University of Colombo, author, ex-president of The Federation of University Teachers' Association (FUTA)	
Clancy Fernando †	Admiral, Commander of Sri Lanka Navy (1991–92)	
Wilfred de Soysa	Planter, Businessman, Philanthropist	
Kumara Thirimadura	journalist, actor	
Punsiri Soysa	singer, musician	
Valence Mendis	Catholic Bishop of Chilaw (2006–present)	
Swithin Fernando	Anglican Bishop of Colombo (1978–87)	
Kenneth Fernando	Anglican Bishop of Colombo (1992–2001)	
Lahiru Thirimanne	International cricket player (2010–22)	
Amal Silva	International cricket player (1983–88)	
Somachandra de Silva	International cricket player (1975–85)	
Kusal Mendis	International cricket player (2015–present)	
Shehan Jayasuriya	International cricket player (2015–present)	
Chaminda Mendis	One Day International cricket player (1995)	
Jagath Chamila	Actor model	

== See also ==
- Education in Sri Lanka
