= Duleep De Chickera =

Right Reverend Duleep De Chickera
- Bishop of Colombo
- Church: Anglican Church of Ceylon
- See: Anglican Diocese of Colombo
- In office: 2001–2010
- Predecessor: Kenneth Fernando
- Successor: Dhiloraj Canagasabey

Personal details
- Born: 11 July 1948 (age 77) Sri Lanka

Duleep Kamil De Chickera is the 14th Anglican Bishop of Colombo, Sri Lanka. He was inaugurated in 2001.

Educated at Royal College, Colombo representing the college at 1st XV Rugby, he gained his training for the ministry at Theological College of Lanka in Pilimathalawa, earning a B.Th thereafter earning a M.Sc. from Keble College, Oxford.

He had served first as chaplain and then as the sub-warden of S. Thomas' College, Mt Lavinia from 1983 to 1989 before being consecrated as a bishop.

Bishop Duleep was accorded an honour in 2008 when he preached a key sermon at the Lambeth Conference in the presence of 650 Bishops from around the world. The conference was boycotted by around 200 bishops over the issues of sexuality and gender. "There is space equally for anyone and everyone, regardless of colour, ability, gender or sexual orientation. It is an inclusive communion", Bishop de Chickera orated at Canterbury Cathedral. Dr Rowan Williams, Archbishop of Canterbury, presided. The sermon orated by the Bishop of Colombo at the Lambeth Conference of 2009 received worldwide attention in the media.

== See also ==
- Church of Ceylon
- Anglican Bishop of Colombo

Religious titles
Preceded by Kenneth Fernando	Bishop of Colombo; 2001–2010	Succeeded by Dhiloraj Canagasabey
