= Dhiloraj Canagasabey =

Sri Lankan Tamil bishop

The Right Reverend Dhiloraj Canagasabey
- Anglican Bishop of Colombo
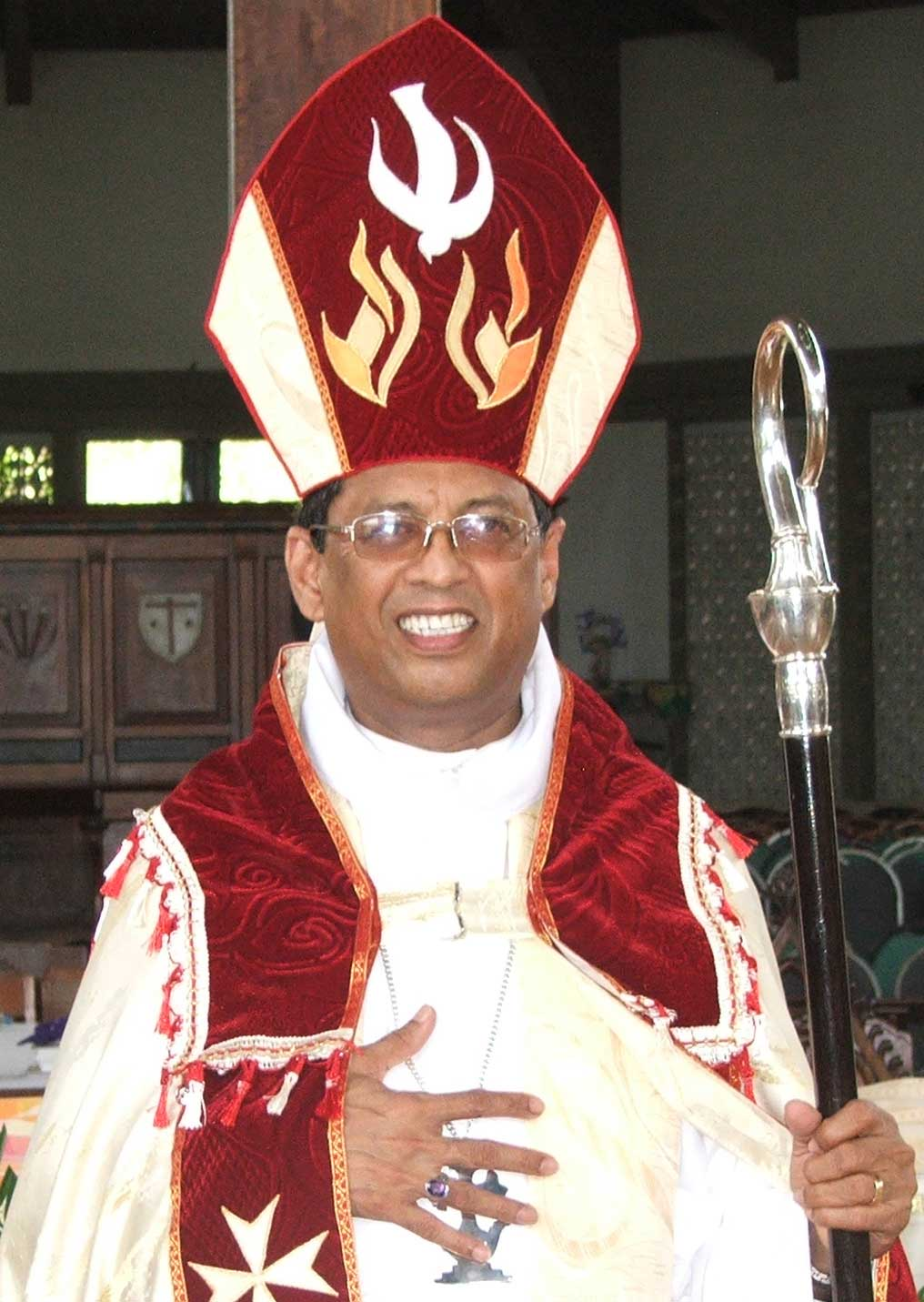
- Bishop Canagasabey
- Church: Church of Ceylon
- Diocese: Diocese of Colombo
- Installed: 14 May 2011
- Term ended: 28 September 2020
- Predecessor: Duleep De Chickera
- Successor: Dushantha Lakshman Rodrigo

Personal details
- Born: 23 May 1955 (age 71) Batticaloa, Ceylon
- Education: St. Michael's College National School; University of Serampore

Dhiloraj Ranjit Canagasabey (born 23 May 1955) is a Sri Lankan bishop who was the Anglican Bishop of Colombo in the Church of Ceylon from 14 May 2011 to 28 September 2020.

== Early life and family ==
Canagasabey was born on 23 May 1955 in a Tamil family in Batticaloa, Ceylon. He was educated at the St. Michael's College National School.

Canagasabey is married to Harshini, hailing from Colombo. They have a daughter (Dhilukshini) and a son (Dhiranjan).

== Career ==
Rev. Canagasabey being consecrated as bishop by Rt. Rev. Duleep Chickera, Rt. Rev. Shantha Francis and Rt. Rev. Dr. Euyakim Mar Coorilos Episcopa

After school Canagasabey joined the hospitality industry as management trainee at hotel school, later working at the Hotel Lanka Oberoi for five years. However, he later left the industry to study theology at the Theological College of Lanka, Pilimatalawa in 1977. He obtained Bachelor of Theology and Bachelor of Divinity degrees from the University of Serampore.

Canagasabey was ordained a deacon on 27 May 1983 and a priest on 3 June 1983. After serving in several parishes he became Archdeacon of Nuwara Eliya on 17 December 1997. He was chaplain and acting headmaster of S. Thomas' College, Bandarawela. On 5 March 2011 the Diocesan Council of the Diocese of Colombo elected Canagasabey to be the 15th Church of Ceylon Anglican Bishop of Colombo. He was consecrated on 14 May 2011 at the Cathedral of Christ the Living Saviour, Colombo by Rt. Rev. Duleep de Chickera, Vicar General and Arch Bishop’s Commissary - the outgoing Bishop, Rt. Rev. Shantha Francis, Presiding Bishop of the Church of Ceylon and Bishop of Kurunegala, Rt. Rev. Paul Sarker, Bishop of Dhaka (as representative of the Archbishop of Canterbury, the Most Rev. Dr. Rowan Williams), Rt. Rev. Dr. Euyakim Mar Coorilos Episcopa, Bishop of the Mar Thoma Syrian Church of Malabar, Rt. Rev. John Packer, Bishop of Ripon and Leeds, retired bishops Rt. Rev. Andrew Kumarage, Rt. Rev. Kenneth Fernando and Rt. Rev. Kumara Illangasinghe.
