= Anglican Bishop of Colombo =

The Anglican Bishop of Colombo is the ecclesiastical head of the Anglican Diocese of Colombo, a diocese in the Church of Ceylon which is part of the Anglican Communion. The Anglican Diocese of Colombo was founded in 1845, as the diocese of the Church of England in Ceylon.

== List of bishops ==
Bishops of Colombo
From	Until	Incumbent	Notes
1845	1861	James Chapman	first Bishop of Colombo installed in the presiding seat
1862	1871	Piers Claughton	first Bishop of St Helena (1859–61) and upon his return to England was appointed Archdeacon of London (1871–84)
1872	1875	Hugh Jermyn	translated to Bishop of Brechin (1875–1903) and Primus of Scotland (1886–1901)
1876	1902	Reginald Copleston	translated to Bishop of Calcutta and Metropolitan of India (1902–13)
1903	1924	Ernest Copleston	
1924	1938	Mark Carpenter-Garnier	
1938	1947	Cecil Horsley	appointed Bishop of Gibraltar (1947–53)
1948	1964	Rollo Graham Campbell	
1964	1971	Harold de Soysa	first Ceylonese Bishop of Colombo
1971	1977	Cyril Abeynaike	
1978	1987	Swithin Fernando	
1987	1992	Jabez Gnanapragasam	
1992	2001	Kenneth Fernando	
2001	2010	Duleep De Chickera	
2011	2020	Dhiloraj Canagasabey	
2020	present	Dushantha Lakshman Rodrigo	Consecrated and installed as the 16th Bishop of Colombo on 28 October 2020

== Publications ==
- One hundred years in Ceylon, or, The centenary volume of the Church Missionary Society in Ceylon, 1818–1918 (1922) Author: Balding, John William Madras: Printed at the Diocesan Press.
- The Church of Ceylon – her faith and mission Published in 1945, Printed at the Daily News Press by Bernard de Silva for the Church of Ceylon.
- The Church of Ceylon: A history, 1945–1995 Editor: Medis, Frederick Published for the Diocese of Colombo.
