= Reginald Beauchamp Downall =

Reginald Beauchamp Downall (26 July 1843 – 11 December 1888) was a British plantation owner and member of the Legislative Council of Ceylon.

Reginald Beauchamp Downall was born in 1843 in Kidderminster, the only son of Rev. John Downall (1803–1872), vicar of Okehampton, and Katherine Pyndar née Turner (1812–?). He attended Marlborough College in Wiltshire (1854–1856).

He traveled to Ceylon in 1866, where he joined George Wall and Company, assisting Watkin William Wynn on the Kent and Ambokka coffee estates in Matale. He was appointed as a visiting agent after eighteen months, and the company's representative in Kandy. He purchased his first estate, Middleton, in Dimbula, followed by another in Tangakelle. He then sold those to purchase a more substantial estate (Dambetenna and Lemastota) in Haputale in 1877. He then bought an estate in Monerakande. A year after this purchase coffee plantations in the country were devastated by a fungal disease Hemileia vastatrix (also known as coffee leaf rust) and coffee prices plummeted. He retained his coffee estates longer than most other owners, who converted their estates to tea, which almost lead to his financial ruin. His estates in Haputale were subsequently purchased by Sir Thomas Lipton and formed the basis of the Lipton tea empire.

In 1876 he became the planters' representative on the Legislative Council of Ceylon, serving on the Council until 1888. During his term of office he was of the prime movers for the extension of the railway, pushing for it to be extended from Nawalapitiya to Haputale. The extension finally occurring in 1893.

In 1874 Downall purchased Barnes Hall and operated it as a small guest house/hotel. In 1892 it was sold to the Nuwara Eliya Hotels Company Limited, who renovated and expanded the building into what is now known as the Grand Hotel.

Downall was also known as a keen cricketer, wild game hunter and horse racing enthusiast. He established a cricket club at Kandapolla, Haputale and was a regular participant in local and district cricket matches. He owned a pack of hounds, which he used for elk (sambar deer) hunting and often went buffalo and elephant shooting. Downall also owned a number of racehorses.

Suffering from stomach cancer he traveled to London for an operation in August 1988, which prolonged his life for a few months until 11 December, when he died at his sister's home in Flax Bourton. He was buried at Church of St Michael and All Angels, Flax Bourton. A plaque was erected in his memory at the Holy Trinity Church, Nuwara Eliya.
