= Douglas Meerwald =

Ceylon musician

Earle Douglas (Dougie) Meerwald was a pioneering Ceylonese musician. Dougie Meerwald was the vocalist of one of the leading Ceylonese swing and dance bands of the early 1950s - The Manhattans. Western popular music and dance band music was all the rage in South Asia after World War II and Ceylon was no exception.

In his youth Douglas Meerwald was a promising young cricketer who played with the 1st XI team of Carey College Colombo. However Meerwald's first love was music, leading him to join Don Daniel and the Ballroom Hornets and later The Manhattans dance band.

== The Manhattans ==
The band leader of The Manhattans was the Sri Lankan musician, Leonard Francke. Meerwald became the public face of The Manhattans, with his powerful voice and renditions of the songs of the Frank Sinatra, Bing Crosby, Gene Kelly, era. The Manhattans attracted some of the leading musicians of the day, including singer/saxophonist, Sam the Man, who he joined the band in August 1957.

The Manhattans played to packed ballrooms at the Grand Oriental Hotel and the Galle Face Hotel. Meerwald and The Manhattans had a strong fan base in Ceylon. He was also featured on Radio Ceylon in the late 1950s and 1960s including appearances on popular music programs like Talent Corner and StarMaker.

== St. Luke's Church Borella Choir ==
Douglas Meerwald and his father and uncle, Earl and Clair were also members of one of the leading church choirs at St. Luke's Church Borella of the Church of Ceylon. In 2006 St. Luke's Church Borella celebrated its 125th anniversary. The choir at St. Luke's appeared on Christmas radio programs of Radio Ceylon and the Sri Lanka Broadcasting Corporation in the 1960s and 1970s.

Douglas Meerwald died in Colombo in October 2003.

== Quotations about Douglas Meerwald ==
'Dougie Meerwald was the vocalist with the band,' says Sam as he spooled back to his career beginnings ... ' (Sam The Man)

- Source: Sunday Observer Colombo Sri Lanka

'Not content with Church singing, Douglas sang the standards with great acceptance. His interpretation of 'The Lady is the Tramp' has the stamp of class. Quite naturally band singing had to come and Douglas started with Don Daniel and his Ballroom Hornets. Later he joined The Manhattans ... he was on the air with The Manhattans on the popular series Bristol Nite.'

- Source: 'A Singing Meerwald' - EMCEE Article in the Ceylon Daily News (Vernon Corea writing in 1968)

'Douglas Meerwald was born into a very musical and talented Burgher family in Colombo, Ceylon. The Meerwald Family were well known for being first class, first rate musicians on the island. Meerwald was a dashing cricketer and all rounder at Carey College Colombo in the 1950s. He even won the Spooner Prize at Carey College. His first love was music - this was his natural God given talent. Douglas Meerwald decided to explore his musical talent. He joined Don Daniels and the Ballroom Hornets and learnt his craft. He soon built up a reputation as one of Colombo's finest 'crooners'. Subsequently Douglas Meerwald joined one of the most versatile and swingiest dance bands in Ceylon - The Manhattans.'

- Source: World Music Central

== See also ==
- Radio Ceylon
- List of Sri Lankan musicians
