= Grand Hotel (Nuwara Eliya) =

Hotel in Nuwara Eliya, Sri Lanka

The Grand Hotel Nuwara Eliya
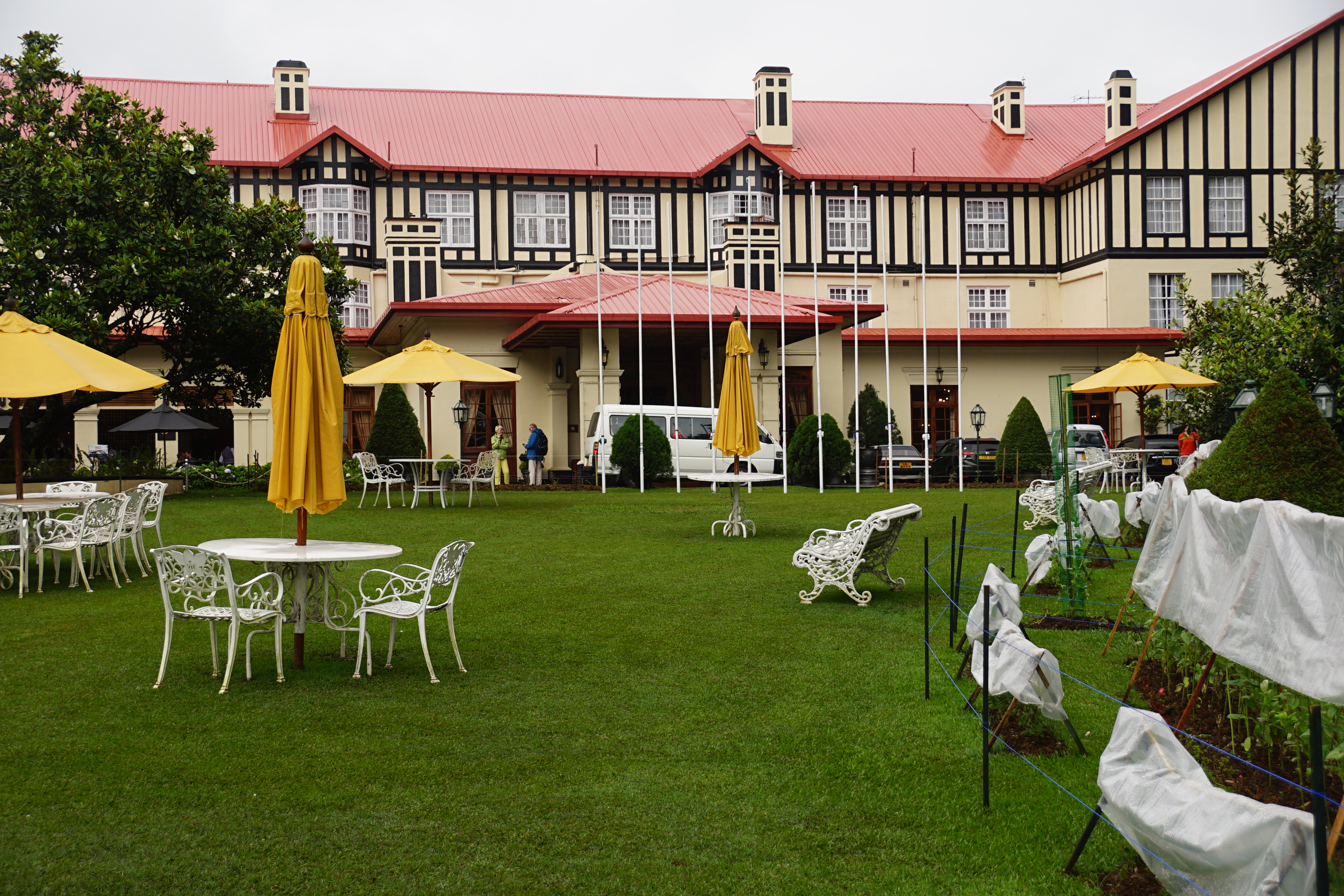
- Grand Hotel Nuwara Eliya

General information
- Location: Grand Hotel Road, Nuwara Eliya, Sri Lanka
- Management: Tangerine Hotels (Pvt) Ltd.

Technical details
- Floor count: 3
- Floor area: 15,660 m^{2} (168,600 sq ft)

Other information
- Number of rooms: 154
- Number of suites: 7
- Number of restaurants: 9

Website
- thegrandhotelnuwaraeliya.com
- Company
- Company type: Public
- Traded as: CSE: NEH.N0000
- ISIN: LK0130N00001
- Key people: J. H. P. Ratnayeke (Chairman); Gerard G. Ondaatjie (Deputy Chairman)
- Revenue: ▲LKR649 million (2022)
- Operating income: ▲LKR(58) million (2022)
- Net income: ▲LKR9 million (2022)
- Total assets: ▲LKR5,796 million (2022)
- Total equity: ▲LKR5,118 million (2022)
- Owner: Mercantile Investments and Finance PLC (26.12%); Nilaveli Beach Hotels (Pvt) Ltd (20.28%); G. G. Ondaatjie (10.89%)

Archaeological Protected Monument of Sri Lanka
- Designated: 23 February 2007

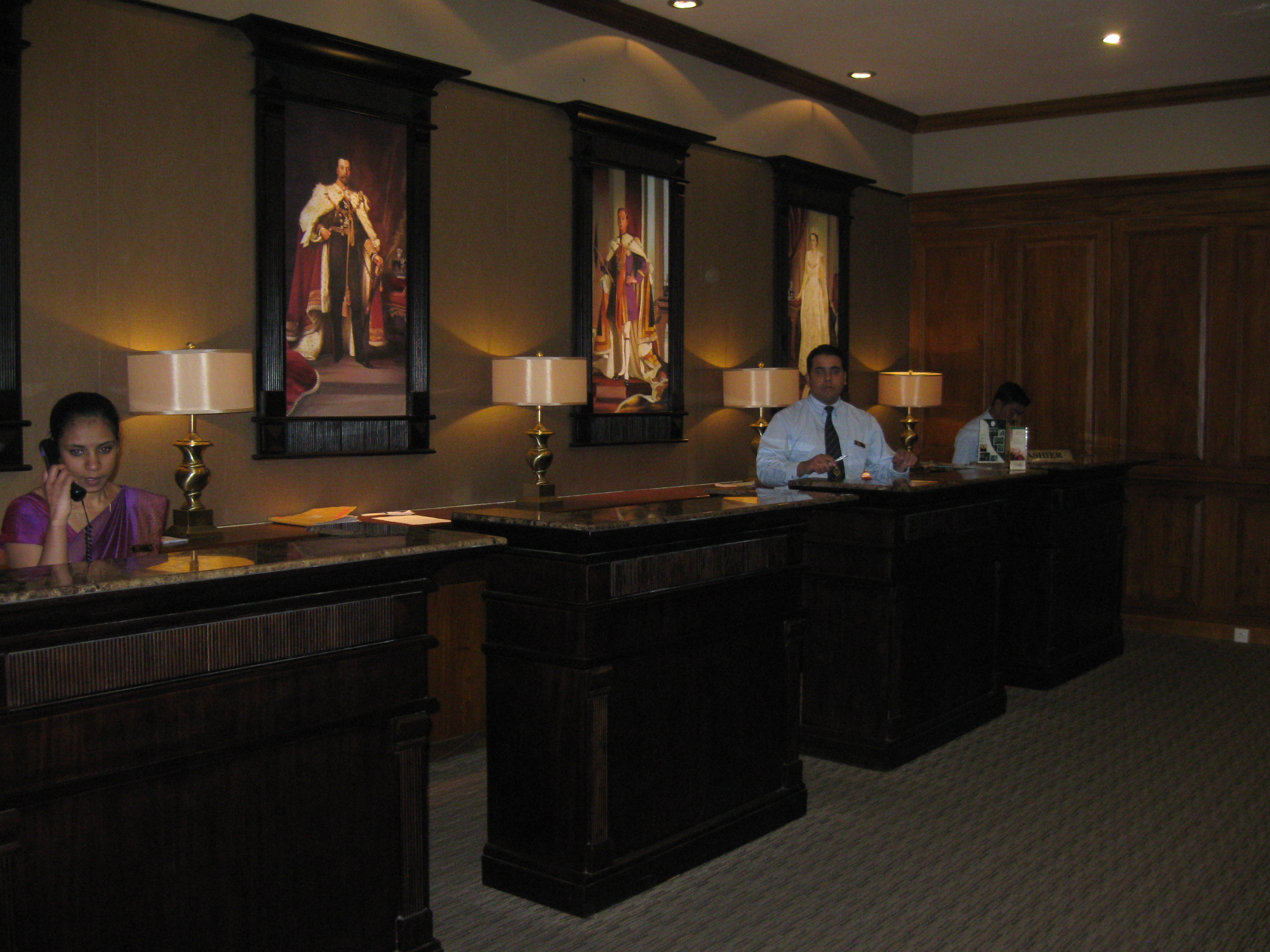
Reception, Grand Hotel Nuwara Eliya

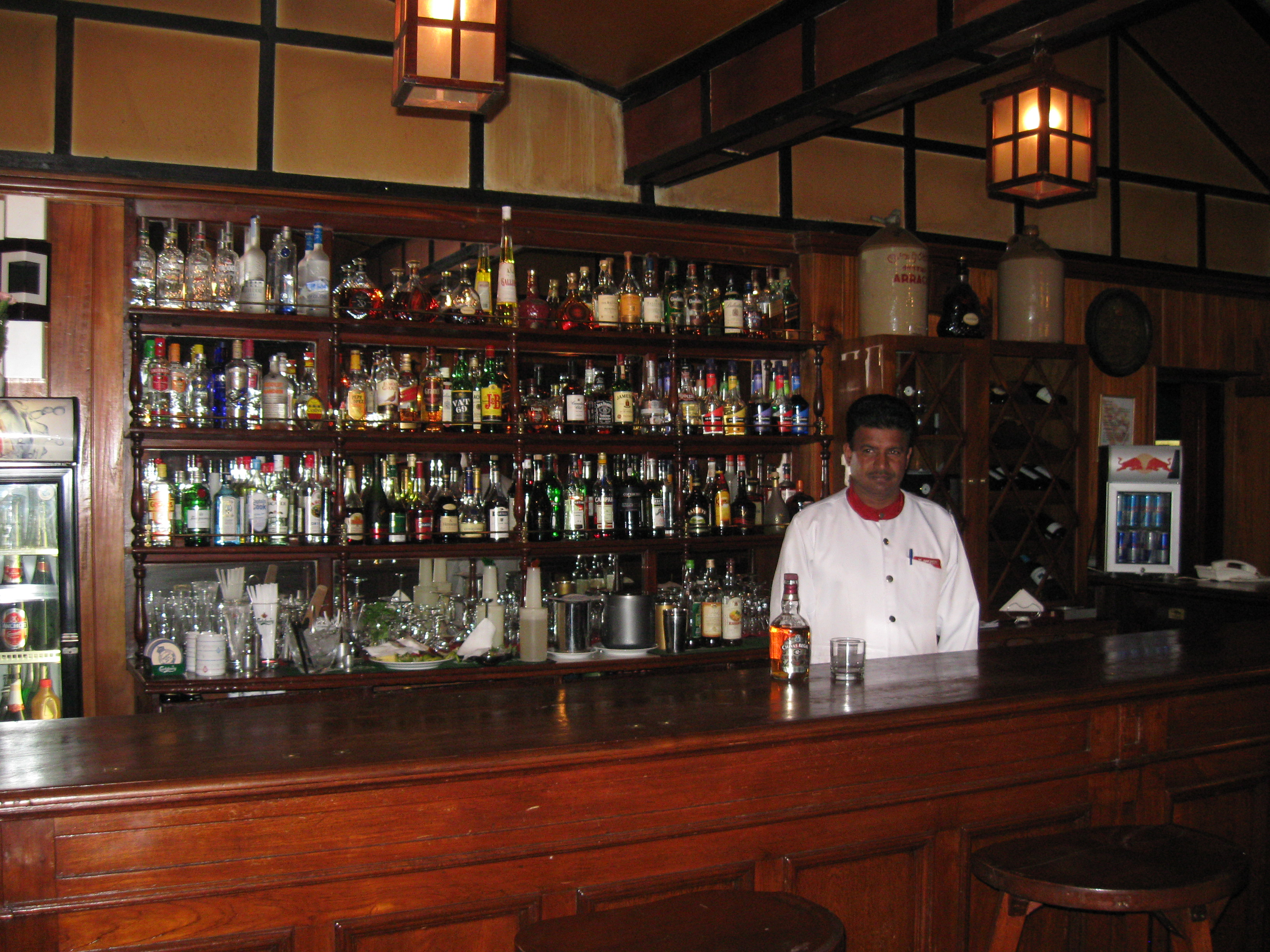
Bar, Grand Hotel Nuwara Eliya

The Grand Hotel is a four-star boutique hotel in Nuwara Eliya, Sri Lanka, that was built in the style of an Elizabethan-era manor house. The hotel has 154 rooms, including three presidential suites, four junior suites, including a governor's suite that have been maintained to preserve the traditional design. The Grand Hotel has a number of restaurants, bars and a billiards room.

== History ==
The original building, a single-storey bungalow, called 'Barnes Hall', was constructed as the holiday residence of Sir Edward Barnes, the fifth Governor of Ceylon (1776–1838) in 1828, for the sum of £8,000. Following Barnes' departure from Ceylon in 1831 it was rented to his successor as Governor, Sir Robert Wilmot-Horton. It was subsequently purchased by Reginald Beauchamp Downall (1843–1888), a planter and member of the Legislative Council of Ceylon, who operated it as a small guest house/hotel. On 12 April 1892 it was sold to the Nuwara Eliya Hotels Company Limited. William Milsom, owner of “property...... known as Barnes Hall on which is built the Grand Hotel” sold it to the Company for Rs. 35,000/-. The total area, which was in three separate lots amounted at the time of sale to approximately 27 acres. In the 1890s a second storey was added to the building. The northern wing (now known as the Governors Wing), originally only a single storey, linked by an archway with the main building, was added. A further extension was opened in 1904, with a second floor added to the northern wing linked by corridor with the additional floor of the main building. An additional southern wing (now known as the Golf Wing) was then added to the building. In the 1930s the third storey was constructed with its mock Tudor facade. The main restaurant, Barnes Hall, was named for the former governor. Notable guests who have stayed at the Grand include the Duc d’Abruzzi (brother of the Italian Sovereign), Leopold of Saxe-Coburg-Gotha (nephew of King Edward), the Grand Duke of Saxe-Weimar, Prince Reuss XXXII, the Maharaja of Kapurthala, Jagatjit Singh and Sir Thomas Lipton. Lord Mountbatten is also reported to have stayed at the Grand.

The Hotel hosted the 21st session of the SAARC Council of Ministers Conference on 10 March 1999.

== Awards ==
In 2012, National Geographic Traveler listed Sri Lanka as one of six countries to visit that year. In the same article, the Grand Hotel was listed as one of six places in the country to visit (the others being Adam's Peak, Sigiriya, Temple of the Tooth, Dambulla cave temple, and Yala National Park).

== Facilities ==
=== Accommodation ===
Grand Hotel features 154 rooms including seven suites.

=== Restaurants & Bars ===
The hotel has eight food & beverage outlets:

- Grand Indian Restaurant
- Grand Thai Restaurant
- Magnolia (all-day dining) Restaurant
- Barnes Restaurant
- Grand Cafe
- Dilmah Tea Lounge
- Public Bar
- Wine Bar
- The Library - Cocktail Lounge

=== Leisure Facilities ===
The hotel's leisure facilities include a spa, temperature-controlled indoor swimming pool, gymnasium, bird watching, air rifle shooting, bicycle tours, billiard room and a children's play area.
