= Sahan Wijeratne =

Sri Lankan cricketer (born 1984)

Personal information
- Full name: Mahamandige Sahan Rangana Wijeratne
- Born: 27 August 1984 (age 42); Colombo, Sri Lanka
- Batting: Right-handed
- Bowling: Right-arm offbreak
- Source: ESPNcricinfo, 20 January 2017

Sahan Wijeratne (born 27 August 1984) is a Sri Lankan cricketer. He has played more than 100 first-class matches since making his debut in the 2001/02 season.
