= Lantra Fernando =

Sri Lankan cricketer (1956–2014)

Personal information
- Born: 20 August 1956; Colombo, Sri Lanka
- Died: 23 June 2014 (aged 57); Moratuwa, Sri Lanka
- Source: Cricinfo, 18 April 2016

Lantra Fernando (20 August 1956 – 23 June 2014) was a Sri Lankan cricketer. He played first-class cricket for Moratuwa Sports Club and Old Cambrians Sports Club between 1980 and 1992. He was part of Sri Lanka's side during the South African rebel tours in 1982. In September 2018, he was one of 49 former Sri Lankan cricketers felicitated by Sri Lanka Cricket, to honour them for their services before Sri Lanka became a full member of the International Cricket Council (ICC).
