= St Luke's Church, Borella =

Church in Colombo, Sri Lanka

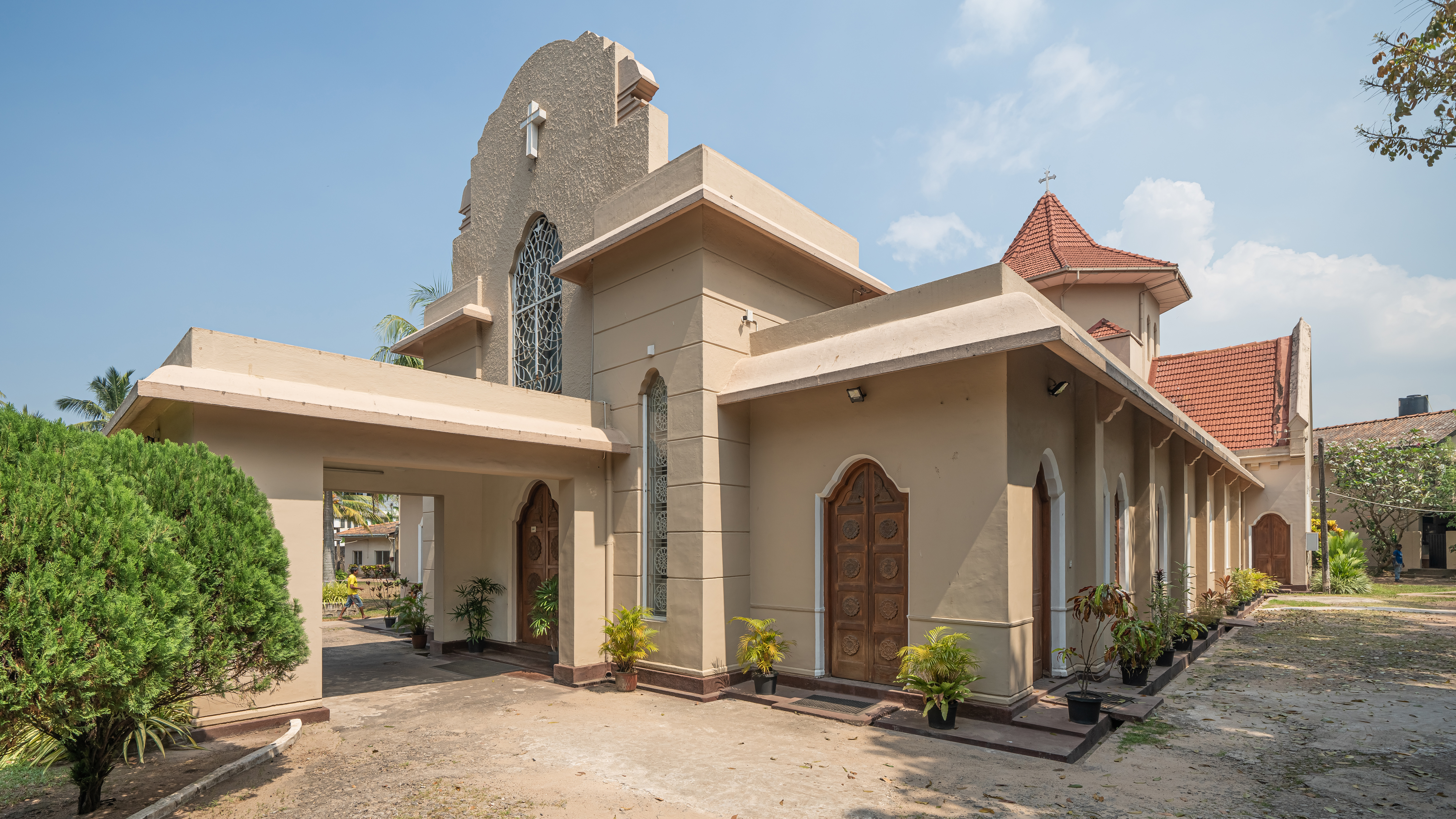
- St Luke's Church Borella, Colombo-8, Sri Lanka
- Interactive map of the St Luke's Church, Borella area

General information
- Type: Church
- Architectural style: Sinhalese / British
- Location: Borella, Colombo-8, Sri Lanka
- Coordinates: 6.91809°N 79.87485°E
- Construction started: Laying of foundation: 8 October 1881 / service of dedication: 30 June 1881
- Completed: Extension consecrated: 30 June 1941
- Owner: Anglican Church of Ceylon

Design and construction
- Other designers: Reverend Canon Ivan Corea

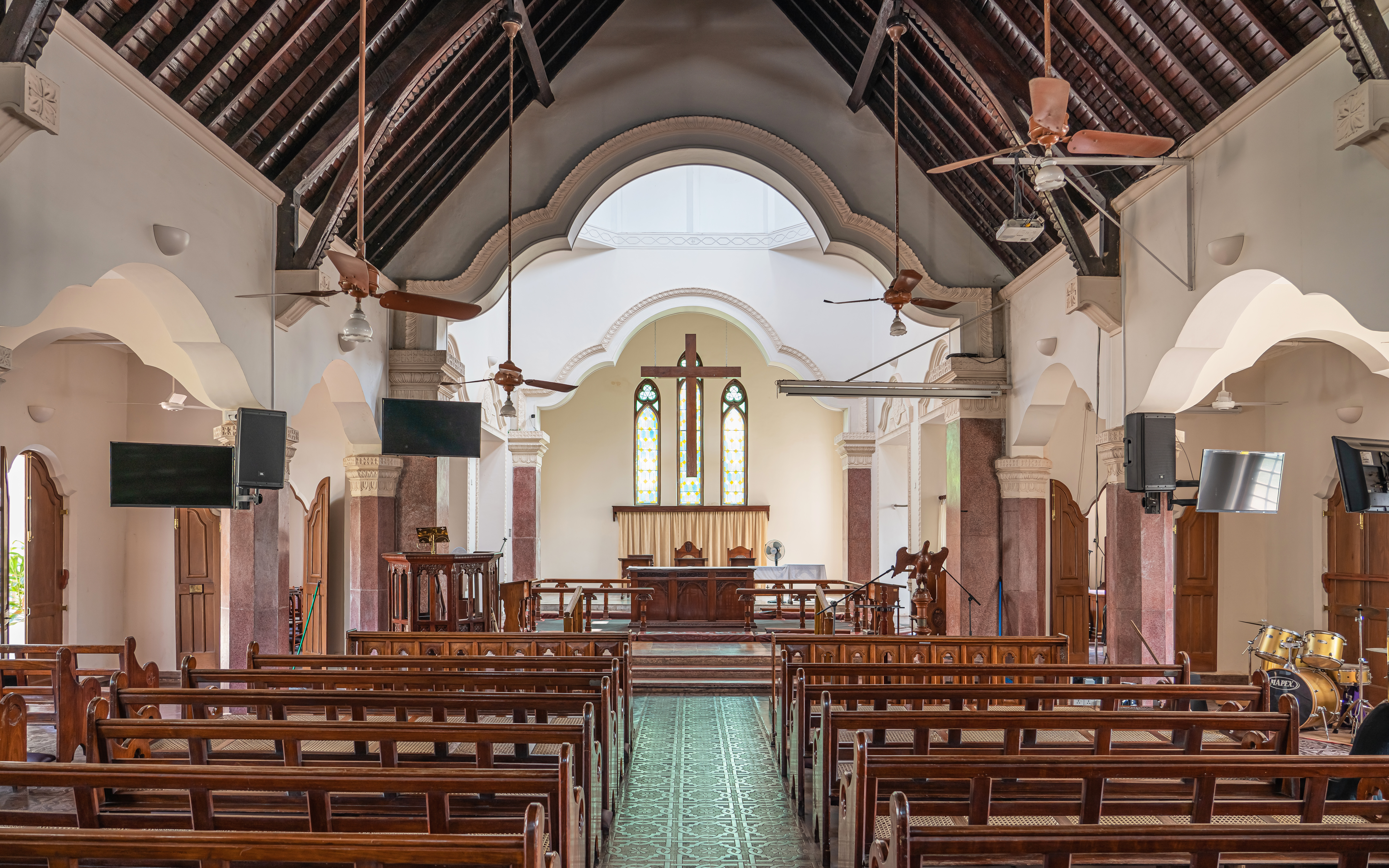
Interior of St. Luke's Church

St Luke's Church is situated in the Borella district of Colombo, the commercial capital of Sri Lanka. The church plays an important role within the history of the Church Missionary Society (CMS) on the island and is prominent within the Anglican Church in Sri Lanka.

== Early history ==
The Venerable Lorenz Beven, Archdeacon of Colombo noted that 'The development of Maradana in consequence of the establishment of hospitals in that area created the necessity for a Church. The first steps were taken at a meeting held on 5 October 1875 when it was decided to appeal for subscriptions. A piece of land nearly two acres in extent was acquired, the price paid being £300 per acre. The foundation was laid by the Reverend J. Ireland Jones on 8 October 1881 who also took the service of dedication on 30 June 1881. The rapid growth of the work in this Parish called for the enlargement of the Church and in 1937 a building scheme was launched and completed in time for the extended church to be consecrated by Bishop Horsley in 1941, the Diamond Jubilee Year of the Church.'

== Sinhalese architecture ==
The church is one of the finest examples of traditional Sinhalese architecture. The church has very unusual architecture: the clergyman behind the new design was Reverend Canon Ivan Corea who was Vicar of St Luke's Church, Borella, for 25 years (1929–1954). Canon Corea started a massive building programme in the 1930s. Bishop Horsley, who was Bishop of Colombo, consecrated the church on the day of its diamond jubilee on June 30, 1941. St Luke's Church was in the forefront of missionary activity including ministering to medical professionals in Colombo. A regular service was held at 5:30 am to cater to the needs of medical professionals before they went on duty in the local hospitals.

== Later history ==
When Radio Ceylon, the world's second oldest radio station, became a public corporation in January 1967 and changed its name to the Ceylon Broadcasting Corporation, a service of thanksgiving was held at St Luke's Church, Borella. The service was attended by national and international broadcasters including the Director-General of CBC, Neville Jayaweera.

The choir of St Luke's Church has been featured on several Christmas and Easter radio programmes on Radio Ceylon and subsequently the Sri Lanka Broadcasting Corporation. Notable Sri Lankan musicians have been members of the choir, including the big band musician Douglas Meerwald.

Several Bishops of Colombo of the Church of Ceylon have served as vicars or curates of St Luke's Church, among them Bishop Cyril Abeynaike, Bishop Swithin Fernando and Bishop Kenneth Fernando.

== See also ==
- Easter Sunday Raid

== Publications ==
- One Hundred Years in Ceylon, or, The centenary volume of the Church Missionary Society in Ceylon, 1818-1918; by John William Balding Madras: Printed at the Diocesan Press, 1922
- The Church of Ceylon: her faith and mission Colombo: Printed at the Daily News Press by Bernard de Silva for the Church of Ceylon, 1945
- The Church of Ceylon: a history, 1945-1995; editor: Frederick Medis. Colombo: for the Diocese of Colombo, 1995 ISBN 9559411004
- A History of the Diocese of Colombo: a centenary volume; editor: Archdeacon F. Lorenz Beven. Colombo: for the Diocese of Colombo, 1941
