= James Chapman (bishop) =

The Right Reverend James Chapman
- Bishop of Colombo
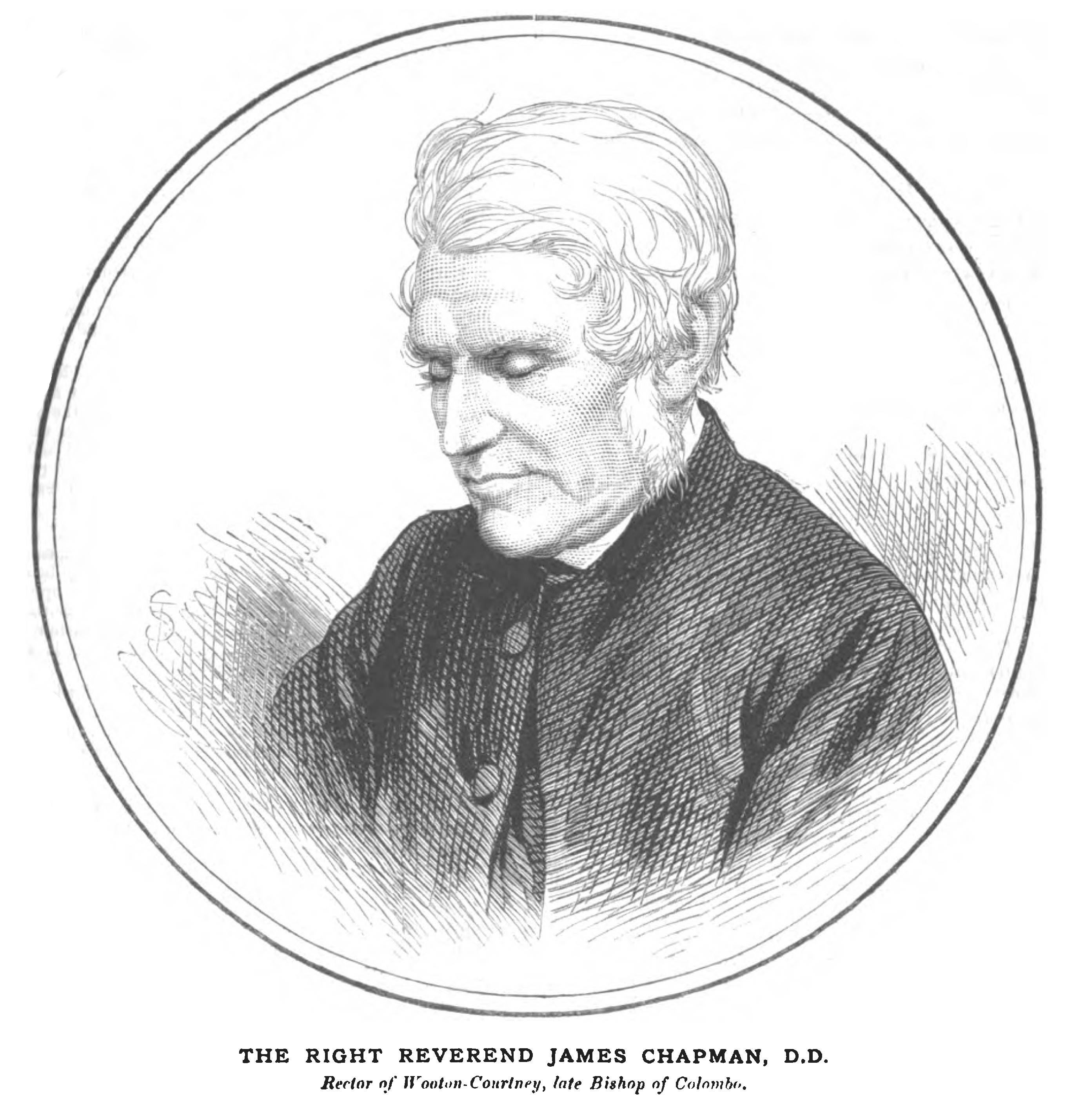
- Church: Anglican Church of Ceylon
- Diocese: Diocese of Colombo
- Appointed: 1845
- Installed: 7 November 1845
- Term ended: 1861

Personal details
- Born: 1799
- Died: 1879 (aged 79–80)
- Denomination: Anglican
- Profession: clergyman
- Education: Eton College; King's College, Cambridge

James Chapman (1799–1879) was the first Anglican Bishop of Colombo, in British Ceylon (now Sri Lanka), serving from 1845 to 1861.

== Life ==
He was educated at Eton and King's College, Cambridge, where he graduated Bachelor of Arts (BA) in 1823, and Cambridge Master of Arts (MA Cantab) in 1826. He was made deacon in Ely in 1824 and ordained priest the next year in Chichester. He became a Fellow of King's College, one of the Masters of Eton, and Evening Lecturer at Windsor. In 1834, he was appointed to the Rectory of Dunton Wayletts, in Essex, the patronage of which was with King's College.

On 7 November 1845, he was consecrated as the first Bishop of Colombo at St Peter's Church, Colombo, and received the degree of Doctor of Divinity (DD) from his University. In 1851, Chapman founded S. Thomas' College when it was in Mutwal before it relocated to its present site in Mount Lavinia Under medical advice because of his ill-health, he resigned the See of Colombo in 1861, and was elected a Fellow of Eton College, and was presented by the college in 1863 to the Rectory of Wootton Courtenay, Somerset. In 1868, he was made Prebendary of Warminster in Wells Cathedral. He was the author of occasional Charges, Sermons and Journals. During the mid-1860s, he undertook several bishop's duties (including ordinations of deacons/priests and consecrations of church buildings) in the Diocese of Exeter. In the late 1860s, when Robert Eden, Bishop of Bath and Wells, was ill, Chapman also assisted him as Coadjutor Bishop of Bath and Wells.

He died in 1879.

== See also ==
- Church of Ceylon
- Anglican Bishop of Colombo
