= Diocese of Colombo (Anglican) =

Location
- Country: Sri Lanka
- Ecclesiastical province: Extra-Provincial Diocese
- Metropolitan: Sarah Mullally
- Archdeaconries: Colombo, Nuwara Eliya, Galle, Jaffna

Statistics
- Area: 3,838 km^{2} (1,482 sq mi)
- Population: Total: (as of 2006); 5,692,004
- Churches: 121
- Schools: 10

Information
- Denomination: Church of Ceylon
- Rite: Anglican / Christian
- Established: 1886
- Cathedral: Cathedral of Christ the Living Saviour
- Co-cathedral: Christ Church, Mutwal
- Secular priests: 127

Current leadership
- Bishop of Colombo: Dushantha Lakshman Rodrigo
- Archdeacons: Sunil Shantha Gunathilake; Christopher Balaraj; S.D.P Selvan; Charles David

Map
- A map of the Diocese of Colombo

Website
- Website of the Diocese of Colombo

The Diocese of Colombo (Anglican Church of Ceylon) is based in Colombo, Sri Lanka. The diocesan bishop's seat is Cathedral of Christ the Living Saviour. The current bishop of Colombo is Dushantha Lakshman Rodrigo.

The Diocese of Colombo covers the Western, Southern, Eastern, Northern and Uva Provinces together with the Ratnapura, Nuwara Eliya and Puttalam districts.

== History ==
The first Church of England services were held on the island in 1796. In 1818, missionaries were sent to Ceylon to spread the church. Originally, it had been part of the diocese of Calcutta and later Madras. In 1930, the Church of India, Burma and Ceylon became autonomous. The Diocese of Colombo was founded in 1845, as the diocese of the Church of England in Ceylon with the appointment of its first bishop, James Chapman. It was established by law in 1886. Revd. John Hensman was the first Ordained Tamil Priest of Ceylon in 1865 by Church of England in Ceylon.

In 1947, the churches of South India united to form the new Church of South India. The churches in North India and Pakistan followed soon after. Burma and Bangladesh formed their own church. Sri Lanka therefore became extraprovincial within the Anglican Communion under the metropolitical authority of the Archbishop of Canterbury.

Diocese of Colombo, functions from 368/3a, Bhaudhaloka Mawatha, Colombo 00700. Mr Harshana Perera serves as the Registrar, Mr Yohan Perera Serves as the Treasurer, Mr Arun Gamalathge functions as the Diocesan Secretary and Mr Dinesh Hensman as the General Manager overlooking administration & property.

In 1946, the Diocese of Kurunegala was formed out of the diocese of Colombo to include parts of the North-Western, North-Central and Central Provinces of Sri Lanka. The Diocese of Kurunagala was legally recognised in 1972. Together, the Diocese of Colombo and Kurunagala constitute the Church of Ceylon.

== See also ==
- Cathedral of Christ the Living Saviour
- St Luke's Church, Borella
- St Michael and All Angels Church, Polwatte
- St. Paul's Church, Milagiriya
- St Peter's Church, Colombo
