= Bishop of Colombo =

Bishop of Colombo may refer to:

- Anglican Bishop of Colombo
- Catholic Bishop of Colombo
