= Srilal Weerasooriya =

Sri Lankan senior army general

General Srilal Weerasooriya RWP, RSP, VSV, USP
- ශ්‍රීලාල් වීරසූරිය
- Born: Chandrika Srilal Weerasooriya; 22 December 1943 (age 82); Karawanella, Ceylon
- Alma mater: S. Thomas' College, Mt Lavinia; Pakistan Military Academy; National Defense College
- Spouse: Dilhani Weerasooriya
- Relatives: Tilak Weerasooriya; David Paynter; Arnolis Weerasooriya
- Military career
- Allegiance: Sri Lanka
- Branch: Sri Lanka Army
- Service years: 1963–2000
- Rank: General
- Nickname: Lal
- Service number: O/50417
- Unit: Sri Lanka Artillery
- Commands: Commander of the Sri Lankan Army
- Wars/Battles: 1971 JVP Insurrection; 1987–1989 JVP insurrection; Eelam War I-III; Riviresa; Sathjaya I-III; Jayasikuru; Leap Forward
- Awards: Rana Wickrama Padakkama; Rana Sura Padakkama; Vishista Seva Vibhushanaya; Uttama Seva Padakkama; Sitara-e-Pakistan
- Other work: Sri Lankan High Commissioner to Pakistan, Tajikistan and Kyrgyzstan (2000-2007)

General Chandrika Srilal Weerasooriya (Sinhala :චන්ද්‍රිකා ශ්‍රීලාල් වීරසූරිය) or 'C.S. Weerasooriya', RWP, RSP, VSV, USP is a retired Sri Lankan Army officer. He was the 15th Commander of the Sri Lankan Army (1998-2000) and a former Sri Lankan High Commissioner to Pakistan, Tajikistan and Kyrgyzstan (2000-2007).

== Early life and education ==
C.S. Weerasooriya was born in Karawanella, Ceylon, on 22 December 1943, to Charles Richard Percival Weerasooriya and his wife Harriet Freda. C.S. Weerasooriya had his primary and secondary education at S. Thomas' College, Mount Lavinia. He is the nephew of David Paynter and the grand nephew of Arnolis Weerasooriya of the Weerasooriya family of Dodanduwa, Hikkaduwa.

== Military career ==
C.S. Weerasooriya was enlisted into the Ceylon Army on 09 May 1963 as an Officer Cadet. He was a member of the first batch that was trained at the Pakistan Military Academy from 1963 to 1965.

He was commissioned on 11 September 1965 into the 4th Regiment Ceylon Artillery.

Over the years, C.S. Weerasooriya followed the Regimental Officers Survey Course, Long Gunnery Staff Course, and the Senior Command (Artillery) Course, all of these in India.

On 08 March 1985, he was promoted to the rank of Lieutenant Colonel, subsequently assuming the role of Commanding Officer of the 4th Field Artillery Regiment from March 1985 to March 1987. His dedication and competence led to his promotion to Colonel on 01 October 1988 and Brigadier on 01 May 1989. In 1994, C.S. Weerasooriya followed the National Defense College Course in New Delhi, India, subsequent to which he was promoted to the rank of Major General.

During his military career, apart from regimental appointments, he held the appointment of Military Assistant (MA) to the Commander, Gen Denis Perera, in 1981. Thereafter, he held the senior appointments of Regimental Commander Artillery, Commandant Army Training Centre Diyatalawa, Commander 22 Brigade and Coordinating Officer Trincomalee, Commander 12 Brigade Colombo, Commander 1 Brigade and Coordinating Officer Ampara District, Commander 5 Brigade Group Mannar and Coordinating Officer Mannar District, Commander Artillery Brigade, Director Operations Army Headquarters (D Ops), General Officer Commanding Task Force 1 and Coordinator in Chief Jaffna District, Overall Operations Commander - Joint Operations Headquarters - Vuvuniya, Deputy Chief of Staff, and Chief of Staff.

On 16 December 1998 C.S. Weerasooriya was appointed Commander of the Sri Lanka Army with the rank of Lieutenant General. He held this position until his retirement on 24 August 2000. Upon his retirement, he was promoted to the rank of General. C.S. Weerasooriya was succeeded by L. P. Balagalle.

== Awards and decorations ==
C.S. Weerasooriya has received some of the highest awards in the Sri Lankan armed forces, which include the Rana Wickrama Padakkama, Rana Sura Padakkama, Vishista Seva Vibhushanaya, and the Uttama Seva Padakkama. He was awarded the Sitara-e-Pakistan (Star of Pakistan) by the Government of Pakistan for services to Pakistan during his tenure as High Commissioner.

Rana Wickrama Padakkama
Rana Sura Padakkama
Vishista Seva Vibhushanaya
Uttama Seva Padakkama
Purna Bhumi Padakkama
Vadamarachchi Operation Medal
Republic of Sri Lanka Armed Services Medal
50th Independence Anniversary Commemoration Medal
Sri Lanka Army 50th Anniversary Medal
Sri Lanka Army 25th Anniversary Medal
Sri Lanka Armed Services Long Service Medal
President's Inauguration Medal

== Later life ==
In 2000 he was appointed Sri Lankan High Commissioner to Pakistan and served in this capacity for six years. Pakistan signed its first ever Free Trade Agreement, during C.S. Weerasooriya's tenure as High Commissioner, with Sri Lanka. His close friendship with former Chief of Army Staff and President, Pervez Musharraf, resulted in much support being given by Pakistan towards Sri Lanka's war effort, during C.S. Weerasooriya's tenure as High Commissioner.

Upon his return to Sri Lanka, C.S. Weerasooriya served as an Independent Non-executive Director of Ceylinco Life PLC from 2010 to 2022. and as the International President of the Association of Military Christian Fellowships (AMCF), from 2012 to 2022. He was the first South Asian to hold this position.

Military offices
Preceded by Lieutenant General Rohan Daluwatte	Commander of the Sri Lankan Army; 1998-2000	Succeeded by Lieutenant General Lionel Balagalle
Preceded by Major General H.S. Hapuarachchi	Chief of Staff of the Sri Lankan Army; 1998-1998	Succeeded by Major General Patrick Fernando
