= Choir of Trinity College, Kandy =

Sri Lankan boys' choir

- Choir
- Origin: British Ceylon, Church Missionary Society
- Founded: 1872
- Founder: Clement Edwards
- Genre: Choral
- Members: School boys aged 9-19 SATB
- Choirmaster: Lasantha Tennekoon
- Organist: Sadhana Madasekara
- Affiliation: Trinity College, Kandy
- Website: trinitycollege.lk/choir/

The Choir of Trinity College, Kandy, Sri Lanka, is a Boys' choir that continues a choral tradition dating back to the school's founding in 1872. The choir plays a central role in Christian worship at the school, which was founded by the Church Missionary Society, and continues its affiliations to the Anglican Church of Ceylon.

The choir leads worship at Holy Trinity Church, Kandy on Sundays and two days of the week during the academic terms of the college. In addition, the choir is actively involved in the music life of the school.

== History ==
The choir was established at the same time as the school in 1872, with Clement Edwards as its founding choirmaster. From the mid-1940s a rapid development of the choir is recorded with performance of operettas, and publication of a book with traditional songs and hymns. In 1946 commenced an annual performance of A Festival of Nine Lessons and Carols. Audio tapes of the choir were broadcast over the local radio and the BBC World Service.

In 2018, the choir had the privilege of performing for Prince Edward, Earl of Wessex and Sophie, Countess of Wessex, on their visit Sri Lanka on behalf of Queen Elizabeth II as part of celebrations to mark the country's 70th independence. The choir led the singing of "God Save the Queen" and later performed George Frideric Handel's, Hallelujah Chorus.

The choir performs mostly Christian choral music that ranges from renaissance music to modern music. In addition to that it performs secular music ranging from folk music, pop music through to jazz, including Afro-American spirituals.

== Choristers ==
The choristers consist of boys from the ages of 9 to 19 years. They are chosen generally at the younger ages as young sopranos and continue to remain as choristers until they graduate from school. They are not essentially students of music or singing, but auditioned based on their keenness to sing.

== Events ==
There are two regular traditional events in the year for the choir, 'A Festival of Nine Lessons and Carols' held in Advent, which has been held close to 50 years at the chapel. 'The Cross & Triumph of Christ', similar to the traditional 'Cross of Christ' at Lent, is held on Palm Sunday. In addition to these events, a public concert with secular music is staged by the choir mid-year.

The choir also has performance engagements throughout the year, including collaborated events with other choirs and music festivals. These include choirs from other schools both local and international, including performances with the Assens Boys Choir and the Choir of Jesus College, Cambridge. The choir also produced a recording of Christmas Carols in 2008.

== Choirmasters/mistresses and accompanists ==
Choirmasters/mistresses

- 1872: Clement Edwards
- 1880: Cyril Siebel

No records of some years in between

- 1940: Valesca Reimann
- 1946: Maj. Gordon Burrows,(Aide-de-camp of Lord Mountbatten)
- 1963: Kay Cripps and Rev. Michael Brown
- 1965: Ronald Thangiah
- 1973: Dilanthi Fernando
- 1974: Dilanthi Fernando and Harry Goonethilake
- 1975: Walter Perera
- 1981: Harry Goonathilake
- 1983: Andrew Pye
- 1986: Ronald Thangiah
- 2007–present: Lasantha Tennekoon

Accompanists

- 1957: Errol Fernando
- 1964: Barnabas Alexander
- 2009–present: Sadhana Madasekara
