= Weerasooriya =

Weerasooriya වීරසූරිය
- Pronunciation: virasūriya
- Language: Sinhala

Origin
- Language: Sanskrit
- Origin: South Asia
- Meaning: Brave Hero + Solar Dynasty
- Region of origin: Sri Lanka

Other names
- Variant form: Weerasuriya

Weerasooriya or Weerasuriya (Sinhala: වීරසූරිය, romanized: virasūriya) is a Sinhalese surname, with origins tracing back to South of Sri Lanka. The word Weera means brave or hero, and sooriya is meant to denote the ancestry and descent from the Kshatriya Solar Dynasty, which is quite common among Karava, even Govigama names.

== Notable people ==
- Arnolis Weerasooriya (1854-1888), first Ceylonese Colonel, and Sinhalese member of the Salvation Army
- Channa Weerasuriya, Sri Lankan army officer
- Priyantha Weerasooriya (born 1969), Sri Lankan police officer and 37th Inspector general
- Risira Weerasuriya (born 2000), Sri Lankan cricketer
- Sri Piyaratana Tissa Mahanayake Thero (1826-1907) - Mahanayaka Thero of the Amarapura Nikaya (circa 1860s), and the Sanganayake of the Southern Province
- Srilal Weerasooriya (born 1943), 15th Commander of the Sri Lankan Army and a former Sri Lankan High Commissioner to Pakistan
- Tilak Weerasooriya (1967-2022), Sri Lankan Physician & Academic
