= List of Latin phrases (R) =

This page is one of a series listing English translations of notable Latin phrases, such as veni, vidi, vici and et cetera. Some of the phrases are themselves translations of Greek phrases, as ancient Greek rhetoric and literature started centuries before the beginning of Latin literature in ancient Rome.

Latin	Translation	Notes
radix malorum est cupiditas	the root of evils is desire	Or "greed is the root of all evil". Theme of "The Pardoner's Tale" from The Canterbury Tales.
rara avis (rarissima avis)	rare bird (very rare bird)	An extraordinary or unusual thing. From Juvenal's Satires VI: rara avis in terris nigroque simillima cygno ("a rare bird in the lands, and very like a black swan").
rari nantes in gurgite vasto	Rare survivors in the immense sea	Virgil, Aeneid, I, 118
ratio decidendi	reasoning for the decision	The legal, moral, political, and social principles used by a court to compose a judgment's rationale.
ratio legis	reasoning of law	A law's foundation or basis.
ratione personae	by reason of his/her person	Also "jurisdiction ratione personae" the personal reach of the courts jurisdiction.
ratione soli	by account of the ground	Or "according to the soil". Assigning property rights to a thing based on its presence on a landowner's property.
ratum et consummatum	confirmed and completed	in Canon law, a consummated marriage
ratum tantum	confirmed only	in Canon law, a confirmed but unconsummated marriage (which can be dissolved super rato)
re	[in] the matter of	More literally, "by the thing". From the ablative of res ("thing" or "circumstance"). It is a common misconception that the "Re:" in correspondence is an abbreviation for regarding or reply; this is not the case for traditional letters. However, when used in an e-mail subject, there is evidence that it functions as an abbreviation of regarding rather than the Latin word for thing. The use of Latin re, in the sense of "about", "concerning", is English usage.
rebus sic stantibus	with matters standing thus	The doctrine that treaty obligations hold only as long as the fundamental conditions and expectations that existed at the time of their creation hold.
recte et fortiter	Upright and Strong	Motto of Homebush Boys High School
recte et fideliter	Upright and Faithful	Also "just and faithful" and "accurately and faithfully". Motto of Ruyton Girls' School
redde rationem	to give an account	Taken from the Gospel of Luke 16:2.
reductio ad absurdum	leading back to the absurd	A common debate technique, and a method of proof in mathematics and philosophy, that proves the thesis by showing that its opposite is absurd or logically untenable. In general usage outside mathematics and philosophy, a reductio ad absurdum is a tactic in which the logic of an argument is challenged by reducing the concept to its most absurd extreme. Translated from Aristotle's "ἡ εις άτοπον απαγωγη" (hi eis atopon apagogi, "reduction to the impossible").
reductio ad Hitlerum	leading back to Hitler	A term coined by German-American political philosopher Leo Strauss to humorously describe a fallacious argument that compares an opponent's views to those held by Adolf Hitler or the Nazi Party. Derived from reductio ad absurdum.
reductio ad infinitum	leading back to the infinite	An argument that creates an infinite series of causes that does not seem to have a beginning. As a fallacy, it rests upon Aristotle's notion that all things must have a cause, but that all series of causes must have a sufficient cause, that is, an unmoved mover. An argument which does not seem to have such a beginning becomes difficult to imagine. If it can be established, separately, that the chain must have a start, then a reductio ad infinitum is a valid refutation technique.
reformatio in peius	change to worse	A decision from a court of appeal is amended to a worse one. With certain exceptions, this is prohibited at the Boards of Appeal of the European Patent Office by case law.
regem ego comitem me comes regem	you made me a Count, I will make you a King	Motto of the Forbin family
reginam occidere	to kill the queen	Written by John, archbishop of Esztergom, to Hungarian nobles planning the assassination of Gertrude of Merania. The full sentence, Reginam occidere nolite timere bonum est si omnes consentiunt ego non contradico, has two contradictory meanings depending on how it is punctuated: either Reginam occidere nolite timere; bonum est; si omnes consentiunt, ego non contradico (do not fear to kill the queen, it is right; if everyone agrees, I do not oppose it) or Reginam occidere nolite; timere bonum est; si omnes consentiunt, ego non; contradico (do not kill the queen; it is good to fear [doing so]; [even] if everyone agrees, I do not; I oppose it). The queen was assassinated as the plotters saw the bishop's message as an encouragement.
regnat populus	the people rule	State motto of Arkansas, adopted in 1907. Originally rendered in 1864 in the plural, regnant populi ("the peoples rule"), but subsequently changed to the singular.
regnet christus	Christ reigns	motto of Our Lady of the Sacred Heart College, Sydney
regnum juris regnum pacis	rule of law, rule of peace	Motto of the Henry N.R. Jackman Faculty of Law at the University of Toronto
Regnum Mariae Patrona Hungariae	Kingdom of Mary, the Patron of Hungary	Former motto of Hungary
regressus ad uterum	return to the womb	Concept used in psychoanalysis by Sándor Ferenczi and the Budapest School
rem acu tetigisti	You have touched the point with a needle	i.e., "You have hit the nail on the head"
rem tene, verba sequentur	Understand the matter, the words will follow	That is, know the contents of your argument, what you intend to say, and then the way to say it, the precise words, will come easily.
Renovatio imperii Romanorum	Renewal of the empire of the Romans	A phrase declaring an intention to restore the Roman Empire.
renovatio urbis	urban renewal	a period of city planning and architectural updating in Renaissance Italy, i.e. the vast architectural programme begun under Doge Andrea Gritti in Venice
repetita iuvant	repeating does good	Lit: "Repeated things help". Usually said as a jocular remark to defend the speaker's (or writer's) choice to repeat some important piece of information to ensure reception by the audience.
repetitio est mater studiorum	repetition is the mother of study/learning	An adage whose concept is sometimes traced back to the Institutions of Cassiodorus or to the pedagogical approach of Comenius
requiem aeternam dona ei(s), Domine	give him/her (them) eternal rest, O Lord	From the Christian prayer Eternal Rest, said for the dead. Source of the term requiem, meaning the Mass for the Dead or a musical setting thereof.
requiescat in pace (R.I.P.)	let him/her rest in peace	Or "may he/she rest in peace". A benediction for the dead. Often inscribed on tombstones or other grave markers. "RIP" is commonly reinterpreted as meaning the English phrase "Rest In Peace", the two meaning essentially the same thing.
rerum cognoscere causas	to learn the causes of things	Motto of the University of Sheffield, the University of Guelph, and London School of Economics.
res derelictae	abandoned thing	Voluntarily abandoned property; a form of res nullius that can thereby be acquired principally through occupatio, or by other means in their specific contexts.
res firma mitescere nescit	a firm resolve does not know how to weaken	Used in the 1985 film American Flyers where it is colloquially translated as "once you got it up, keep it up".
res gestae	things done	A phrase used in law representing the belief that certain statements are made naturally, spontaneously and without deliberation during the course of an event, they leave little room for misunderstanding/misinterpretation upon hearing by someone else (i.e. by the witness who will later repeat the statement to the court). As a result, the courts believe that such statements carry a high degree of credibility, and may admit them as an exception to the rule against hearsay.
res ipsa loquitur	the thing speaks for itself	A phrase from the common law of torts meaning that negligence can be inferred from the fact that such an accident happened, without proof of exactly how.
res judicata	judged thing	A matter which has been decided by a court. Often refers to the legal concept that once a matter has been finally decided by the courts, it cannot be litigated again (cf. non bis in idem and double jeopardy).
res, non verba	"actions speak louder than words", or "deeds, not words"	From rēs ("things, facts") the plural of rēs ("a thing, a fact") + nōn ("not") + verba ("words") the plural of verbum ("a word"). Literally meaning "things, not words" or "facts instead of words" but referring to that "actions be used instead of words".
res nullius	nobody's property	Goods without an owner. Used for things or beings which belong to nobody and are up for grabs, e.g., uninhabited and uncolonized lands, wandering wild animals, etc. (cf. terra nullius, "no man's land").
res publica	Pertaining to the state or public	source of the word republic
respice adspice prospice	look behind, look here, look ahead	i.e., "examine the past, the present and future". Motto of CCNY.
respice finem	look back at the end	i.e., "have regard for the end" or "consider the end"; part of the dactylic hexameter quidquid agis prudenter agas et respice finem (whatever you do, do it wisely and consider the end) from Gesta Romanorum. Generally a memento mori, a warning to remember one's death. Motto of Homerton College, Cambridge, Trinity College, Kandy, Georgetown College in Kentucky, Turnbull High School, Glasgow, and the London Oratory School.
respondeat superior	let the superior respond	Regarded as a legal maxim in agency law, referring to the legal liability of the principal with respect to an employee. Whereas a hired independent contractor acting tortiously may not cause the principal to be legally liable, a hired employee acting tortiously will cause the principal (the employer) to be legally liable, even if the employer did nothing wrong.
restitutio ad (or in) integrum	restoration to original condition	Principle behind the awarding of damages in common law negligence claims
Restitutor Orbis	Restorer of the world	A title given to Roman Emperor Aurelian after reuniting the Roman Empire in the Crisis of the Third Century.
resurgam	I shall arise	"I shall rise again", expressing Christian faith in resurrection at the Last Day. It appears, among other things, in Charlotte Brontë's Jane Eyre, as the epitaph written on Helen Burns's grave; in a poem of Emily Dickinson: Poems (1955) I. 56 (" 'Arcturus' is his other name"), I slew a worm the other day – A 'Savant' passing by Murmured 'Resurgam' – 'Centipede'! 'Oh Lord – how frail are we'!; and in a letter of Vincent van Gogh. The OED gives "1662 J. Trapp, Annotations upon the Old and New Testament, in five distinct volumes (London, 1662), vol. I, p. 142: "Howbeit he had hope in his death, and might write Resurgam on his grave" as its earliest attribution in the English corpus.
retine vim istam, falsa enim dicam, si coges	Restrain your strength, for if you compel me I will tell lies	An utterance by the Delphic oracle recorded by Eusebius in Praeparatio evangelica, book VI, ch. 5, translated from the Greek of Porphyry (cf. E. H. Gifford's translation) and used by William Wordsworth as a subtitle for his ballad "Anecdote for Fathers".
rex regum fidelum et	king even of faithful kings	Latin motto that appears on the crest of the Trinity Broadcasting Network of Paul and Jan Crouch.
rigor mortis	stiffness of death	The rigidity of corpses when chemical reactions cause the limbs to stiffen about 3–4 hours after death. Other signs of death include drop in body temperature (algor mortis, "cold of death") and discoloration (livor mortis, "bluish color of death").
risum teneatis, amici?	Can you help laughing, friends?	An ironic or rueful commentary, appended following a fanciful or unbelievable tale.
risus abundat in ore stultorum	laughter is abundant in the mouth of fools	excessive and inappropriate laughter signifies stupidity.
Roma invicta	Unconquered Rome	Inspirational motto inscribed on the Statue of Rome.
Roma locuta, causa finita	Rome has spoken, the case is closed	In Roman Catholic ecclesiology, doctrinal matters are ultimately decided by the Vatican.
Romanes eunt domus	People called Romans they go the house	An intentionally garbled Latin phrase from Monty Python's Life of Brian. Its intended meaning is "Romans, go home!", in Latin Romani ite domum.
rorate coeli	drop down ye heavens	a.k.a. The Advent Prose.
rosam quae meruit ferat	She who has earned the rose may bear it	Motto from Sweet Briar College
rus in urbe	A countryside in the city	Generally used to refer to a haven of peace and quiet within an urban setting, often a garden, but can refer to interior decoration.
