= John McLeod Campbell (priest) =

British Christian religious leader

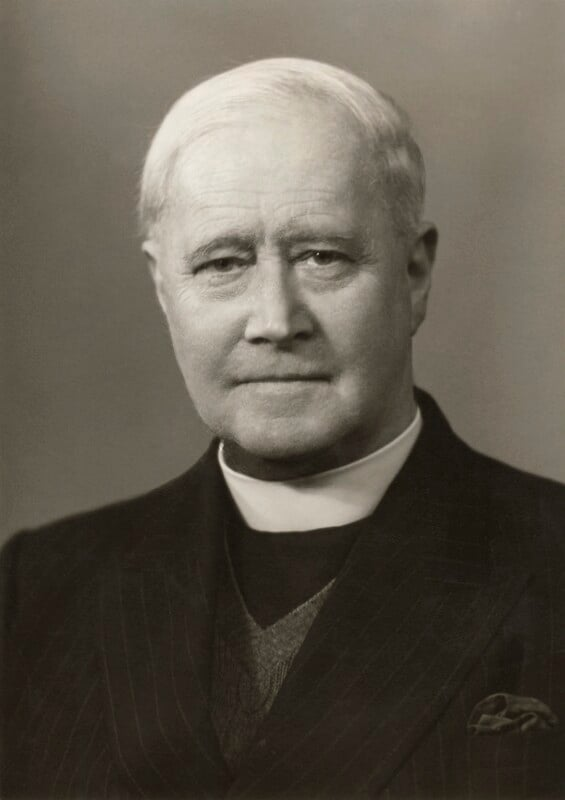
Campbell c. 1950

John McLeod Campbell, MC, QHC (6 July 1884 – 26 February 1961) was an English Anglican priest, chaplain, and missionary. He served as fellow and chaplain of Hertford College, Oxford, from 1909 to 1924, as principal of Trinity College, Kandy from 1924 to 1935, as general secretary of the Overseas Council (formerly the Missionary Council) of the Church Assembly from 1935 to 1953, Master of Charterhouse from 1954 to 1961, and as Chaplain to the Speaker of the House of Commons from 1955 until his death in 1961. He additionally served as a military chaplain during the First World War.

== Early life and education ==
Campbell was born on 6 July 1884 to Donald Campbell, Rector of Oakford, Devon, England.

== Legacy ==
John McLeod Campbell is remembered fondly as a principal of Trinity College, Kandy. The John Mcleod Campbell tower was built as an addition to the Trinity College Chapel and crowned with a centuries old (dated 1660) bell from the St. Mary the Virgin Parish Church in Hemsby. The tower was inaugurated in 1970 and was blessed by the Metropolitan Emeritus, Rev Lakdasa De Mel on August 6th 1972.
