= Sri Piyaratana Tissa Mahanayake Thera =

Sri Lankan Buddhist Monk

- දොඩන්දුවේ ශ්‍රි පියරත්න තිස්ස මහ නායක ස්වාමින් වහන්සේ
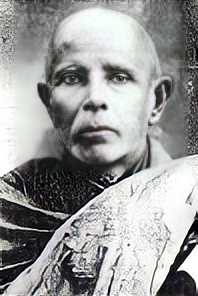
- Sri Piyaratana Tissa Mahanayake Thera

Personal life
- Born: 12 December 1826 Dodanduwa, Ceylon
- Died: 20 May 1907 (aged 80) Dodanduwa
- Known for: Revival of Buddhism; Established Sri Lanka's first Buddhist school (1869); Popularised the 'Poruwa' ceremony at Buddhist weddings.
- Other name: Ven. Dodanduwa Piyaratana Mahanayaka Thera
- Relations: Don David Weerasooriya (brother); Arnolis Weerasooriya (nephew)

Religious life
- Religion: Buddhism
- School: Theravada
- Lineage: Amarapura Nikāya

Sri Piyaratana Tissa Mahanayake Thera (Sinhala: දොඩන්දුවේ ශ්‍රි පියරත්න තිස්ස මහ නායක ස්වාමින් වහන්සේ; 12 December 1826 – 20 May 1907), also known as Dodanduwa Piyaratne Thera, was the Mahanayaka Thera of the Amarapura Nikaya (circa 1860s), and the Sanganayake of the Southern Province. He popularised the 'Poruwa' ceremony at Buddhist weddings.

He established Sri Lanka's first Buddhist school in 1869, Jinalabdhi Vishodaka, now known as Dodanduwa Piyarathana Vidyalaya. He is believed to be the founding father of Buddhist education in Sri Lanka.

He was a member of the Weerasooriya family of Dodanduwa and Hikkaduwa, he was the brother of David Weerasooriya and uncle of Arnolis Weerasooriya.

The Tibetan Monk S. Mahinda was ordained by him. He was also a close friend of Henry Steel Olcott and administered 'Pansil' to him.

== Early life and works ==
Piyaratana Tissa Mahanayake was the son of Don Margiris de Silva Weerasooriya. He was the Chief Monk (Viharadhipathy) at the Gothami Viharaya (Borella), Shaila Bimbaramaya Temple in Dodanduwa , and Mangalaramaya (Beruwela). He established the first Buddhist school in Sri Lanka, Jinalabdhi Vishodaka, located within the premises of Sailabimbaramaya Temple in Dodanduwa. He managed to do this despite the difficulties faced from colonial leaders at the time.

In 1883, he was appointed Head Monk of the Sri Kalyanawansa Chapter. He also formed a Buddhist Society, Lokaratha Sadhana Sangamaya, which became a forefront of safeguarding Buddhist education in the country.

== Founding of Jinalabdhi Vishodaka (Dodanduwa Piyarathana Vidyalaya) ==
In 1869, Piyaratana founded Jinalabdhi Vishodaka, the first Buddhist school in Sri Lanka (also some considered it as the first Buddhist school in the world). It was initially located inside the Sri Swarna Shaila Bimbaramaya Temple in Dodanduwa.

Originally known as Jinalabdhi Vishodaka ("in the love of Buddha"), it was subsequently re-named by Siridhamma Thera; his pupil, successor and the Chief Incumbent of the Temple, following Piyaratana's death.

Olcott contributed in many ways towards this school, financially and in resources, including laboratory equipment. This included an 8-mm projector with film rolls, which is believed to be the first projector brought to Sri Lanka.

== Correspondences with Colonel Olcott ==
Piyaratana exchanged correspondence with Colonel Henry Steel Olcott several years before Olcott arrived in Sri Lanka.

In 1880, Colonel Olcott and Madame Helena Blavatsky arrived at the Galle Harbour, and travelled to the Sailabimbaramaya Temple in Dodanduwa, where they met Piyaratana, to learn about the difficulties faced by Buddhists and their education. 'Pansil' was first administered to Olcott by Piyaratana.

Olcott wrote in his diary:

"Our first state was to Dodanduwa five miles off the seat of the Grand Vihara and Pansala of our friend Piyarathana Tissa Terunnanse, a Monk of erudition, energy and high character. I gave the expected address to 2000 people. After that we visited his temple, which are found scrupulously tidy and well kept an unusual circumstances in the island."

Letters sent by Olcott to Piyarathana can be found in the Library of Sailabimbaramaya Temple. As a result of Piyarathana's efforts, he was conferred an honorary membership of the Theosophical Society, which was based in New York. In 1878 the official document, Akthapatra, certifying his membership, was sent to Piyarathana, signed by Henry Steele Olcott, Helena Blavatsky and Alexander Wilder. It provides the following description:

"Know all to whom these presents may come that Rev. Piyarathana Tissa Therunnanse in recognition of distinguished merit – hath been elected a corresponding fellow by the Theosophical Society in witness whereof the society hath declared the issue of this diploma and its attestation by the hands of its President and Corresponding Secretary. Given at New York in the eighteen hundred and seventy eight." H.P. Blavatsky, Corresponding Secretary, Henry Steel Olcott, President, counter signed: Alexander Wilder, Vice President

Due to their combined efforts, the first Buddhist school was officially registered in 1874, five years after its formation. According to the documents available in the Sailabimbaramaya Temple, Olcott and Blavatsky spent ten days in the temple discussing the revival of Buddhist education. Besides Jinalabdhi Vishodaka, Piyarathana also established several other Buddhist schools, including Upadya Kanishta Vidyalaya at Panadura, the Weligama Buddhist School and similar Buddhist schools in Kathaluwa and Ahangama.

=== Letter between Olcott and Ven. Piyaratana ===
Letter to Dodanduwa Sri Piyaratana Tissa Mahanayake Thera, by Henry Steel Olcott:

I pass among ignorant Western people as a thoroughly well informed man but in comparison with the learning possessed by my Brothers in the oriental priesthoods, I am as ignorant as the last of their neophytes. What I call wisdom is the thorough knowledge of the real truth of the cosmos and of man. Where in Christendom can this be learnt? Where is the University? Where the professor? Where the books from which the hungry student may discover what lies behind the shell of physical natures? That divine knowledge is in the keeping of the temples and priests and ascetics of the East -- of despised heathendom. There alone the way to purification, illumination, power, beatitude can be pointed out. To you and as you must we turn, and say: "Fathers, brothers, the Western world is dying of brutal sensuality and ignorance, come and help, rescue it. Come as missionaries, as teachers, as disputants, preachers. Come prepared to be hated, opposed, threatened, perhaps maltreated. Come expecting nothing but determined to accomplish everything!"

== Death and legacy ==
Piyaratana died on 20 May 1907, aged 80. Following his death his disciple, Ven. Dodanduwe Dammissara Thera, became the administrator of the school and founded an English school in the Sailabimbarama Temple premises.

The Postal Ministry issued a postal stamp valued at 60 cents on 22 May 1984 commemorating Piyaratana Thera.

== See also ==
- Sri Lankan Buddhism
- Weligama Sri Sumangala
- Hikkaduwe Sri Sumangala Thera
- Ratmalane Sri Dharmaloka Thera
- Migettuwatte Gunananda Thera

Buddhist titles
Preceded by N/A	Supreme Mahanayaka of Amarapura Nikaya circa 1860s	Succeeded by N/A
