= R. W. Ryde =

English Anglican clergyman (1866–1909)

Rev. R. W. Ryde
- Born: Robert William Ryde New Cross, Kent
- Died: 8 August 1909 (aged 43); Colombo, Ceylon
- Education: Jesus College, Cambridge
- Occupations: Clergyman, Principal of Trinity College, Kandy

Reverend Robert William Ryde (6 July 1866 – 8 August 1909) was an English clergyman and member of the Church Missionary Society (CMS). He was Principal of Trinity College, Kandy, Sri Lanka and St. John's College, Jaffna. The Ryde Gold Medal, awarded in Trinity College to the best all round boy, and the highest honour that the School can bestow, is named after Rev. Ryde.

== Early life and education ==
Ryde was born in New Cross, Kent, the son of Charles Ryde, who worked in the cotton industry, and Mary Ann Ryde (née Turner). He grew up in Greenwich and was educated in Blackheath and Jesus College, Cambridge, earning his B.A. in 1888 and M.A. in 1895. He was ordained as a deacon in 1895. He taught classics at Monkton Combe School before travelling to Sri Lanka (then Ceylon) with the CMS.

== Career in Ceylon ==
Rev. Ryde took over as Vice Principal of Trinity in 1895. He married Miss E M Loveridge in 1897, and left in 1899 for St John's, Jaffna as Principal, with Rev A.A. Pilson filling his vacancy at Kandy. Upon the resignation of Principal Rev Napier-Clavering in 1900, Ryde returned to Trinity College as Principal. He held this post for a brief 2 years, leaving in 1902, but the impression he left on the boys of the era was a lasting one. His stint in Jaffna was also marked by the latter feature, so much so that he was invited to assume duty as President of the St John's College Old Boys' Association in 1904, and that of the Trinity OBA (Colombo) in 1908.

Following his period at Trinity, Rev Ryde took charge of the Sinhalese Women Teachers Vernacular Training School, in Cotta, Colombo. He was preparing to move his family to the mission house in Anuradhapura to assume duties at St. Andrews Church when he was taken ill. Rev Ryde died in Colombo in 1909.

== Legacy ==
His loss was felt deeply in both Trinity and St John's. The Colombo OBA of Trinity College has been honouring his name since by presenting the Ryde Gold Medal. It is also recorded by the St. John's OBA that in 1910 the late Dr. S. V. Vairakiam offered to present annually a medal, in memory of the late Rev. R. W. Ryde, M. A., who was Principal of the College in 1899, to the boy who stood first in order of merit in the College in the Cambridge Senior Local examination. The medal was called the "Ryde Medal" and bore a splendid impress of the likeness of Mr. Ryde.

== See also ==
- The Ryde Gold Medal
- Trinity College, Kandy
- St. John's College, Jaffna
