= David Paynter (artist) =

Sri Lankan painter

David Paynter RA OBE
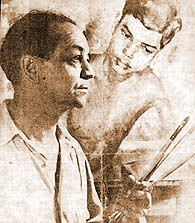
- Portrait photograph of Paynter (c. 1965)
- Born: David Shillingford Paynter; 5 March 1900; Almora, India
- Died: 7 June 1975 (aged 75); Sri Lanka
- Resting place: Union Church Cemetery, Nuwara Eliya
- Education: Trinity College, Kandy, Royal Academy; Heywood Institute of Art
- Occupations: Artist; Teacher
- Notable work: Murals at Trinity College Chapel; Chapel of the Transfiguration, S. Thomas' College, Mount Lavinia, Portrait of Ivor Jennings
- Relatives: Arnolis Weerasooriya (uncle)

David Shillingford Paynter RA OBE (5 March 1900 – 7 June 1975), was an internationally renowned Sri Lankan painter. He was a pioneer creator of a Sri Lankan idiom in what was essentially a Western art form. His most celebrated works are his murals at the Trinity College Chapel in Kandy and the Chapel of the Transfiguration, at S. Thomas' College, Mount Lavinia. The Sri Lanka Philatelic Bureau commemorated Christmas in 1996 with two stamps featuring the murals from the Trinity Chapel.

== Early life ==
David's father, Arthur Stephen Paynter, was born in Bicester in Oxfordshire, where his family owned several breweries. Arthur married Anagi Weerasooriya, sister of Arnolis Weerasooriya, from the south of Sri Lanka. His parents were both members of the Salvation Army and worked in India, who after a number of years left in order to start the India Christian Mission. His parents moved to Ceylon in 1904, where they started a mission in Nuwara Eliya. Paynter had his primary education at Breeks Memorial School in India, and his secondary education at Trinity College, Kandy.

Apart from the basic guidance he received at Trinity, he had no formal art lessons. Yet Paynter entered the Royal Academy by winning a five-year scholarship in the open competition with students, many of whom received formal instruction in European art schools.

== Paynter and the Royal Academy ==
Paynter won the Royal Academy Gold Medal at the end of the fourth year along with the Edward Stott Travelling Scholarship which gave him two years in Italy. In 1936, he visited London for the third time – a productive and rewarding period in his art career. His one-man exhibition at the Wertheim Gallery in London brought him much recognition from art critics and journals in Europe. By invitation he participated in four international exhibitions in the Carnegie Institute in Pittsburg in Rome, in New Delhi and at the World Fair held in New York. From 1923 to 1940 his paintings were exhibited every year at the Royal Academy in London. The themes of most of his early works are religious. In 1923 two of his best pictures The Triumphal Entry into Jerusalem and the Entombment were considered powerful and dramatic statements of deeply felt religious experiences.

== Trinity College years ==
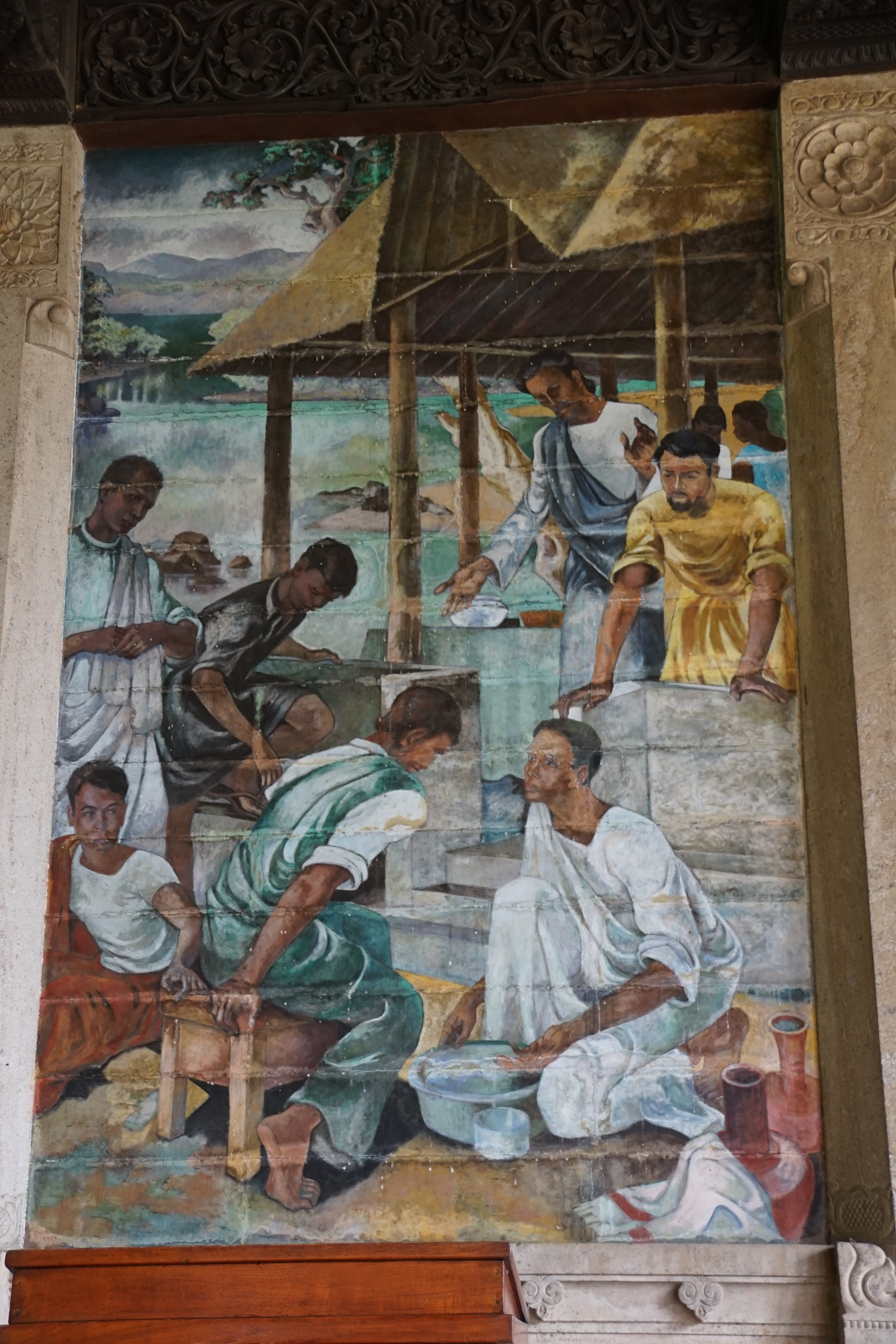
"Washing the Disciples Feet", a mural in Trinity College Chapel, Kandy

In 1925, he returned to Sri Lanka and started work on the Trinity College Chapel murals. The Trinity Chapel was a monumental work of architecture exemplifying the core vision that Paynter shared – a European world view rooted in the vernacular of the land. Nothing of its type had even been imagined in the 1920s. The Independence Memorial Hall in Colombo – which borrowed heavily from the Trinity Chapel design – would not be created for another quarter century. Thus, in Rev Gaster's timeless design, Paynter found the ideal setting for his masterwork.

Work on the chapel began in 1923. By 1929, the side chapel was erected, and Paynter began work on his first mural. His murals in the chapel, which comprise 'Are Ye Able', 'Washing the Disciples' Feet', 'The Good Samaritan' and 'The Crucifixion', are Bible stories transferred to Ceylon people and scenery. By 1935, all the murals were complete, with the centrepiece being a massive depiction of The Crucifixion – Christ as a dark-skinned, clean-shaven native of the land, raised on his cross above the dusky gloom of a sullen swarm of mangroves.

Paynter found time during his years at Trinity to work on numerous portraits, many of which may be seen in the college library; he also lent his talent to the creation of many set designs for plays.

== Later life, works ==
Paynter gradually turned his hand to another branch of art – portraiture. Here he was very successful. To be painted by Paynter became the fashion of the day. His clients ranged the elite of Sri Lanka, to British Governors to the Prime Ministers of Sri Lanka. On invitation in 1954 he painted the official portrait of Jawaharlal Nehru, then Prime Minister of India, whose portrait hangs in the Prime Minister's residence in Delhi, and Mahatma Gandhi whose portrait is in the Law College in Colombo. Another aspect of Paynter's art was his presentation of male beauty in his male nudes and semi-nudes. Paynter's portrait of Sir John Kotelawala is in the Jayawardenapura Kotte Parliament; that of Sir Ivor Jennings in the Peradeniya University Campus; and another of Dr. R. L. Spittel entitled 'Surgeon in the Wilderness' in the possession of his daughter.

When an exhibition of contemporary Christian art from all countries was held in Rome in 1951 to commemorate the Holy Year celebrations, Pope Pius XII is said to have asked for Paynter's work. In 1940 Paynter was appointed Director of the College of Fine Arts in Colombo, and served in that capacity for several years. During that period he was made a distinguished citizen and honoured with the Order of the British Empire.

== Last years ==
Apart from his painting, Paynter was also involved in the social service work of the Paynters Homes for orphan children in Nuwara Eliya, which was started by his father. David commenced the Salt Spring Farm at Kumburupiddi near Trincomalee, in 1962 to settle boys from Paynter's Homes, and moved there permanently to settle as a farmer. In 1968 took up his palette to complete his final masterpiece – the mural known as 'The Transfiguration' at the chapel of St Thomas' College, Mt. Lavinia.

Paynter died of a heart attack on 7 June 1975 and was buried in the Union Church cemetery in Nuwara Eliya.
