= Trinity College Chapel, Kandy =

Holy Trinity Chapel
- Holy Trinity Chapel of Trinity College, Kandy.
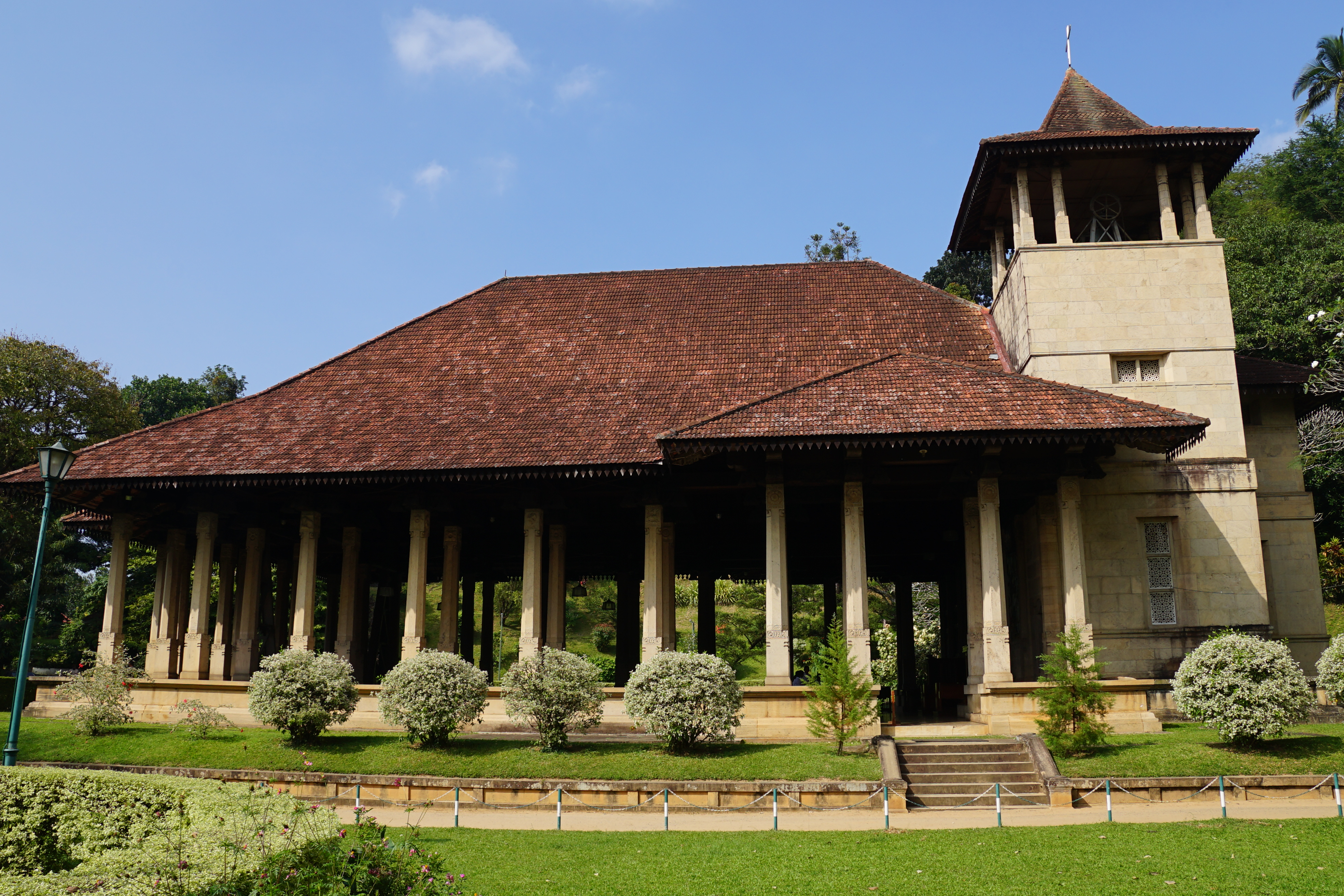
- Holy Trinity Chapel
- 7.30035°N 80.63829°E
- Location: Kandy
- Country: Sri Lanka
- Language: English
- Denomination: Church of Ceylon
- Religious order: Anglicanism
- Churchmanship: Central churchmanship
- Website: trinitycollege.lk/chapel

History
- Status: Active
- Dedication: Holy Trinity
- Dedicated: 3 March 1935; 91 years ago

Architecture
- Functional status: Active Collegiate Chapel
- Architect: Lewis John Gaster
- Architectural type: Chapel
- Style: Traditional Sinhalese
- Groundbreaking: 1922; 104 years ago

Administration
- Metropolis: Church of England
- Diocese: Diocese of Kurunegala

Clergy
- Archbishop: Justin Welby
- Bishop: Keerthisiri Fernando

The Trinity College Chapel ("Holy Trinity Church") in Kandy, Sri Lanka is one of the more distinctive church buildings in Sri Lanka. It is situated below the Principal's bungalow at Trinity College, Kandy. The chapel is one of the first and finest examples of the application of indigenous architecture in the design of an Anglican church in the country. The building is modelled on traditional Buddhist architecture, reminiscent of those found in Polonnaruwa, an ancient capital of Sri Lanka, in that it is an open building with a lofty hipped roof supported by numerous carved stone pillars.

== History ==
In 1918 the school principal of Trinity College, Alexander Garden Fraser (1873-1962) commenced planning for the construction of a chapel, identifying a site within the school grounds. Fraser was the principal of Trinity College between 1904 and 1924. He played a pivotal role in the development of Trinity College from a small provincial school to a national college. The vice principal, Lewis John Gaster (1879-1939), who joined the school in 1910, a qualified architect and draughtsman, prepared the plans for the chapel. Gaster went on to become the principal at King's College in Uganda.

The foundation stone was laid by Foss Westcott, the Metropolitan of India, Burma and Ceylon on 19 August 1922, as part of the school's fiftieth-anniversary celebrations. The original foundation stone of the chapel was laid in front of the main hall, where the car park now stands and was later moved to the outside wall of the chapel, where it can still be seen today.

The construction of the chapel, which commenced in early 1923 and took over twelve years to complete, was overseen by staff members, K. L. B. Tennekoon and H. W. Mediwake.

During construction, nearly 100 craftsmen and labourers were employed. In 1929 the side chapel was the first section to be completed. David Paynter, OBE (1900-1975), a staff member of the college painted the first mural on the southern wall of the side chapel in 1928. In 1930 the side chapel was dedicated as the "Chapel of the Light of the World".

Following the completion of the side chapel, the main chapel and the sanctuary were constructed. These works were completed in 1933 upon which Paynter painted a further mural above the main altar.

The chapel was formally dedicated on 3 March 1935.

In 1954 the original corrugated zinc roof sheets were replaced with calicut tiles, during the course of the re-roofing the murals above the pulpit and lectern were badly damaged. Paynter subsequently repainted these murals, completing the work in 1957.

== Architecture ==
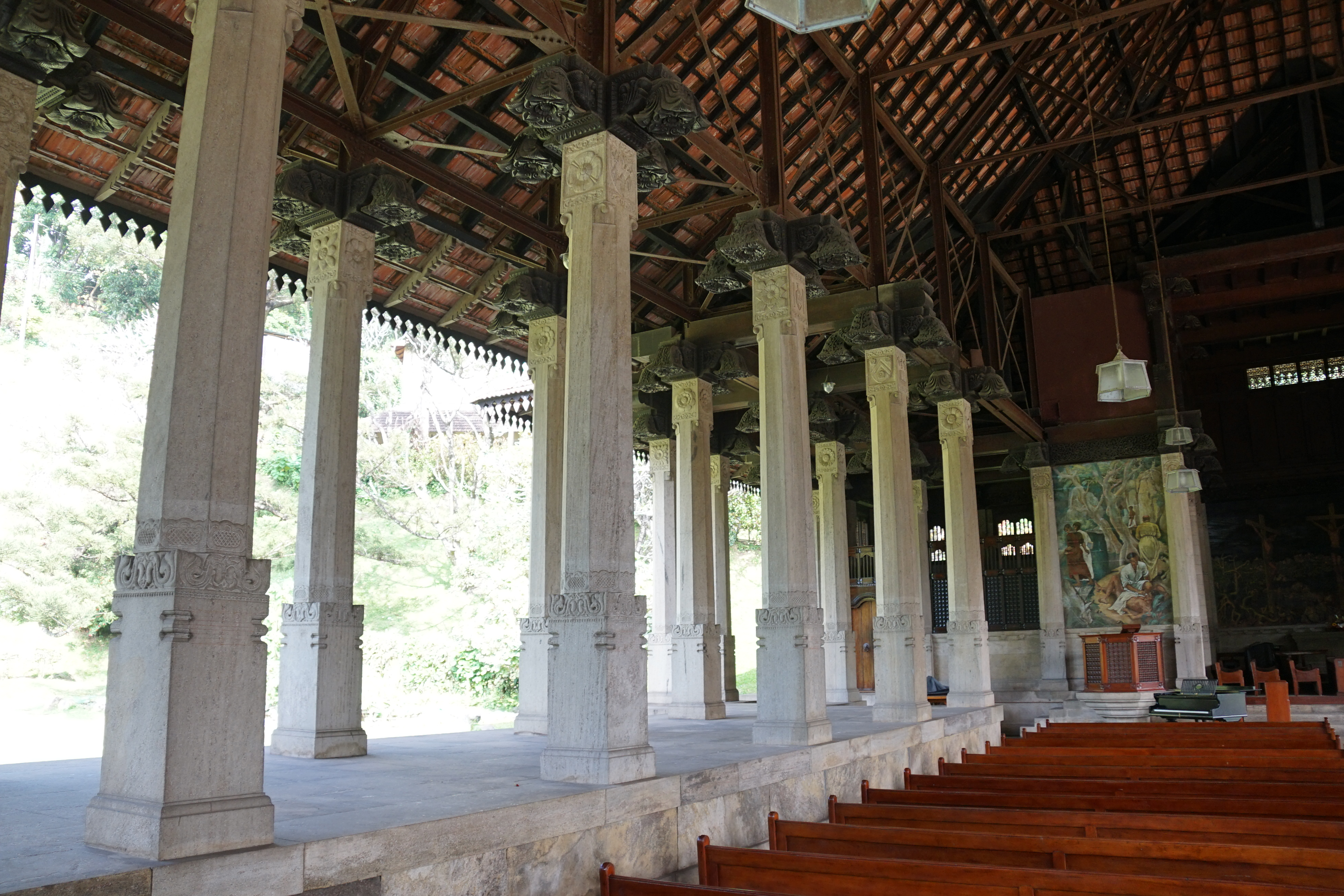
The interior of Trinity College Chapel, Kandy

At the time when most Europeans were content to build churches in their own Gothic style, Gaster deliberately sought inspiration from the local Sinhalese architecture. Prototypes for the Church are to be found at the Royal Audience Hall, Magul Maduwa (Celebration Hall), of the Kingdom of Kandy (built in 1783 by Sri Rajadhi Rajasinha) and the 14th century Embekka Devalaya Shrine near Kandy. The first example of the use of traditional architectural design in Christian churches, also involved both Rev. Fraser and Rev. Gaster was the chapel at the Peradeniya Training Colony, however similar to the Magul Maduwa and the Embekka Shrine the pillars of this chapel are made of wood.

=== Pillars ===
The creation of the stone pillars was supervised by K. L. Siripala, a famous stonemason of the time, to be shaped and carved. Other stone carvers were also brought to Sri Lanka, especially for the purpose of carving the pillars for the chapel. The carvings on the windows of the side of the chapel were done by local craftsmen.

The fifty-four pillars are made of granite quarried in Aruppola, 4 kilometres (2.5 mi) away. Some, in the chancel, are built-in sections, but most have been hewn out of single blocks (5.5 metres (18 ft) long and 0.9 metres (3.0 ft) square), each of which weighing about 3 metric tons (3.0 t) before carving. The blocks were then hauled up to the college on a trolley by a pair of elephants. The first pillars to be erected, those by the pulpit and the south entrance, were fully carved at the quarry before being transported. The remainder were carved at the site of the chapel.

Each pillar is 4.9 metres (16 ft) in height and 0.6 metres (2.0 ft) square, they are square-based and square capped, with a gently tapering stem, octagonal in shape. Four of the pillars at the northern entrance carry carvings of the 'four beasts' of Revelation. The pillars are surmounted by four pekadas, made of a tough local wood called Gummalu. Each pekada, designed by Bezalel Navaratne, when viewed from below, has been carved to represent an inverted lotus. Many of the beams which the pillars support were also carved by local craftsman. The capitals on ten of the pillars facing the nave are carved with the coats of arms of following British schools and colleges, which made financial donations towards the cost of the chapel: Balliol College, Oxford, Eton College, Marlborough College, Hertford College, Oxford, New College, Oxford, Wellington College, Berkshire, Rossall School, Winchester College, Repton School, Dulwich College.

=== Roof ===
The roof of the chapel is in the style of a traditional Kandy-style double-pitched roof. It starts at a height of 6 metres (20 ft) and peaks at a height of 16.75 metres (55.0 ft) above the central aisle. The chapel was originally roofed in corrugated zinc roof sheets but these were replaced in 1954 with calicut tiles.

=== The Side Chapel ===
The side chapel, entered from the north transept, was named by the then principal, Rev. McLeod Campbell as "the Chapel of the Light of the World". It was the first part of the chapel to be completed and was formally dedicated on 23 March 1930.

The door and frame are typical Kandyan work. The whole of the south wall of this chapel is covered with an early painting by David Paynter depicting the Mother of James and John making a request to Jesus on behalf of her two sons. The chapel is rich in stone and wood carving. The screen and the grape and the chalice design on the altar were both made by local craftsmen from the original drawings by Gaster. The windows are typical Kandyan, the vertical bars are made of wood and painted with lacquer. The grill on the east was carved locally from a slab of Swedish green marble, like the grills on the sanctuary of the main chapel.

=== The Murals ===
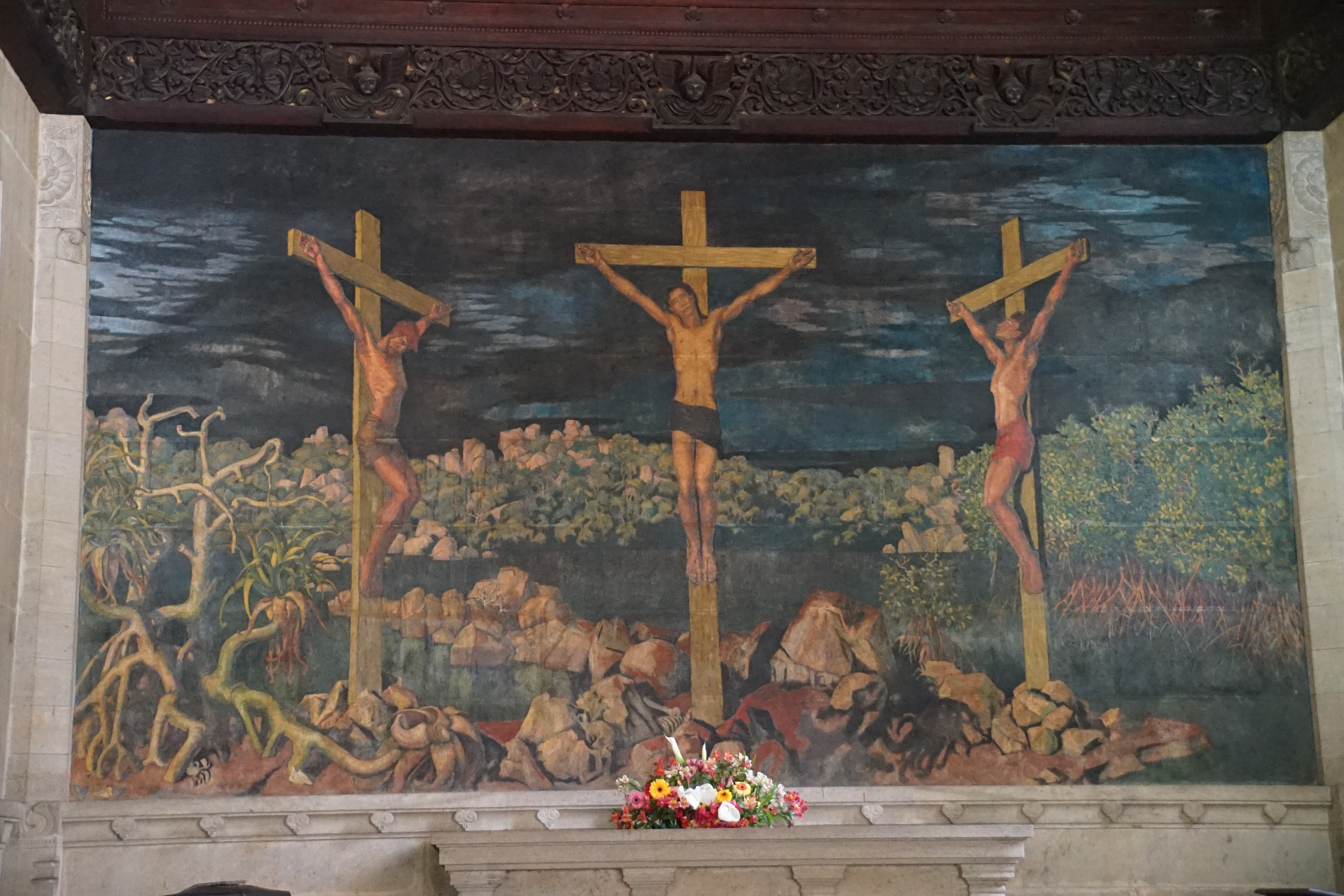
"The Crucifixion", by David Paynter (1933)

The four murals were the work of the Sri Lankan artist David Paynter, once a member of the staff. Like the chapel itself, they were revolutionary when conceived, in that they portrayed biblical stories a Sri Lankan setting.

- "Are Ye Able" located in the side chapel: This mural was painted in 1928, shortly after Paynter had returned from studying art in Europe. It conveys something of a lush vegetarian characteristic of parts of Sri Lanka which so impressed him on his return from Italy. In it, the mother of James and John kneels before Jesus of Nazareth, who is clothed in a yellow robe and asks him to give her two sons, standing on either side of Jesus, the chief places in his kingdom.
- "The Crucifixion" located above the altar: In this mural, painted in 1933, Paynter has set the crucifixion, with a beardless Christ on a cross, in a mangrove swamp, such as is to be found on the east coast of Sri Lanka.
- "The Good Samaritan" located above the pulpit: The mural on the north side, painted in 1957, replaced an earlier one on the same subject. It depicts the parable of the Good Samaritan.
- "Washing the Disciples Feet" located above the lectern: The mural, painted in 1965, replaced an earlier one on the same subject that was damaged when the roof of the chapel was replaced.

=== Bell Tower ===
Construction of the bell tower commenced in 1965, with the donation of ten slabs by Barney Raymond, an Old Boy. The tower was dedicated on the 8 December 1969, in memory of Rev. Cannon John McLeod Campbell, by Rev. Lakdasa De Mel, the first Bishop of Kurunegala. The bell was received from a parish church in Hemsby in 1971.

== Services and events ==
Weekly devotions of students at Trinity College during school term, and services on Sunday mornings are held at the chapel. It is also well known for the musical events held there. Nine Lessons and Carols in Advent, and The Cross & Triumph of Christ in Lent by the Trinity College choir and other events are held during the year.

== See also ==
- Trinity College, Kandy
- The Choir of Trinity College, Kandy
- Kandy
- Church of Ceylon
