= Union Church, Nuwara Eliya =

Coordinates: 6°58′25.4″N 80°46′8.5″E

- Union Church, Nuwara Eliya
- Location: Old Uddpussalawa Road, Nuwara Eliya, Sri Lanka
- Denomination: India Christian Mission Church

History
- Consecrated: 1906

Architecture
- Functional status: Active

Administration
- Diocese: Sri Lanka

Clergy
- Vicar: L. S. Joshua

Archaeological Protected Monument of Sri Lanka
- Designated: 17 May 2013

Union Church, is an interdenominational church, located on Old Uddpussalawa Road in Nuwara Eliya. The church is administered by the India Christian Mission Church, headquartered at Eluru, India.

The church was founded by Rev. Arthur Stephen Paynter in 1906 and was the first church in Nuwara Eliya that was open to all races.

Paynter, was born 8 July 1862 in Bicester, Oxfordshire, England, where his father was a church warden. In 1881 he joined the Salvation Army and traveled to India as a missionary. He traveled throughout India and Ceylon, becoming a Colonel and was in-charge of the Salvation Army in Ceylon. In 1893 Paynter married Anagi (Agnes) Louisa Weerasooriyaa (1863–1962), the daughter of David Weerasooriyaa, from Dodanduwa. She had previously joined the Salvation Army on 1 August 1884. They both worked in India and after a few years they resigned from the Salvation Army, over the Army's refusal to admit non-Europeans to its ranks, founding the India Christian Mission (Raj-i-Masih) on 1 November 1897 in Almora District of then Uttar Pradesh State. They moved to Ceylon in 1904, and decided to start a mission in Nuwara Eliya. They had four children, Evangeline, Arnold (b. 1897), Ava Averil and David (b.1900). Arnold continued his father's missionary work and in 1924 established the Nuwara Eliya Children's Home (later renamed "The Paynter Home"), for orphaned children, and David was an internationally renowned painter, who received an OBE. The Paynters log constructed the church as a place of worship for Methodists, Baptists, Presbyterians, members of the Dutch Reformed Church, Scots Kirk, Church of South India and the Salvation Army. Paynter died on 27 July 1933.

The church continues to function as an interdenominational church, with ministers supplied by the Methodist Church in Sri Lanka.

On 17 May 2013 the building was formally recognised by the Government as an Archaeological Protected Monument.
