= Arnolis Weerasooriya =

Colonel of the Salvation Army

Colonel Arnolis Weerasooriya
- අර්නෝලිස් වීරසූරිය
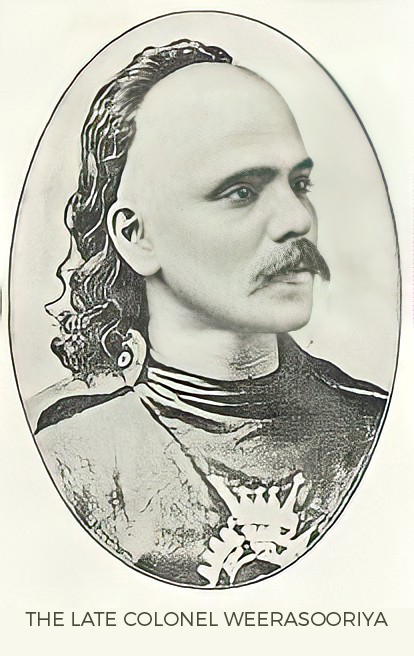

Personal details
- Born: Arnolis (Arnold) Alexander Weerasooriya; 20 September 1854 Dodanduwa, Ceylon
- Died: 18 May 1888 (aged 33) Bombay, India
- Relations: David Paynter (nephew); Sri Piyaratana Tissa Mahanayake Thero (uncle)
- Parents: Don David Weerasooriya (father); Dona Maria (née Jayawardene) (mother)
- Education: Trinity College, Kandy
- Occupation: Salvation Army Officer

Military service
- Allegiance: Sri Lanka
- Years of service: 1883 - 1888
- Rank: Colonel

Arnolis (Arnold) Alexander Weerasooriya (Sinhala :අර්නෝලිස් වීරසූරිය; 20 September 1854 – 18 May 1888) was the first Ceylonese Colonel of the Salvation Army, also serving as Second in Command of the Indian sub-continent 1887–1888. He was a member of the Weerasooriya family of Dodanduwa and Hikkaduwa, and he is understood to be the first Sinhalese member of the Salvation Army.

== Early life and education ==
Weerasooriya was born 20 September c. 1854/1857 in Dodanduwa, Ceylon. He was the third son of Don David Weerasooriya (1824-1911), and Dona Maria née Jayawardene (1833-1922), coming from a family of five sons (including Arnolis) and seven daughters. His sister, Agnes, was the mother of David Paynter, an internationally renowned Sri Lankan painter, and his uncle was Sri Piyaratana Tissa Mahanayake Thero. Weerasooriya was a bright student; he studied at Trinity College, Kandy and went on to become a teacher at the college, where every Sunday he would take school boarders to St. Paul's Church, Kandy for morning and evening services.

Arnolis's father, Don David had been known as an Arachchi, just as his father Don Johannes de Silva Weerasooriya, who was also a Patabendi Arachchi and a police officer. More so, Don David had also been responsible in helping build the Dodanduwa bridge. Don David Weerasooriya and his cousin Alexander Theodore Weerasooriya, a Proctor and a member of the Galle Municipal Council, donated the land and buildings for the Holy Trinity Church, Patuwatha, which was consecrated on the 22 October 1875.

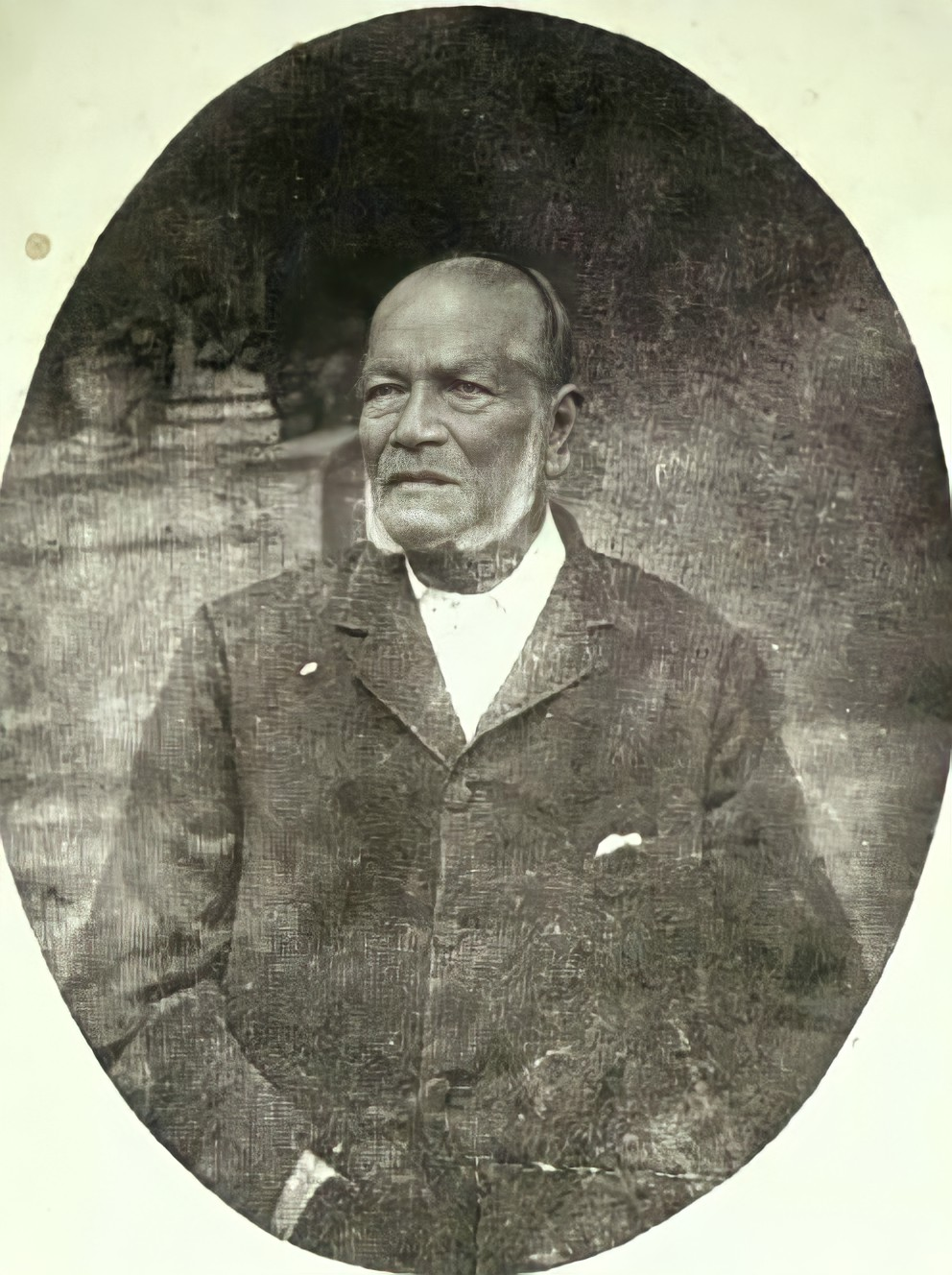
Arnolis's father - Don David Weerasooriya

Arnolis's sister, Agnes, was the mother of David Paynter, an internationally renowned Sri Lankan painter, and his uncle was Sri Piyaratana Tissa Mahanayake Thero, the Maha Nayaka Thero of the Amarapura Nikaya. Weerasooriya was a bright student; he studied at Trinity College, Kandy and went on to become a teacher at the college, where every Sunday he would take school boarders to St. Paul's Church, Kandy for morning and evening services.

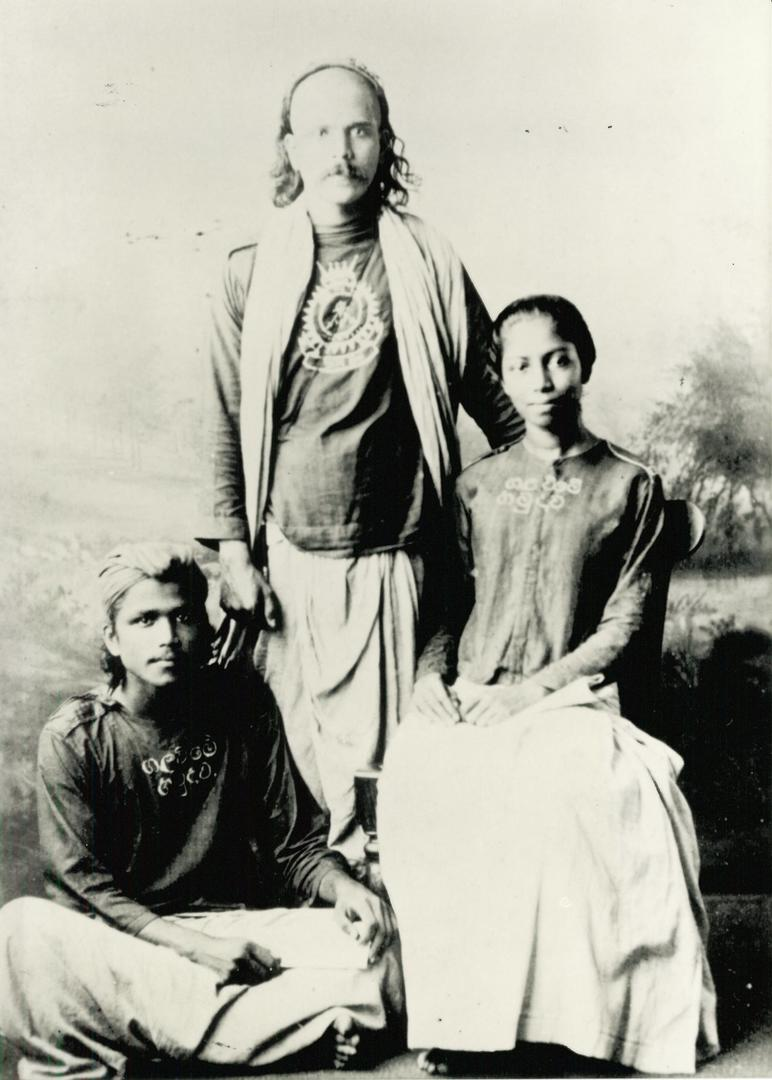
Arnolis next to his brother and sister, wearing the Salvation Army outfit

=== Conversion experience ===
Whilst a student at Trinity College, Weerasooriya was hoping to train as a barrister when he met Captain William Gladwin of the Salvation Army who was preaching in Kandy at the time.

In Weerasooriya's words, "It changed my life": instead of pursuing a career in law, he opted to follow a calling to serve the Lord Jesus Christ.

== Career ==
Although he kept company with Gladwin, Weerasooriya was warned by the Principal of Trinity College that he would be expelled from school, due to his influence on students. The principal went to the extent of writing to his father, a devout Christian, yet Weerasooriya could not be held back from his goal of serving Christ. Gladwin and Weerasooriya together preached the gospel throughout the island. Weerasooriya was by now an icon who inspired many other Salvationists throughout the world.

Weerasooriya eventually went to Chennai, India to begin training as an officer before entering the training home in Bombay in November 1883. Following his training, he was selected to accompany Commissioner Frederick Booth-Tucker, the leader of the Salvation Army in India, going on tours of Gujarat and Ceylon. In November 1883, dedicated to his work in the Salvation Army, he wrote to his father in Ceylon: “I am just now closely attached to the Major Booth-Tucker of the Army. That good man has to do a great work.”

William Booth, the founder of the Salvation Army, invited Weerasooriya, along with Booth-Tucker, to London for the first International Congress of the Salvation Army, held May–June 1886.

The presence and the testimony of Weerasooriya had an impact, resulting in a hundred missionaries volunteering to go to the East, travelling by ship with Weerasooriya and Booth-Tucker. Weerasooriya travelled often to other countries including England but his heart was for service in India. Dedicated to his work in the Lord, Weerasooriya rose within the ranks of the Salvation Army and was an inspiration to and a courageous member of the Indian church. In 1887 he returned to England to encourage and inspire yet another larger group of missionaries, known as the 'Jubilee Fifty.' In the summer of 1887, on Weerasooriya's second visit to London, General William Booth promoted him to the rank of Colonel, appointing Weerasooriya as second-in-command of the Salvation Army's forces in India for the whole Indian territory. This gave him a legitimate rank and place within the Salvation Army, which also included duties such as managing funds, and considerable authority in the hierarchy.

Booth-Tucker recalled: "This was in itself an unheard of step in the history of Indian missions. Here was a native of the country actually appointed to take charge of our European missionaries, and instead of the latter having complete control of the funds, as has hitherto invariably been the case, a native was placed in charge of the war chest, and had the control of expenditure of our Indian funds".

Within a week of being appointed, Weerasooriya sent Booth-Tucker a telegram requesting reinforcements as he had many new converts and people from neighboring villages wanting the Salvationists to visit. The two continued in their pursuits throughout India, steering many revival meetings.

Weerasooriya is credited with the establishment of the Salvation Army in his home country of Ceylon. His work and dedication to the causes of serving Christ made him popular among the people. His commitment resulted in the organization being recognised and accepted broadly. In his southern home town, there were several new converts eager to serve with him within a mere 4–5 weeks.

== Death ==
Shortly after returning to India with the Jubilee Fifty, Weerasooriya went on to serve cholera patients with little regard to his own safety. Hearing of a missionary with cholera, he travelled to Bombay, where he became infected himself.

He told the Salvationists gathered round his deathbed "It's nice to see you all, but are you not neglecting your work?", and even called his secretary as though he was going to work on something. His final request for those gathered around him was to sing his favourite hymn: "Blessed Lord, in Thee is Refuge;" and, despite his frailty, he joined them in singing the Chorus "I will trust Thee, I will trust Thee, all my Life Thou shalt control." He died a few minutes later on 18 May 1888, at the age of 29. He was buried in the Sewri Christian Cemetery in Mumbai. The memorial stone records his final words, perhaps in delirium, imagining he was concluding a letter: "Yours for the salvation of India."

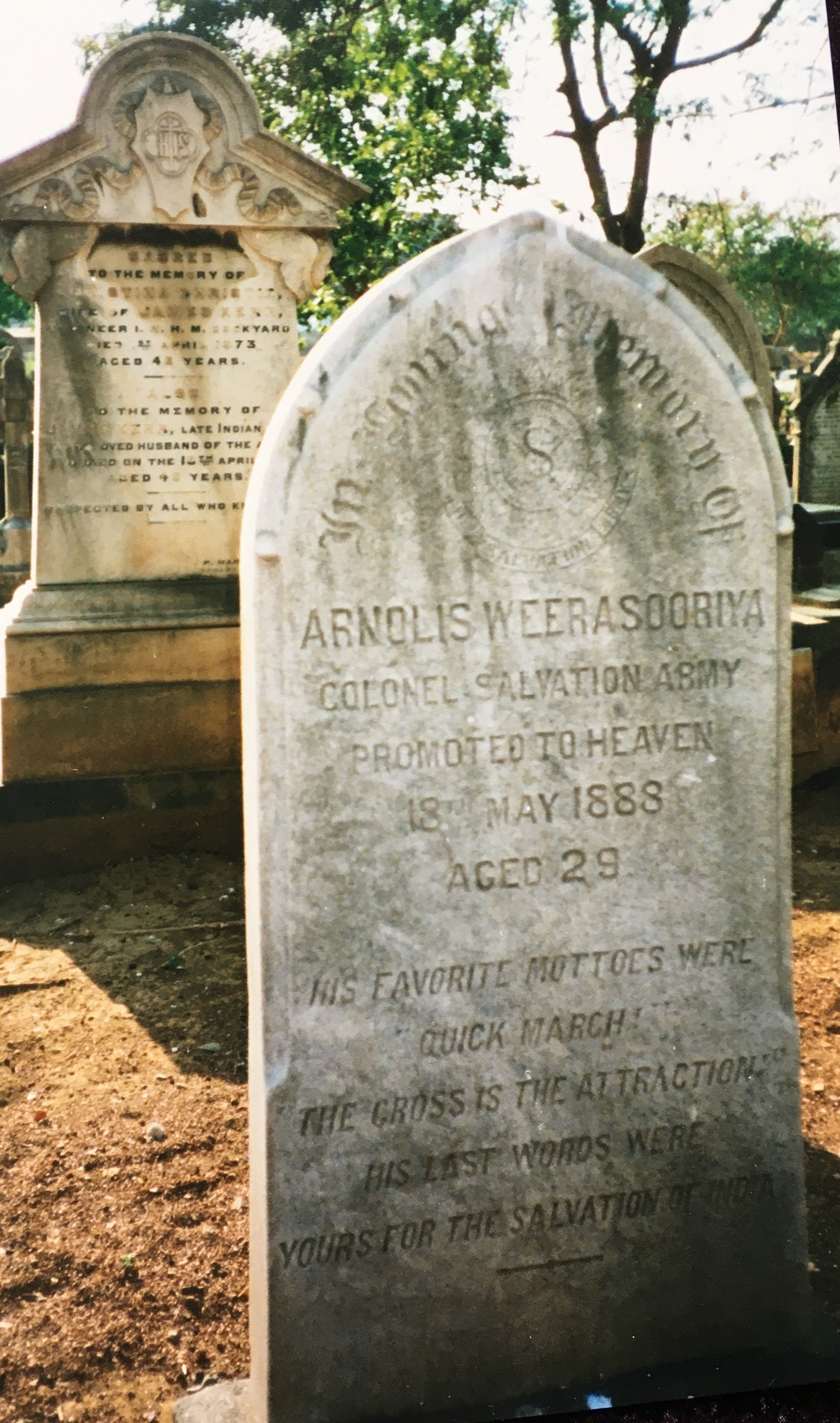
Memorial Arnolis Weerasooriya, Sewri Cemetery, Mumbai.

Weerasooriya left behind a powerful legacy. It is well accepted that Weerasooriya achieved much within his short life span. He was and is an inspiration for those seeking to serve God in India and the rest of Asia. A memorial article published by the Salvation Army included the following: “By Indians and Europeans alike he was looked upon as almost more than mortal, while to our officers and soldiers he was a constant inspiration and a pillar of strength.” Thus, he continued to serve as an important symbol and motivational tool for the Salvation Army in India and Sri Lanka.
