= Redde rationem =

The Latin phrase redde rationem, literally translated, means to give an account. It is taken from the Gospel of Luke 16:2.

The evangelist tells of a rich man who had entrusted the management of his assets to an administrator. When he heard rumors that the manager was wasting the money entrusted to him, he called the manager to his presence and asked him to account for its actions, saying: "redde rationem villicationis Tuae: iam enim non poteris villicare" (give an account of thy stewardship; for thou mayest be no longer steward).

In standard Italian, is used as a synonym for a showdown, as for example in the sentence: "Siamo giunti al (we have reached the) redde rationem!".

== See also ==
- Latin phrases
