= Tilak Weerasooriya =

Sri Lankan physician and academic (1950–2022)

Tilak R. Weerasooriya
- තිලක් රිචඩ් වීරසූරිය
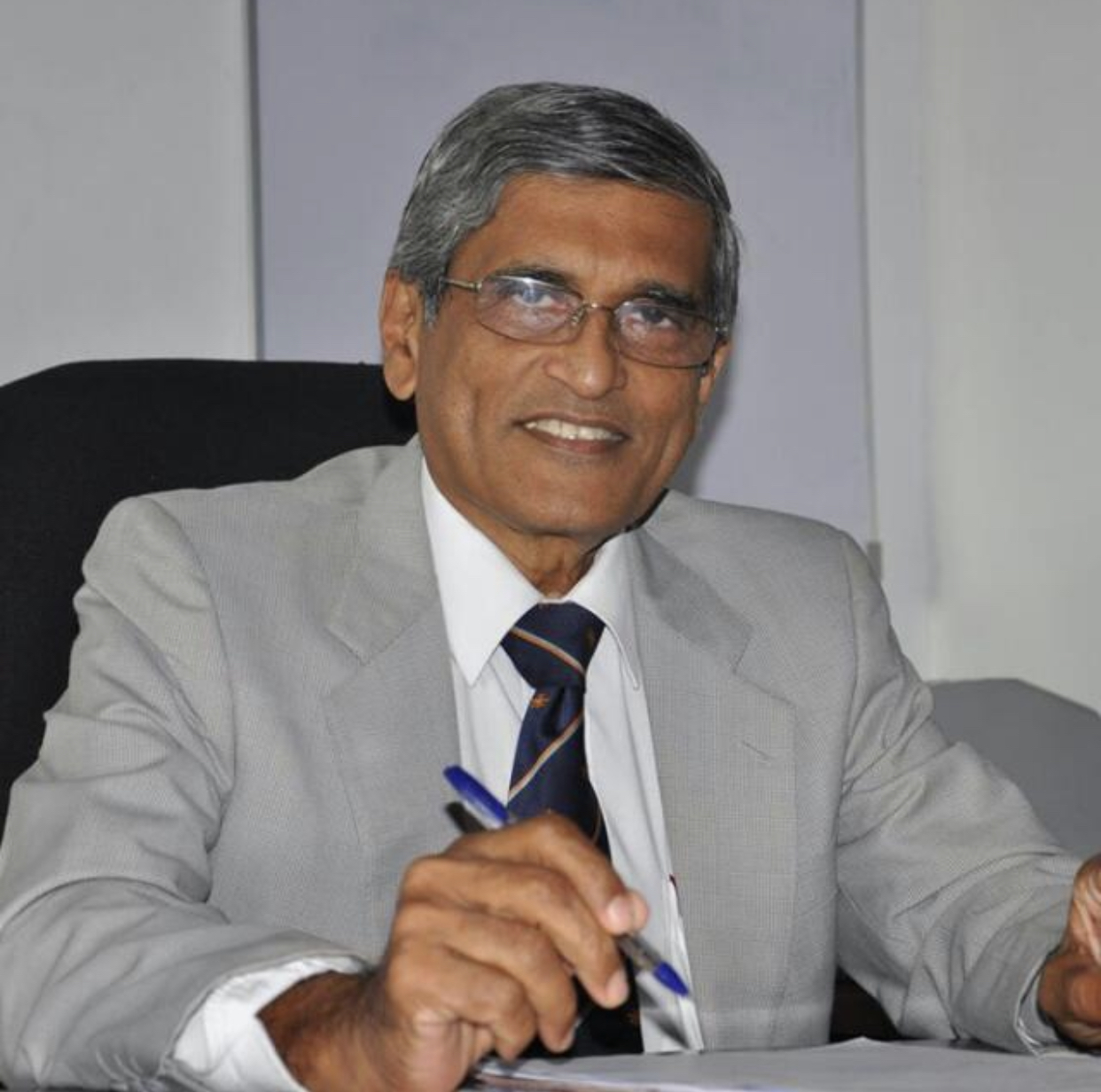
- Born: Tilak Richard Weerasooriya; 20 November 1950; Gampola, Sri Lanka
- Died: 20 February 2022 (aged 71); Galle, Sri Lanka
- Education: Richmond College, Galle; University of Peradeniya; Kyushu University
- Known for: Fertility, andrology
- Spouse: Mirani Weerasooriya (m. 1980)
- Children: 3
- Scientific career
- Thesis: Micro vasculature of the testis, using electron microscopy (1984/85)
- Scientific career
- Fields: Anatomy; Andrology; Fertility
- Workplaces: University of Peradeniya; Kyushu University; University of Ruhuna; Kotelawala Defence University

Tilak Richard Weerasooriya (Sinhala :තිලක් රිචඩ් වීරසූරිය) (20 November 1950 – 20 February 2022) was a Sri Lankan physician, academic, and professor emeritus. He was a pioneer in the field of Andrology in Sri Lanka. He served as Dean of the medical faculties at the University of Ruhuna Faculty of Medicine and the General Sir John Kotelawala Defence University, becoming the only Sri Lankan medical academic to lead two medical faculties, as per a SLJMS appreciation.

He was also a Senior Lecturer - University of Peradeniya (Anatomy - Faculty of Medicine), and Deputy Vice Chancellor (Academic) - Kotelawala Defence University.

During his career, Weerasooriya established Sri Lanka’s first andrology clinic, a diagnostic semen laboratory, a sperm bank with a donor insemination programme, and the National IVF Laboratory at Mahamodara Hospital, Galle, to support clinical services, research, and training. He helped establish the Faculties of Medicine at Rajarata and KDU.

== Biography ==
Weerasooriya was born on 20 November 1950, in Gampola, to Maurice Weerasooriya (1907–1990), Chief Education Officer, and Emily Weerasooriya (1926–2017). He had 4 siblings, Nandani, Nisala, Deepa and Asoka Weerasooriya. He attended Richmond College, Galle for his primary & secondary education, and later entered the University of Peradeniya where he obtained his MBBS in 1977.

After completing his MBBS at the University of Peradeniya, Weerasooriya later joined Kyushu University's Department of Anatomy, Fukuoka, in the island of Kyushu in Japan, in order to obtain his PhD. His PhD was on the Micro vasculature of the testis, using electron microscopy. He specialised in Andrology.

Specialising in andrology, he is credited as Sri Lanka’s pioneer andrologist. He established the country’s first andrology clinic, a diagnostic semen laboratory, and a sperm bank with a donor-insemination programme, and helped set up the National IVF Laboratory at Mahamodara Hospital, Galle, to support clinical services, research, and training.

Weerasooriya died on 20 February 2022, aged 71.

== Personal life ==
Tilak married Mirani Weerasooriya in 1980, they had three children; Senal, Sahan and Semali.

== Selected publications ==
- Weerasooriya, Tilak R., and Torao Yaniamoto. "Three-dimensional organisation of the vasculature of the rat spermatic cord and testis." Cell and tissue research 241.2 (1985): 317–323.
- T.R. Weerasooriya, & Wattage, A. P. P. (1997). An analysis of the pregnancies that occurred following in-utero insemination.
- Ilayperuma, I., W. D. Ratnasooriya, and T. R. Weerasooriya. "Effect of Withania somnifera root extract on the sexual behaviour of male rats." Asian Journal of Andrology 4.4 (2002): 295–298.
- Weerasooriya, Tilak R. "Laboratory assistance in the management of infertility." (1997).
- Fernando, L., J. Gromoll, T. R. Weerasooriya, E. Nieschlag, and Manuela Simoni. "Y‐chromosomal microdeletions and partial deletions of the Azoospermia Factor c (AZFc) region in normozoospermic, severe oligozoospermic and azoospermic men in Sri Lanka." Asian journal of andrology 8, no. 1 (2006): 39–44.
- Weerasooriya, M. V., T. R. Weerasooriya, N. K. Gunawardena, W. A. Samarawickrema, and E. Kimura. "Epidemiology of bancroftian filariasis in three suburban areas of Matara, Sri Lanka." Annals of Tropical Medicine & Parasitology 95, no. 3 (2001): 263–273.
- Weerasooriya, M. V., E. Kimura, D. A. Dayaratna, T. R. Weerasooriya, and W. A. Samarawickrema. "Efficacy of a single dose treatment of Wuchereria bancrofti microfilaria carriers with diethylcarbamazine in Matara, Sri Lanka." The Ceylon Medical Journal 43, no. 3 (1998): 151–155.
- Karunarathne, Y. A. U. D., L. D. A. M. Arawwawala, A. P. G. Amarasinghe, T. R. Weerasooriya, and U. K. A. Samarasinha. "Physicochemical, phytochemical, and nutritional profiles of root powder of Asparagus racemosus (Willd) of Sri Lankan origin." Asian J. Pharmacogn 3, no. 3 (2019): 29–35.
- Ilayperuma, I., W. D. Ratnasooriya, and T. R. Weerasooriya. "Methanol and water extracts of Withania somnifera roots has no abortifacient effect in rats." (2002).
- T.R Weerasooriya, and I. M. R. Goonewardene. "Sperm preparation and in utero insemination in the management of subfertility." Ceylon Medical Journal 41 (1996): 54–56.
- Fernando, H. H. L. K., R. Senevirathne, and T. R. Weerasooriya. "Can varicocelectomy Improve the Seminal Fluid Parameter Abnormalities?." (2012).
- Fernando, H. H. L. K., R. Senevirathne, P. M. Rodrigo, and T. R. Weerasooriya. "Can Clomiphene Citrate Improve the Quality of Seminal Fluid Parameters in Idipathic Oligoasthenoteratozoospermic Males." (2014).
- WEERASOORIYA, TR, and T. YAMAMOTO. "POSTNATAL-DEVELOPMENT AND THE 3-DIMENSIONAL ORGANIZATION OF THE TESTICULAR LYMPHATICS IN THE RAT." In JOURNAL OF ELECTRON MICROSCOPY, vol. 35, no. 1, pp. 95–95. WALTON ST JOURNALS DEPT, OXFORD, ENGLAND OX2 6DP: OXFORD UNIV PRESS UNITED KINGDOM, 1986.
- Fernando, L., J. Gromoll, T. R. Weerasooriya, E. Nieschlag, and S. Simoni. "Frequency of Y-chromosome microdeletions and partial deletions of AZFc region in normozoospermic, severe oligozoospermic and azoospermic groups in Sri Lanka." In INTERNATIONAL JOURNAL OF ANDROLOGY, vol. 28, pp. 92–92. COMMERCE PLACE, 350 MAIN ST, MALDEN 02148, MA USA: WILEY-BLACKWELL, 2005.
- Amarasinghe, D. M. Y., T. R. Weerasooriya, and I. M. R. Goonewardene. "Oocyte cryopreservation-a cost effective method."

Academic offices
Preceded by	Dean of the University of Ruhuna (Faculty of Medicine)	Succeeded by Vasantha Devasiri
Preceded by	Deputy Vice Chancellor (Academic) of the Kotelawala Defence University	Succeeded by K.A.S.Dhammika
