= Trinity College, Kandy =

Private school in Kandy, Sri Lanka

Trinity College
- ත්‍රිත්ව විද්‍යාලය டிரினிட்டி கல்லூரி

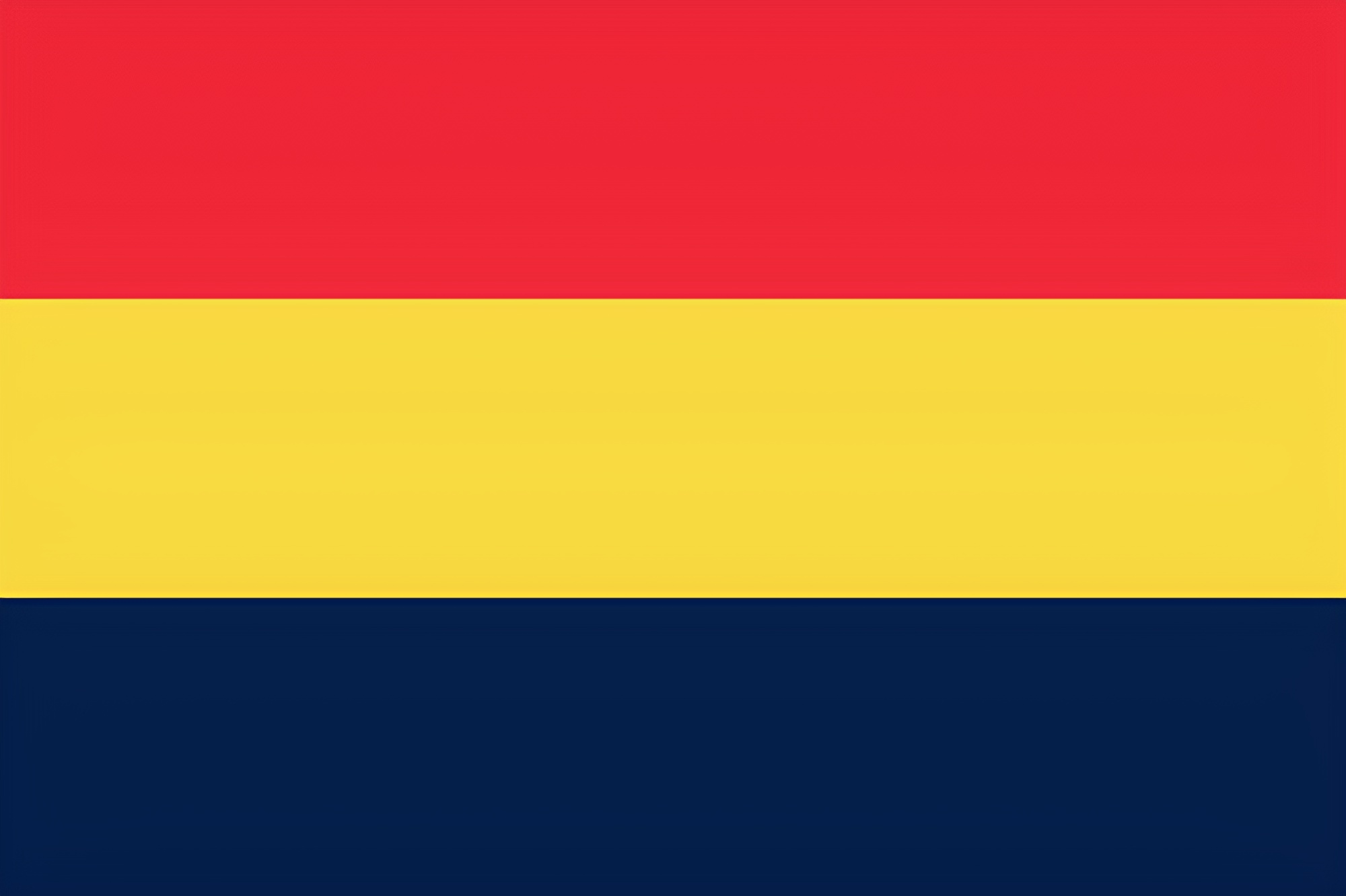
- Flag of Trinity College

Location
- No. 262, D. S. Senanayake Veediya; Kandy, 20000; Sri Lanka; 7°18′00″N 80°38′13″E

Information
- Former name: Kandy Collegiate School
- School type: Private school with day and boarding facilities
- Motto: Latin: Respice finem (Look to the end)
- Religious affiliation: Christianity
- Denomination: Anglican Church of Ceylon
- Established: 17 January 1872; 154 years ago
- Founder: John Ireland Jones
- School board: The Board of Governors of Trinity College
- Chairman: Dushantha Lakshman Rodrigo
- Principal: Dayan D. L. Fernando
- Chaplain: Shelton Daniel
- Grades: 1–14
- Gender: Male
- Age range: 6–19
- Enrollment: 3,500
- Education system: National Education System; Edexcel
- Language: English; Sinhala; Tamil
- Hours in school day: 07:30–14:30 SLST
- Colours: Trinity red, Trinity yellow and Trinity blue
- Song: "The Best School of All"
- Publication: Trinity College Magazine
- Alumni: Old Trinitians
- Website: trinitycollege.lk
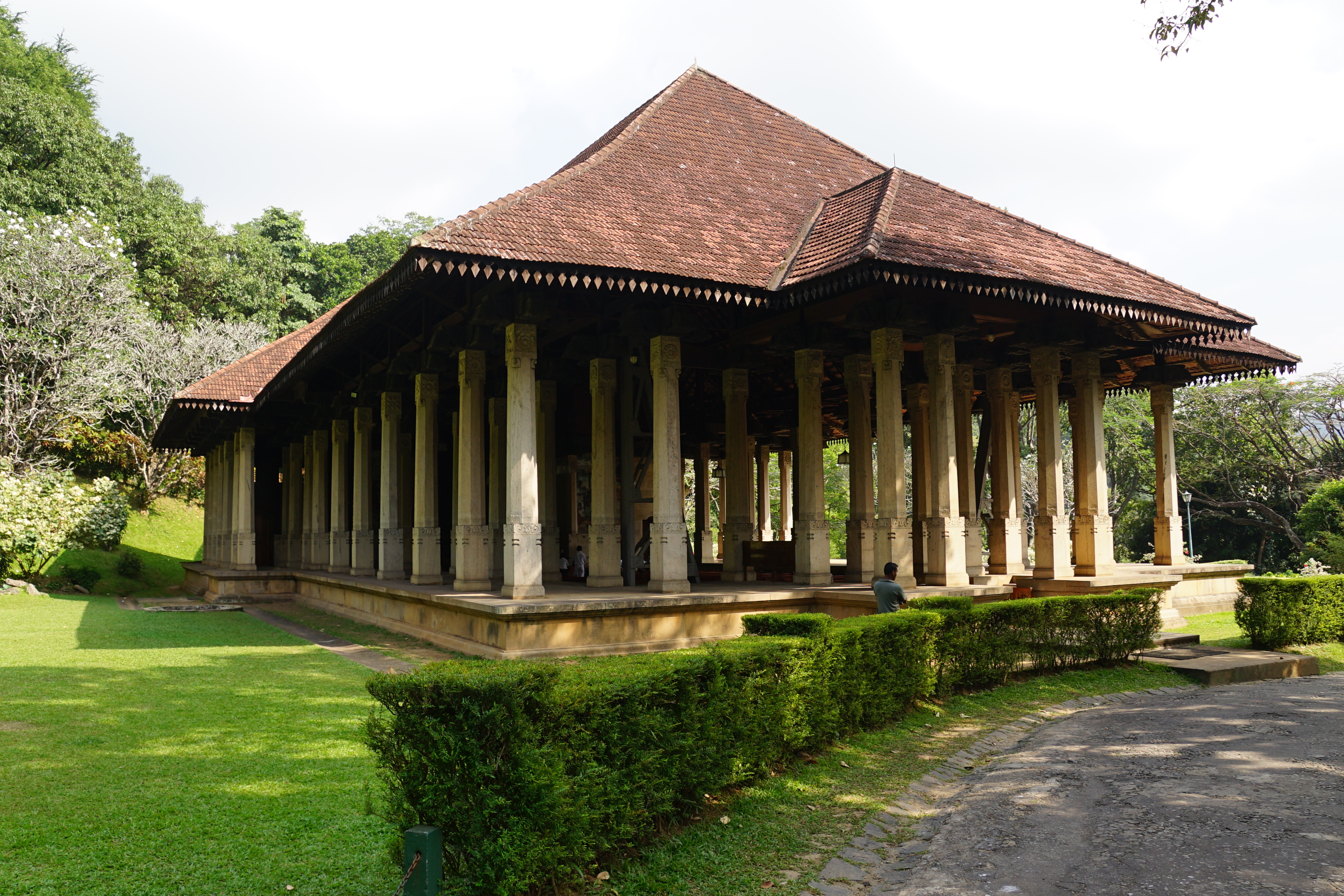
- Trinity College Chapel

Trinity College, Kandy is a private Anglican boys' school located in Kandy, Sri Lanka. It offers both day and boarding facilities. It was founded in 1872 by British Anglican missionaries of the Church Missionary Society (CMS) and modelled on British public school tradition. Trinity offers primary and secondary education and is managed by the Anglican Church of Ceylon.

== History ==
=== 1800s ===
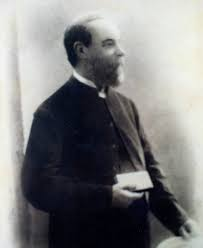
Rev. J. Ireland Jones (1857-1860), founder of the Kandy Collegiate School

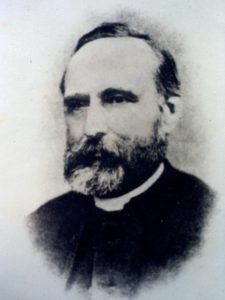
Rev. Richard Collins (1872-1878), founder of Trinity College

In 1857, the local Anglican community in Kandy urged the Church Missionary Society to establish a school for boys in the area. On 16 October 1857, the Rev. John Ireland Jones arrived from England, establishing the Kandy Collegiate School. The school operated for approximately six years.

In 1872 the CMS sent out the Rev. Richard Collins, the principal of the CMS Syrian College of Travancore to re-open the collegiate school in Kandy. On 18 January 1872, it was re-opened as the Trinity College and Collegiate School, with the Collins as principal and by the end of that year there were 120 enrolled students. The school library was opened in 1875. Early in 1877 the Collegiate School name was dropped and it simply became Trinity College. Rev. Collins left in 1878 and Thomas Dunn became acting principal of the school. In 1879 the college was affiliated with the University of Calcutta.

In 1880 the Rev. John G. Garrett was appointed as principal of the school and by the following year enrolments had increased to 238 students, with 30 boarders. In 1885 Garrett had to resign due to ill health and was replaced by the Rev. Dr. E. Noel Hodges, formerly the principal of the Noble High School, Machilipatnam. In 1889 Dr. Hodges was appointed as the Anglican Bishop of Travancore and Cochin and his post at Trinity was taken by Rev. Edward John Perry, who had been a master at Merchant Taylors' School. On 2 April 1890, Perry was accidentally shot dead near Alutnuwara, whilst on a visit to the Vedda people in the area. The Rev. J. W. Fall, who was the vice-principal, became the acting principal until the arrival of the Rev. Henry Percy Napier-Clavering, in June 1890. At that time Trinity had 298 students, of whom sixty-three were boarders.

=== 1900s ===
In August 1900 Napier-Clavering resigned to return to England and attend to family matters. He was replaced by Rev. Robert William Ryde, who had previously been the vice-principal at the school from 1895 to 1899 before becoming the principal at St. John's College, Jaffna. Rev. Ryde held this post for a brief two years, leaving in 1902. In 1902 the Rev. J. Carter became the temporary principal followed by a succession of temporary principals, including the Rev. Napier-Clavering and the Rev. A. MacLulich.

On 5 November 1904, the Rev. Alexander Garden Fraser was appointed as the principal of the school. During Fraser's tenure he transformed a provincial school into a nationally recognised institution. His educational reforms included the introduction of Sinhalese and Tamil into the curriculum and increased its involvement in the local community. He was responsible for a number of building projects, including the Asgiriya Stadium and the Trinity College Chapel. He served continuously as the principal for eighteen years until 1922, his service was only interrupted by two years when he served as an army chaplain with the British Expeditionary Force in France during World War I.

The school was headed from 1925 to 1935 by Canon John McLeod Campbell (who later served as chaplain to the Royal Family). McLeod Campbell retired in 1935 and was replaced by Rev. Robert Stopford. Stopford was the last English-born principal of the school, remaining in the position for five years. He later became Bishop of London. During his tenure, the college hall was gifted by a former student, A. H. T. De Soysa. In 1940 the Church Missionary Society handed control of the school to an independent board of governors.

The board's first appointment was C. E. Simithraaratchy, the first old boy and Ceylonese-born principal, who ran the school from 1941 until 1951, including the Second World War years. His successor was Norman Sydney Walter, from 1952 to 1957. Walter returned to England and later became the headmaster of Loughborough Grammar School. The responsibility for the school was then passed onto Cedric James Oorloff (formerly the principal of Wesley College, Colombo) between 1957 and 1968. In 1968 E. Lionel Fernando became the second former student to be appointed as the school's principal. His tenure ran for nine years, until 1977. At which time W. G. Wickremasinghe (the principal of Carey College, Colombo) was appointed as principal of the school. He was followed by Lt. Col. Leonard M. De Alwis in 1988 who was responsible for the Pallekele Rugby Stadium. He administered the school until 1998 and resigned to take on the role as the inaugural principal of Springfield College, Kandy. De Alwis was succeeded by Warren Ranjithan Breckenridge. Breckenridge was a former student at Trinity and a professor of zoology at Peradeniya University, a post he held until 1998 when he was appointed the principal of Trinity.

=== 2000s ===
Following Breckenridge's retirement the college in 2003 appointed Roderick Gilbert as the school's principal. Gilbert, an Indian-born Englishman, who was previously the principal at the Hebron School in Ootacamund, India. Brig. Udaya Aryaratne was the principal from 2008 to 2015 and was succeeded by former vice principal Colin B. Ratnayake, as the acting principal until the appointment of Andrew Fowler-Watt in 2016.

Rev. Fr. Araliya Jayasundara OSB assumed the role of principal, succeeding Andrew Fowler-Watt, effective from 1 October 2020. Rev. Jayasundara left the post on 7 August 2026 to assume duties as the Conventual Prior of the Priory of St. Sylvester of the Sylvestro in Ampitiya, Kandy. Dayan D. L. Fernando assumed the role of principal on 1 October 2026.

== World War I ==
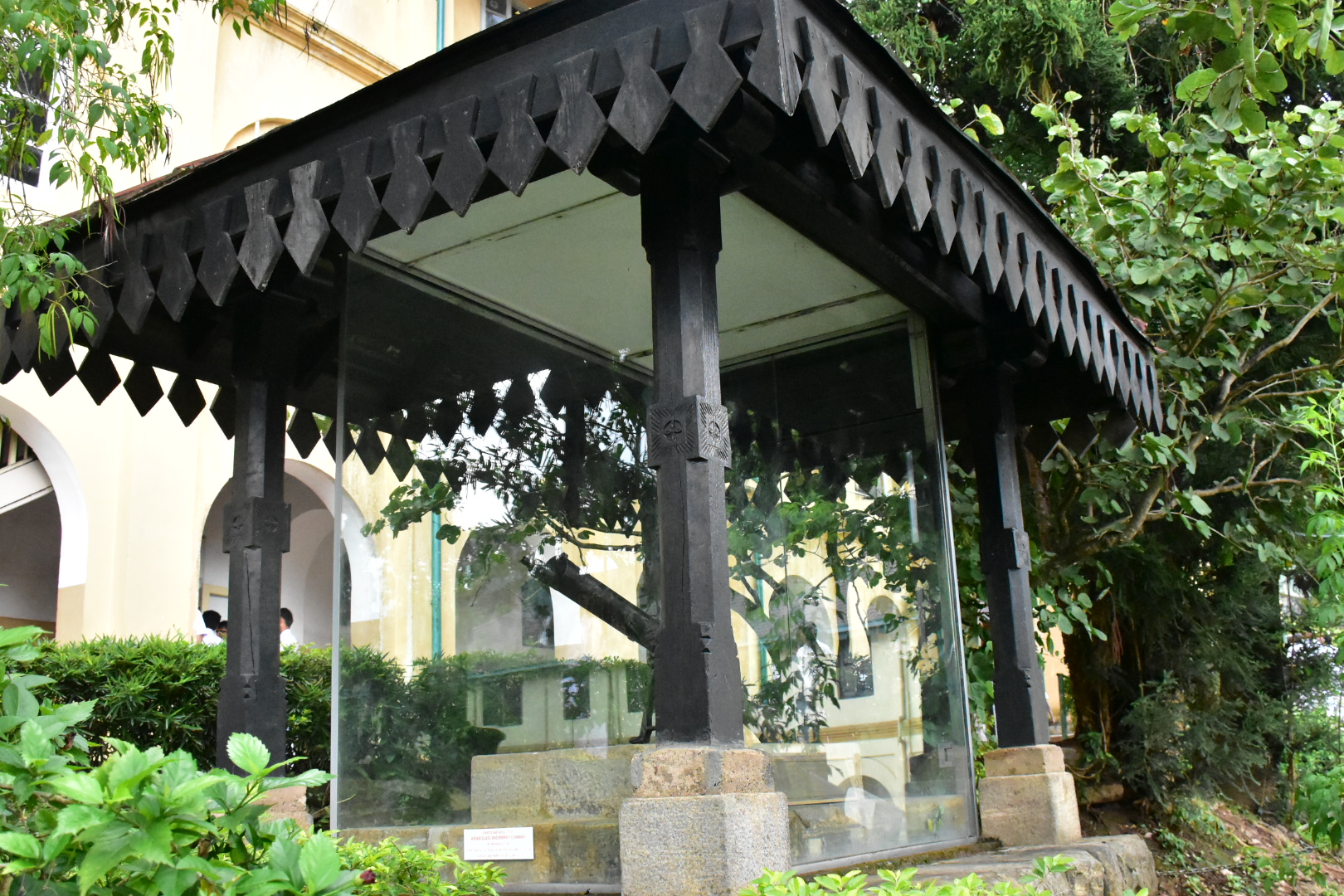
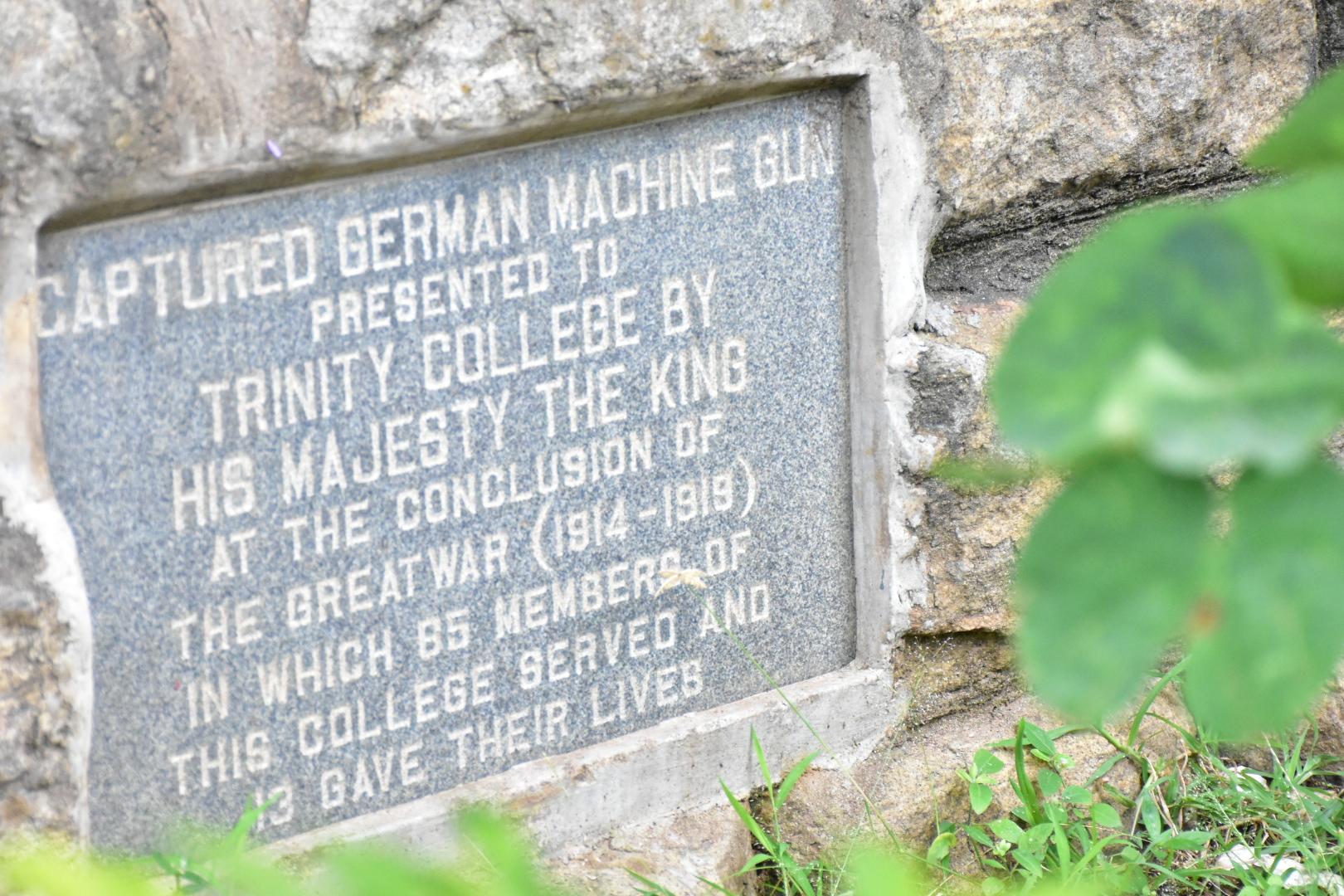
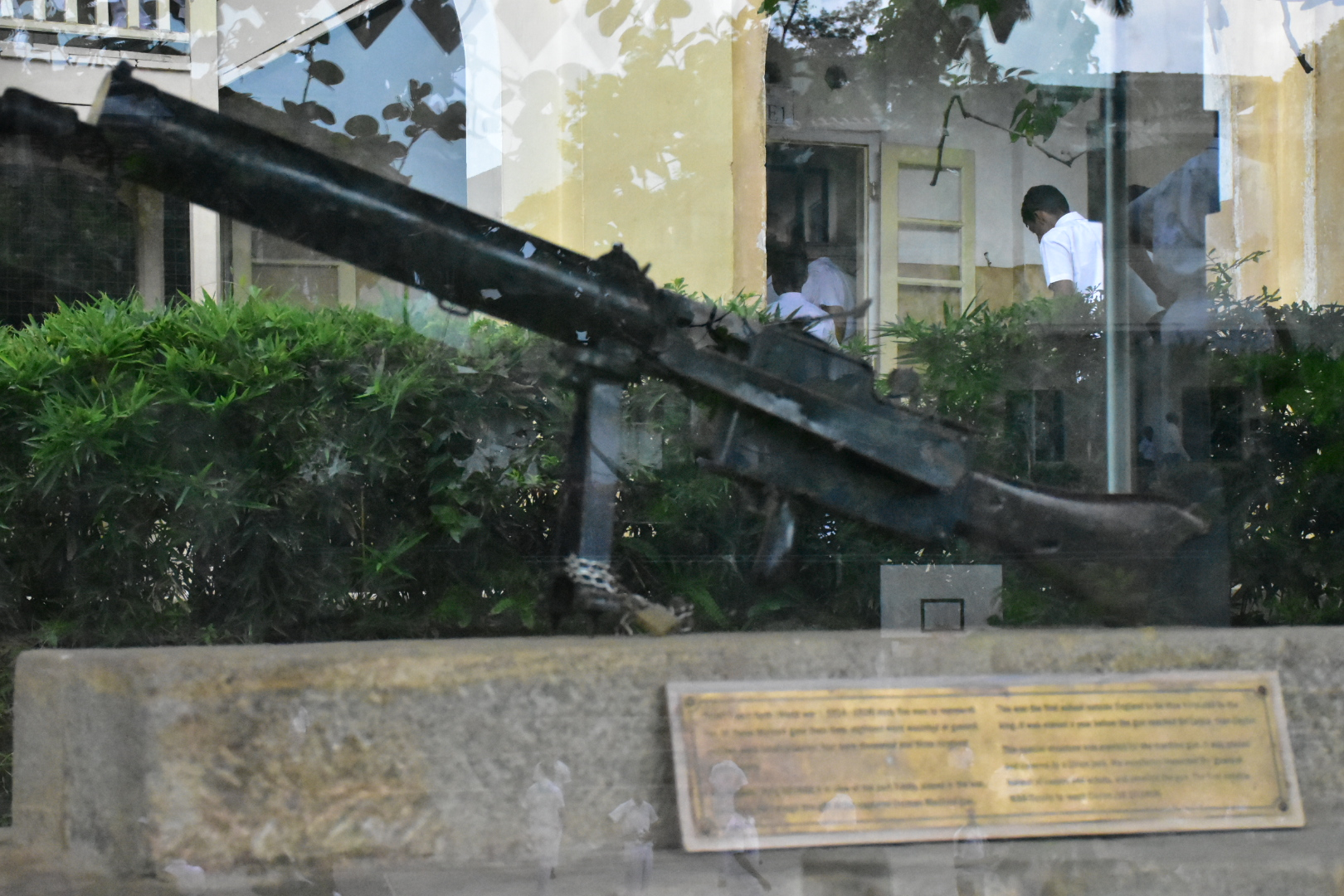
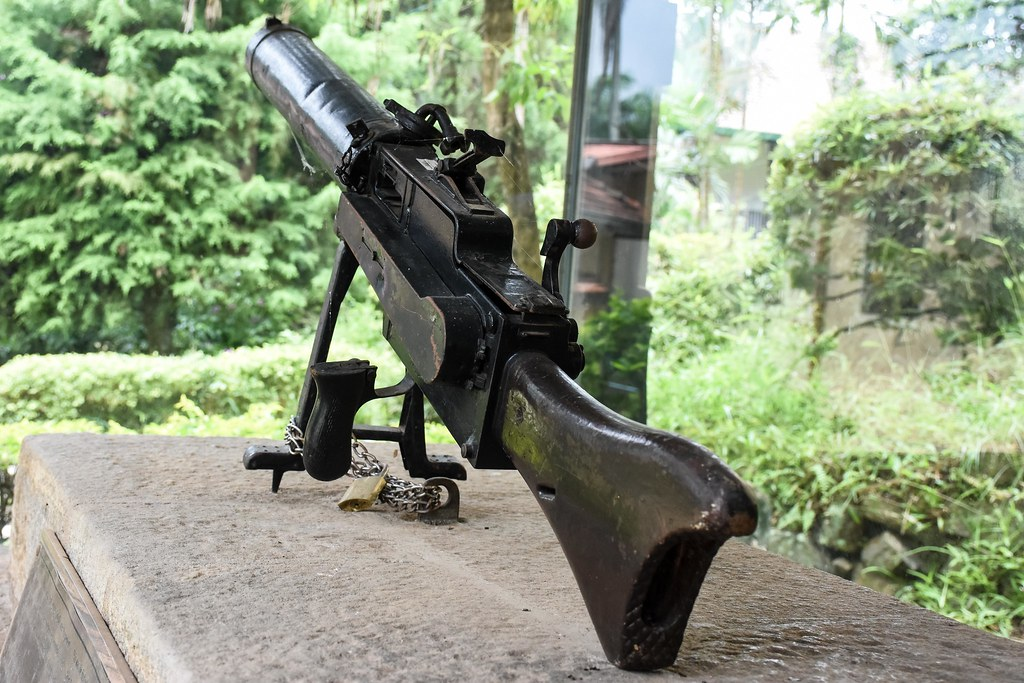
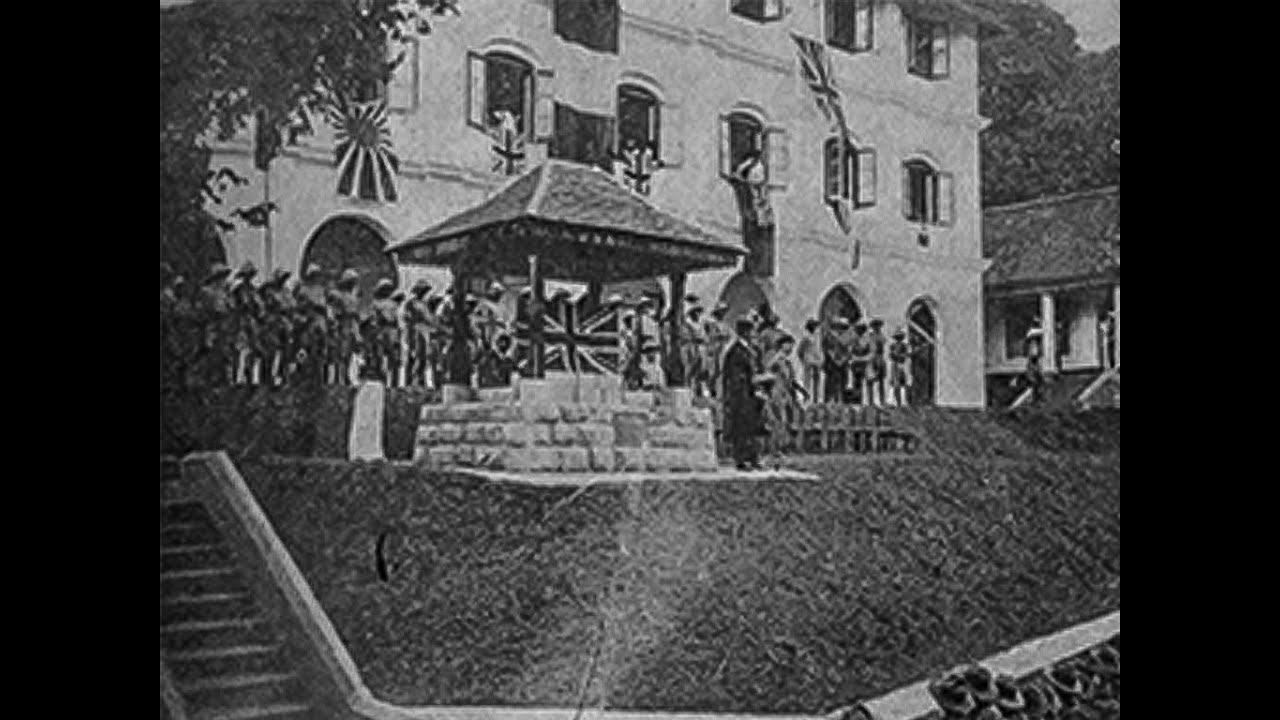
- Top left: World War I memorial at Trinity College.
- Top right: The plaque at the memorial.
- Middle: MG 08 heavy machine gun.
- Bottom: The ceremonial unveiling by the Governor in 1919.

Trinity College and two other English missionary schools, namely S. Thomas' College, Mount Lavinia and Kingswood College, Kandy, and the state school Royal College, Colombo, had students who served in the First World War. Among the Trinitians, Aelian Perera was awarded a commission with the Durham Light Infantry and J. W. S. Bartholomeusz received the Croix de Guerre of the first class for his valour.

The World War I memorial of a German machine gun stands overlooking the quadrangle in front of the Alison house. The memorial is based on traditional Sri Lankan architecture and was unveiled on behalf of King George V on 16 October 1919 by Sir William Henry Manning, the Governor of Ceylon. The memorial commemorates the service of 65 former students and staff from Trinity, including principal, Rev. A. G. Fraser, who fought in the First World War.

The Governor in his commendatory tribute stated:

To me, Trinity College has a record and a Roll of Honour of which it may be justly proud. I find that 65 masters, men and boys gave their services overseas during the war and of these 65, there were no fewer than 33 casualties – 13 killed, 18 wounded, and two taken prisoner by the Germans. Now that is 50% of the number that proceeded to the battlefront. It is a record, I repeat again of which Trinity College may well be proud of – a record, I am sure you will agree with me, which any battalion, any regiment, any unit of His Majesty's service would be proud of.

— William Henry Manning

The centre of the memorial is a Maschinengewehr 08, which was captured from an enemy encampment. The machine gun was the first noteworthy war trophy gifted by the King to Ceylon. Trinity was the first school outside the United Kingdom to be so honoured.

== Principals ==
As of 22 June 2026

Principals of Trinity College: 1860–present
Portrait	Name	Start	End	Notes
Kandy Collegiate School
	John Ireland Jones, MA (Dubl)	1860	1872	Founder of the Kandy Collegiate School (Note: Rev. Jones was the principal of Kandy Collegiate School, the predecessor of Trinity College.)
Trinity College, Kandy
	Richard Collins, MA (Cantab)	1872	1878	First principal of Trinity College
	John G. Garrett, MA (Dubl)	1880	1886	
	Edward Noel Hodges, MA (Oxon), DD	1886	1889	Bishop Emeritus of Travancore and Cochin
	Edward John Perry, MA (Oxon)	1889	1890	(Note: Rev. Perry was the first qualified teacher to serve as principal.) (Note: In 1890, Perry was accidentally shot by a pupil.)
	Henry Percy Napier-Clavering, MA (Cantab)	1890	1900	
	Robert William Ryde, MA (Cantab)	1900	1902	(Note: Between 1900 and 1904, Trinity College had six principals – one permanent and five acting.)
	Alexander Garden Fraser, MA (Oxon), CBE	1904	1924	
	John McLeod Campbell, MA (Oxon), MC, DD	1924	1935	Honorary Chaplain to the Queen; Chaplain to the Speaker of the House of Commons
	Robert Stopford, MA (Oxon), DD, KCVO, CBE	1935	1941	Honorary Chaplain to the Queen (1952–1955); Bishop Emeritus of Peterborough (1956–1961); Bishop Emeritus of London (1961–1973); Dean of Her Majesty's Chapels Royal (1961–1973); Bishop Emeritus of Bermuda (1976)
	C. E. Simithraaratchy, BSc (Cey.)	1941	1951	The first Ceylonese and the first alumnus to serve as principal
	Norman Sydney Walter, MA (Oxon)	1951	1957	
	Cedric James Oorloff, BA (Lond), CCS	1957	1968	
	E. Lionel Fernando, BA (Cey.)	1968	1977	
	W. G. Wickremasinghe, MA (Oxon), DD	1978	1988	Former president of the Sri Lanka Baptist Sangamaya
	Leonard M. De Alwis, MA (Hull)	1988	1998	
	Warren Ranjithan Breckenridge, BSc (Cey.), PhD (McGill)	1998	2003	
	Roderick Gilbert, B.Ed. (Lond)	2004	2008	(Note: Gilbert's and his wife's visas were cancelled by the Sri Lankan Government in 2008, seven months prior to their expiry, compelling Gilbert to resign and leave the country.)
	W. Gamini Kumara Udaya Aryaratne, B.Tech. (CME, Pune)	2014	2015	(Note: Brig. Aryaratne's actual rank in the Sri Lankan Army was a Colonel and he only served as a temporary Brigadier. His tenure was marked by a plethora of court cases, some alleging that he could not substantiate some of the qualifications he had claimed.) (Note: His tenure ended in May 2015 through court intervention and Colin Ratnayake replaced him as acting principal pending the appointment of a new principal.)
	Andrew Fowler-Watt, MA (Cantab)	2016	2020	
	Araliya Jayasundara OSB, MSc, MA (Pera), MPhil, SLPS	2020	2026	(Note: Sri Lanka Principal Service (SLPS)); Conventual Prior of the Priory of St. Sylvester of the Sylvestro, Ampitiya, Kandy
	Dayan D. L. Fernando, BA, MA	2026	present	Assumed duties on 1 October 2026

== School song and hymn ==
The school song, "The Best School of All", was adapted from a poem composed by Sir Henry Newbolt in 1889 as a song for Old Boys of Clifton College in Bristol - his alma mater. The tune of the school song was composed by Lawrence Arthur Adamson, headmaster of Wesley College, Melbourne in 1907.

The words of the school hymn were composed by Walter Stanley Senior and is sung to the hymn tune, "Bishopgarth" composed by Arthur Sullivan for the Golden Jubilee of Queen Victoria. Senior was the vice-principal at the college for ten years (1906–1916), he also deputised as acting principal for a short period in the absence of Alexander Fraser.

== College crest ==
Coat of arms of Trinity College, Kandy
Notes The Crest was designed in 1912 by the school's vice-principal, Rev. Lewis John Gaster, who was a qualified architect and draughtsman. It first appeared in the debut of the school's magazine, published in 1921. Adopted 1922 Motto Respice finem (Latin for "Look to the end") Symbolism The lion: Poised atop the shield, symbolising strength and vigilance. The three crowns: Representing the Holy Trinity, a core element of Christian doctrine. The cross: Emphasising the college's Christian missionary roots. Colours: Roaring red, glorious gold, and brilliant blue, each chosen for their historical and symbolic significance. The scholastic scroll: A scroll of wisdom, underscoring the college's dedication to academic excellence. Previous versions The school crest has evolved twice since the inception in 1857.

=== Origins and inspiration ===
The crest's design draws inspiration from the crests of Clifton College, a boarding school influenced by Rugby School, and Trinity College, Cambridge.

- Lion: The Lankan lion atop the shield, holding a sword in its right paw, is derived from the Sinhalese flag.
- Cross: Replacing the chevrons used in the Clifton College and Trinity College, Cambridge crests, the cross represents the college's Christian heritage.
- Three crowns: Adapted from the coronets of University of Oxford, these signify the Holy Trinity and convey a sense of nobility, reflecting the influence of Trinity College, Cambridge.
- Motto: Respice finem emphasises the importance not only of perseverance to the end but also of maintaining the highest standards and ideals throughout.

== Awards ==
=== Ryde Gold Medal ===
The Ryde Gold Medal is awarded each year to the "best all-round boy" at Trinity. The Ryde Gold Medal is the highest honour that the school can bestow. It is awarded on the result of a secret ballot conducted among the senior boys and the staff whose votes, together with that of the principal, each count as one. While this system makes deadlock possible, it is only on four occasions that the medal has not been awarded as a result of the three votes going to three different people. The medal cannot be won more than once.

The Ryde Gold Medal was first presented in 1908 to John Andrew, but he was not the first boy in the history of the school to be adjudged the best all-rounder. Historical records show that such a prize has been awarded as early as 1894. The Ryde Gold Medal is named after R. W. Ryde, a former principal of Trinity (1900–1902).

Notable winners of the Ryde Gold Medal include Dr Jayantha Dhanapala (1956), the former Under Secretary-General of the UN and senior special advisor to presidents Chandrika Bandaranaike Kumaratunga and Mahinda Rajapakse, former Sri Lankan Foreign Minister Lakshman Kadirgamar (1949), former vice-president and CIO of the World Bank; M.V. Muhsin (1962), first Ceylonese IGP and Ambassador Sir Richard Aluwihare (1915) and Sri Lankan Cricket Captain Kumar Sangakkara (1996).

=== Trinity Lion ===
The Trinity Lion is the most prestigious award a sportsman can achieve at Trinity. Rugby Lions were awarded in 1915, to A. Halangoda and R. Ondaatje. Since then there have been 129 Rugby Lionsmen (until 2004). Notable awardees of Trinity Lions include former Sri Lankan Foreign Minister, Lakshman Kadirgamar; former Lieutenant General Denzil Kobbekaduwa: Sri Lankan Cricketers Kumar Sangakkara, Ravi Ratnayeke, Olympic Silver Medalist Duncan White and former major general and Ambassador Niranjan A Ranasinghe. There has been one Triple Lion in Trinity's history which is Thushara Weerasooriya who achieved this feat in 1986 in Rugby, Cricket, and Athletics.

== Day and boarding houses ==
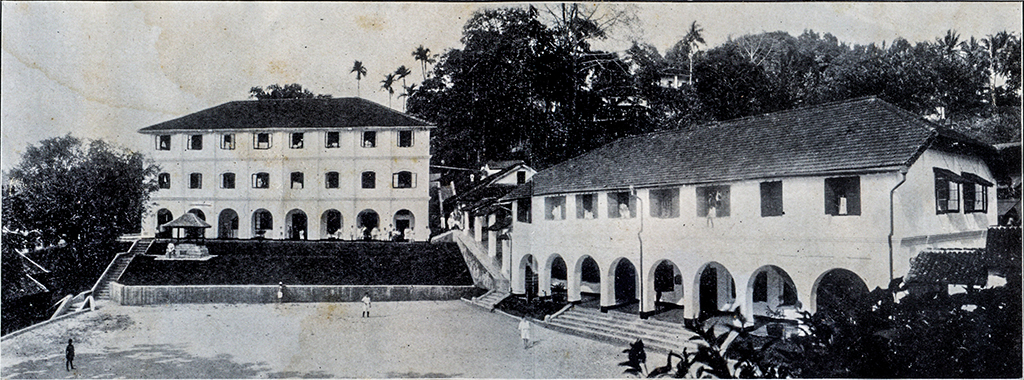
Alison (left) and Napier (right) houses after WWI

Trinity College rose into prominence as a Boarding School since its inception in 1872. The boarding system got referred to as the "Backbone of college". Often, well to do parents from all around Ceylon, the British Empire, and the world sent their children to the Trinity boarding. Royal families in Uganda, Gold Coast (Ghana), Brunei and Maldives, to respectable communities in China and the Middle East, boarded their children at Trinity in the days of old.

The senior school students are divided into five houses. Their names are derived from past principals and teachers of the college. There are three boarding houses, however, due to low numbers of boarders they collectively compete as the Central Boarding House. The houses are led by House Captains, competing in all major games to win the inter-house competitions.

=== Central Boarding House ===
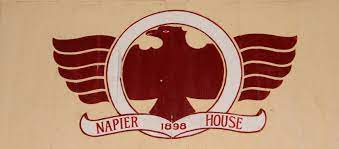
Arms of Napier House

Napier House

- Colours: Red and White
- The first official Senior Boarding House was started in 1898 and constructed by Rev H. P. Napier-Clavering and later named after him as Napier House. The UNESCO declared Napier house as a conserved structure within the world heritage city of Kandy.

Alison House

- Colours: Blue and White
- On 7 June 1909, the foundation stone of Alison house was laid by Mrs Fraser. Alison house was designed by Norman S. Campbell and was constructed by Messrs. Walker, Sons & Co. Ltd. The opening ceremony of the Alison House took place on 17 December 1909 in the presence of Ernest Arthur Copleston D. D. Bishop of Colombo. The Governor, Sir Henry Edward McCallum, opened the Laboratories by unlocking the main door with a silver key handed to him by the principal, Rev. A. G. Fraser. The new dormitory got named after Alison Watson, the daughter of Mr William Watson of Newcastle, whom Fraser appointed as honorary secretary and treasurer of the Trinity College Extension Fund in Great Britain.

Ryde House

- Colours: Black and Yellow
- Ryde House got opened as the 3rd boarding house of Trinity in 1911, during the tenure of Alexander Garden Fraser. Ryde house got named after Robert William Ryde - the sixth principal of Trinity College.

=== Houses of day scholars ===
Garret House

- Colours: Green
- Established: 1910 (named after the third principal, Rev. John Garrett)

Lemuel House

- Colours: Blue
- Established: 1954 (named after C. N. Lemuel, a long-serving teacher at Trinity College)

Oorloff House

- Colours: Maroon
- Established : (named after the thirteenth principal, Cedric Oorloff)

Simithraaratchy House

- Colours: Yellow
- Established : (named after the eleventh principal, C. E. Simithraaratchy)

=== Junior boarding ===
The junior boarding accommodates students from Grades 4 to 7. In the past, 5-year-olds got housed in the matron's dormitory from where they went to the Junior School Boarding Houses, named after former principals Collins, Hodges and Perry. Between the junior and senior houses, the boarders got housed in a dormitory referred to as Squealary, which got further divided into Junior, Senior and Super. And within these houses, they had separate sections named after three well-known British Public Schools, Eton, Harrow and Rugby. Currently, the boarding does not issue admission to students below fourth grade.

== Co-curricular activities ==
=== School choir ===
The Trinity College choir was established with the inception of the school in 1872, with Clement Edwards as the founding choirmaster. In 1946, the annual performance of A Festival of Nine Lessons and Carols commenced, and it continues to be held during Advent. On 1 February 2018, the choir performed in honour of the visit to Trinity College by Prince Edward, then the Earl of Wessex, and Sophie, Countess of Wessex. In addition to A Festival of Nine Lessons and Carols, the choir stages another performance during Lent on Palm Sunday, titled The Cross and Triumph of Christ as well as various other performances throughout the year.

== Extracurricular activities ==
=== Sports ===
Sports are a major part of Trinity's curriculum, history and culture, with cricket and rugby union being the most prominent.

=== Sports facilities ===
The school owns and manages the Asgiriya Stadium and the Trinity College Rugby Stadium, which are used for cricket and rugby respectively. In addition, these venues host other sports as well.

=== Cricket ===
Trinity adopted cricket in 1893. The initial cricket fixtures featured teams consisting of both staff and students.

==== Battle of the Blues ====
The Battle of the Blues (Kandy), also referred to as the Trinity–Antonian Cricket Encounter, stands as the sixth oldest traditional school cricket match, commonly known as a Big Match, held annually in Sri Lanka. Dating back to March 1914, this encounter sees Trinity College and St. Anthony's College, engage in a three-day cricket contest. (Note: A two-day encounter from 1914 to 2024, extending to three days from 2025 onwards.) The John Halangoda Memorial Trophy is awarded to the victor of the match, determined by either an outright win or, failing that, a first innings triumph.

Following the conclusion of the three-day match, a limited-overs encounter is typically held a week later. This series was inaugurated in 1980 and the winning team is awarded the Sir Richard Aluwihare Trophy.

As of 12 April 2025, the three-day encounter has been contested 106 times. Trinity leads the series with 23 wins, St. Anthony's has 11 wins and 72 matches have ended in draws. The limited-overs encounter has been contested 43 times, with Trinity leading the series with 21 wins, St. Anthony's securing 17 wins, one match ending in a tie and four matches producing no result.

==== Mahela-Sanga Challenge Trophy ====
The Mahela–Sanga Challenge Trophy is awarded to the winners of the annual inter-school cricket fixture between Trinity College and Nalanda College. Named after two prominent cricketers produced by the schools, Kumar Sangakkara of Trinity and Mahela Jayawardene of Nalanda, it was introduced in 2019. The Trinity–Nalanda cricket encounter has been an annual fixture since 1978.

=== Rugby ===
Trinity adopted rugby in 1906. On 11 August 1906, the first inter-school rugby match in the country was played between Trinity and Kingswood College, ending in a 6–6 draw.

On 2 August 2025, Trinity College won the 2025 Dialog Schools Rugby League, securing the domestic inter-school rugby title with one game remaining. This was Trinity's first title win since 1987.

On 4 April 2026, Trinity College won the 2026 Milo President's Trophy inter-school knockout rugby tournament, defeating Royal College 58–26 in the final held at Sugathadasa Stadium, Colombo. This was Trinity's first knockout title win since 2011. On 27 June 2026, Trinity College secured the 2026 Dialog Schools Rugby League title, remaining undefeated throughout the season. In doing so, they retained the title won the previous year and completed the domestic double for the season.

==== Bradby Shield Encounter ====
The annual Bradby Shield Encounter is regarded as one of the premier sporting events in Sri Lanka. It is contested between Trinity College and Royal College on a home-and-away basis, with the winner determined by the aggregate score across both matches.

Trinity College and Royal College were among the pioneer schools in British Ceylon to adopt rugby as a sport, in 1906 and 1916 respectively. The first rugby encounter between the two schools took place on 31 July 1920, with Trinity emerging victorious by 26–0. In 1945, the outgoing principal of Royal College, E. L. Bradby, presented a shield, with the support of the then principal of Trinity College, C. E. Simithraaratchy, to be awarded annually in a two-legged rugby encounter. The inaugural Bradby Shield matches were held on 13 and 20 July 1945 and the encounter was won by Trinity with an aggregate score of 6–3.

In 1971, only the first leg of the 27th encounter was held due to the 1971 JVP insurrection. Royal College was awarded the Shield based on the result of the first leg, which they won 22–3. The series was suspended in 2020 and 2021 due to the COVID-19 pandemic, marking the first time in its history that it was completely halted.

== Publications and the digital archive ==
During the 3rd rendition of the Annual Fraser Memorial Oration on 12 February 2024, The Trinity Story 1872–2022, a book providing a narrative of the life and times of Trinity as envisioned by the founding fathers and spanning 150 years, was launched. The first copy was presented to the principal.

The Trinity Digital History website was also launched on the same date. This website serves as a comprehensive digital archive of Trinity's historical records spanning from 1872 onwards.

== Notes ==
Sources

- "Centenary Number, Trinity College, Kandy, 1872–1972" (PDF). noolaham.net. 17 March 1972. Archived from the original (PDF) on 8 August 2024.
- "The Trinity Story 1872–2022". history.trinitycollege.lk. 12 February 2024. Archived from the original on 13 May 2025.
