= Deforestation in Sri Lanka =

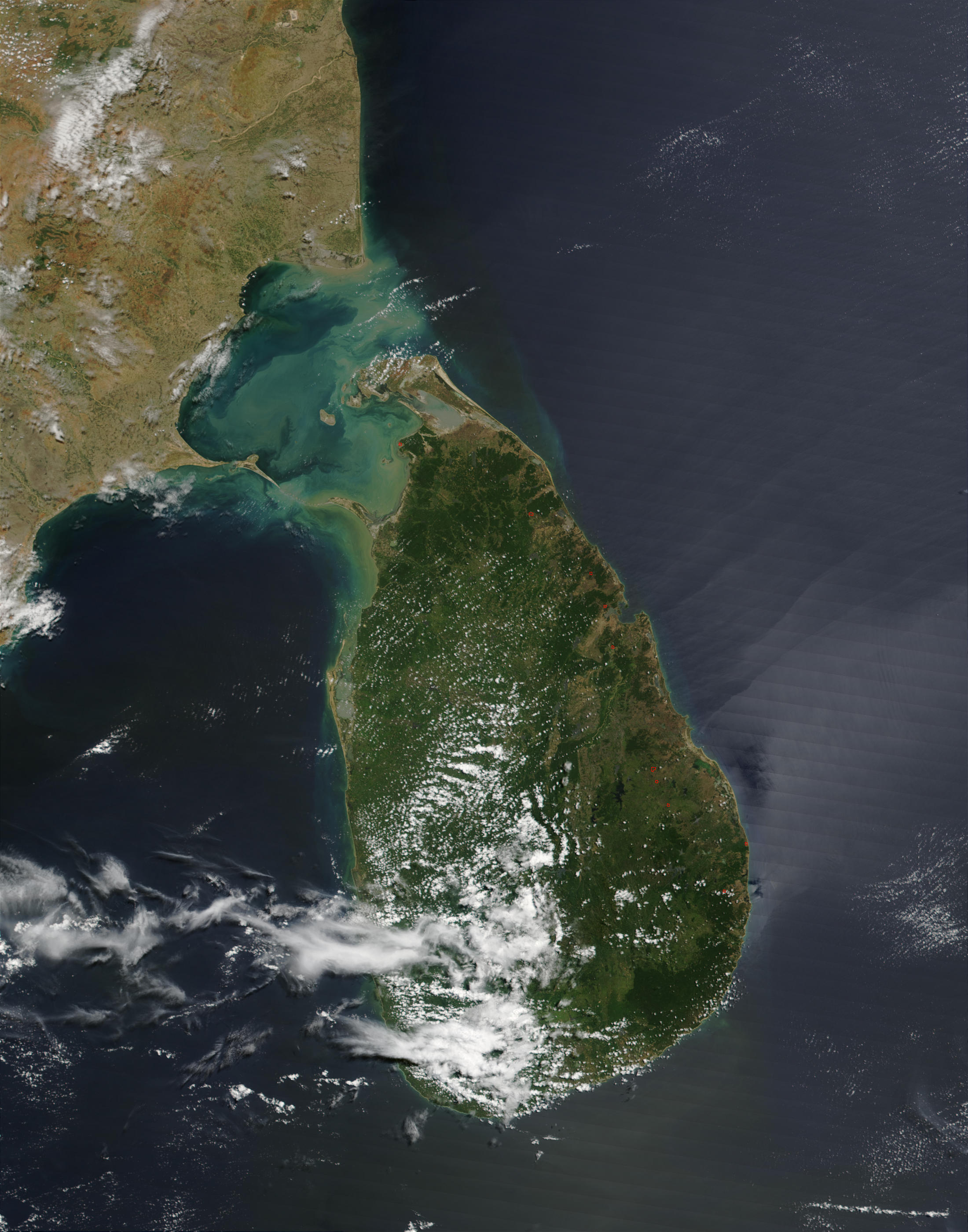
NASA satellite view of Sri Lanka revealing sparser areas of forest to the north and east of the island

Deforestation is one of the most serious environmental issues in Sri Lanka. Sri Lanka's current forest cover as of 2017 was 29.7%. In the 1920s, the island had a 49 percent forest cover but by 2005 this had fallen by approximately 26 percent. (29.40% in 2018) or 24-35%. Between 1990 and 2000, Sri Lanka lost an average of 26,800 ha of forests per year. This amounts to an average annual deforestation rate of 1.14%. Between 2000 and 2005 the rate accelerated to 1.43% per annum. However, with a long history of policy and laws towards environmental protection, deforestation rates of primary cover have decreased 35% since the end of the 1990s thanks to a strong history of conservation measures. The problem of deforestation in Sri Lanka is not as significant in the southern mountainous regions as it is in northern and lowland southern Sri Lanka, largely due to the nature of environmental protection.

== History ==
Forest clearing in nearly all parts of the dry zone can be traced back to Sri Lanka's hydraulic civilization, (Anuradhapura and Polonaruwa Kingdom period) when the forest cover in catchment areas in the wet zone was preserved undisturbed. However the gradual shifting of the capitals of Sri Lanka towards the wet zone 18th century enabled re-establishment of the dry zone forests that contain many valuable timber species. During the colonial period, under the Portuguese, Dutch there was considerable exploitation of prized timber, such as Ebony, Calamander and Nedun for export to the Europe, while Chena cultivation began to proliferate in the dry zone.

After British Ceylon period they gained control of the whole island in 1815 too there was heavy exploitation of dry zone forest for timber, especially between 1830 and 1870. The wet mid country and mountain forests that had remained intact were cleared rapidly for plantations of coffee and later tea. The forests of the low country wet zone were cleared for rubber and forests of the low and mid country wet zone and the intermediate zone were cleared for coconut. Even so, the close canopy natural forests stood at 80% in 1881.

Lter, with Sri Lanka (Dominion of Ceylon) rapid urbanization and steady population growth in the 1970s, mostly Sirimavo Bandaranaike's region, infrastructure projects destroyed forest areas. The construction of dams, road networks and the expansion of urban areas to meet the demands of a growing population have led to the loss of hundreds of thousands of hectares of forest.

The Civil War in Sri Lanka arose from ethnic tensions between the Sinhala people and the Tamil minority. The Liberation Tigers of Tamil Eelam also known LTTE stopped cutting trees in the areas they occupied because the trees provided them with leaves that allowed them to practice guerilla warfare. In response, the opposition - the national government - levelled forests in the hope of increasing the visibility if LTTE fighters. Large-scale cuts for this particular reason continued for decades until 2009.

Since then, growing population pressure has resulted in extensive deforestation to provide land for agriculture settlements and other development activates, and timber for construction and other uses. The timber exploitation and shifting cultivation have been particularly severe in the dry zone. To compound these problems, the forest policy in the mid-1960s was geared to harvest large quantities of the timber from natural forests in the belief that this was viable practice while maintaining an adequate protective forests cover in the island. This plan lead to the establishment of two large-scale play wood factories, a saw mill, and the State Timber Cooperation, facilitating the implementation of the decision to log 47,500 hectares of wet zone forests, including the Sinharaja and Kaneliya-Dediyagala-Nakiyadeniya (KDN) complex forests to feed that factories. Widespread public protest and a reorientation of forest policy in the early 1980s halted the logging in wet zone forests. This was followed by a moratorium on logging in the wet zone forests in 1988, which continues to be in force to date.

== Causes and impact ==
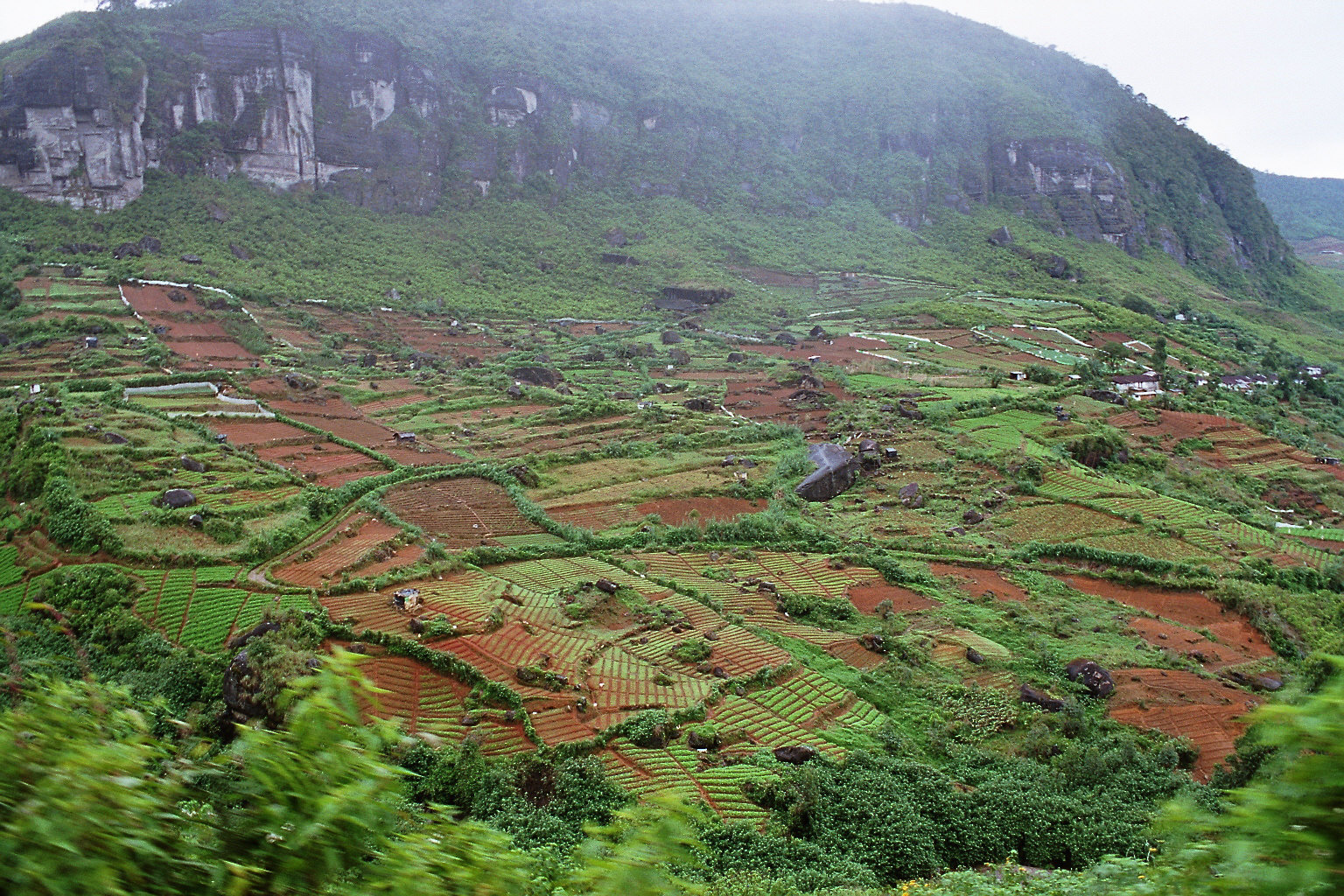
A vegetable farm revealing the way in which forest cover has been removed

The forests in Sri Lanka have been removed to make way for agricultural land and plantations and to provide fuel and timber. The sale of timber is a part of the national economy to raise revenue. The country is a major producer of tea and the land required for tea plantations is substantial. Population pressure is also a significant factor as is the removal of forested areas to make way for irrigation networks and paddy fields which was major process in the 1980s.

Large scale agricultural and settlement schemes without the recognition given for wild animal habitats and their migration patterns have been a major driver of deforestation and degradation, particularly in the dry zone, during the last century. Planted crops, such as sugar cane, banana, maize and paddy, in an unplanned manner, have led to ever-increasing human-elephant conflicts. Such schemes have led to drastic loss of habitats food access to water sources and migratory routes of the elephant, the largest herbivore having equally large home rangers. In addition, the increased vulnerability of wild elephants, now numbering around 6,000 to poaching has intensified the human-elephant conflict.

Riverine forests, often located outside the designated area network, are among the prime targets for modern-day agricultural development. If these forests could be conserved and maintained properly, they could serve as excellent wildlife corridors linking refugial forest fragments. Forest in the seasonal wet zone and intermediate zone have been either clear-felled for cash-crop agriculture or degraded, due to timber extraction or planting cardamom by removing the undergrowth. The remaining forests are too small, fragmented and isolated leading to their genetic impoverishment. Such forest contribute to the increased population density of the range of wildlife species which have now become pest species in agriculture fields. This has led to considerable crop losses and further to aggravated human-wildlife conflicts.

Mangrove forests and littoral woodlands have been cleared for settlements prawn farming and fire wood collection. This has accelerated sea erosion, salt water intrusion and land degradation.

Anthropogenic fires, particularly in savanna forests and grasslands, have led to the systematic degradation of forest habitats facilitating the spread of invasive species and consequently affecting natural regeneration of native species. Forest die-back observed in montane forests may lead to major changes in forest structure, composition and reduction in biodiversity.

Although laws and regulations have been enacted in recent times to address most of these issues, the views of the relevant implementing agencies are not always adequately consulted during major development initiatives. It is also regrettable that even the well-meaning suggestions of the conservation minded public are often over for the period from 2000 to 2005 is estimated to be about 29,800 ha at an annual deforestation rate of 1.5%.

=== Effects ===
Aside from the environmental implications deforestation in Sri Lanka has caused flooding, landslides and soil erosion from exposure of the deforested areas. It is also the primary threat to the survival of Sri Lanka's biodiversity. Sri Lanka has 751 known species of amphibians, birds, mammals and reptiles of which 21.7% are endemic, and over 3314 species of vascular plants, of which 26.9% are endemic.

== Tree cover extent and loss ==
Global Forest Watch publishes annual estimates of tree cover loss and 2000 tree cover extent derived from time-series analysis of Landsat satellite imagery in the Global Forest Change dataset. In this framework, tree cover refers to vegetation taller than 5 m (including natural forests and tree plantations), and tree cover loss is defined as the complete removal of tree cover canopy for a given year, regardless of cause.

For Sri Lanka, country statistics report cumulative tree cover loss of 233,609 ha (2,336.09 km^{2}) from 2001 to 2024 (about 5.9% of its 2000 tree cover area). For tree cover density greater than 30%, country statistics report a 2000 tree cover extent of 3,939,917 ha (39,399.17 km^{2}). The charts and table below display this data. In simple terms, the annual loss number is the area where tree cover disappeared in that year, and the extent number shows what remains of the 2000 tree cover baseline after subtracting cumulative loss. Forest regrowth is not included in the dataset.

Annual tree cover loss in Sri Lanka, 2001–2024. View chart definition.
Tree cover extent in 2000 minus cumulative tree cover loss in Sri Lanka, 2001–2024 (loss-only residual; does not account for gain). View chart definition.

Annual tree cover extent and loss
Year	Tree cover extent (km2) (Note: This residual measure does not include forest regrowth.)	Annual tree cover loss (km2)
2001	39,361.58	37.59
2002	39,327.31	34.27
2003	39,295.82	31.49
2004	39,239.83	55.99
2005	39,193.01	46.82
2006	39,115.71	77.30
2007	39,013.28	102.43
2008	38,948.28	65.00
2009	38,808.54	139.74
2010	38,736.22	72.32
2011	38,588.85	147.37
2012	38,444.57	144.28
2013	38,365.04	79.53
2014	38,241.54	123.50
2015	38,167.52	74.02
2016	37,992.62	174.90
2017	37,861.97	130.65
2018	37,730.36	131.61
2019	37,627.28	103.08
2020	37,515.12	112.16
2021	37,382.15	132.97
2022	37,298.04	84.11
2023	37,180.84	117.20
2024	37,063.08	117.76

== Forest conservation ==
Conservation of the environment is enshrined in the constitution of Sri Lanka and the state has pledged to protect, preserve and improve the enduement for the benefit for the community. At present, about 14% of the total land area of the island is managed for conservation purposes. The department of Forest Conservation manage about 50% of the island's natural vegetation. All activities in forests administered by it are governed by the Nation Forest Policy of 1995 and associated ordinances and enactments. the balance 45% is under the jurisdiction of the Department of Wildlife Conservation; all these forests are governed primarily by the Flora and Fauna Protection ordinance of 1937 and its subsequent revisions. However, the Land Reform Commission and the state Plantation Corporation and other plantation companies administer 25% of natural forests that are bordering tea, rubber and coconut plantations.

Department of Wild Life Conservation		Department of Forest Conservation	
Reserve Type (Number)	Extent (km^{2})	Reserve Type (Number)	Extent (km^{2})
Strict Natural Reserves (3)	315.75	Forest Reserves (366)	6,123.96
National Parks (20)	5,261.56	Conservation forests including Mangroves (65)	918.59
Natural Reserves (5)	570.56	National Heritage Wilderness areas (1)	111.27
Sanctuaries (61)	3,491.05	World Heritage Sites (2)	350.1
Jungle Corridors (1)	87.77	International Biosphere Reserves (3)	437.68

The distribution of the protected area between two government agencies is rather disproportionate. The majority of the small-sized yet biodiversity rich, wet zone forests are administered by the Forest Department. On the other hand, the large-sized forests, with comparatively less biodiversity within the intermediate and dry zones are vested with the Department of Wildlife Conservation. Among the internationally recognized forests of Sri Lanka Sinharaja low land and lower montane rain forest has been recognized for its outstanding universal value and hence has been declared as a Natural World Heritage Site and an International Man and Biosphere Reserve by UNESCO. Subsequently the Kanneliya-Nakiyadeniya-Dediyagala and the Biosphere Reserves for their exceptional biodiversity. The most recent inclusion to the prestigious list of Natural World Heritage Site is the Central Highlands of Sri Lanka, which include the Peak Wilderness Protected area, Horton Plains Natural Reserve and the wetland sites (Bundala, Kumana, ..)that are important for bird migration and conservation have been listed as internationally recognized RAMSAR site under the RAMSAR Convention on wetlands.

Although there exists a protected area system that includes major forest reserves in the island there still remains biodiversity rich forests outside this network that are worthy of protection. The foremost amongst these is the segments of the Ruakwana-Deniyaya forest range. These forest range is a hotspot within a hotspot exhibiting remarkable biological diversity. Then there are is orated hill of the intermediated and dry zone with most of the refugia of unique species, harbouring threatened biotic assemblages.

A resent study has shown that three such hill forests. viz, Moneragala, Kokagala and Dodanduwa kanda harbour 15% of the island endemic flora. Sinharaja there are small relict forest patches still carrying signature species of plants and animals that once existed in much large forest-scrapes. Some examples of these are the Moraella and Kosgama forests which are among the last vestiges of dipterocarp dominated lowland rain forest that were once more widespread in the wetter Dumbara Valley (<700m) in Panwila, Madulkele and Kelebokka areas of the Knuckles range. These forests have been replaced initially by coffee and later with tea in the 19th century by the British colonial period. Similarly the fresh-water swap forest in Waturana, Bulathsighala is also a relict of uniquely biodiverse ecosystem. Most of such swap forests have been covered to paddy lands in the past.

== Response ==
The government of Sri Lanka and international environmental organisations have made several steps to address the problem over the years, establishing national parks, reserves and sanctuaries, which now cover as much as 15 percent of the island's total area as of 2007. The Sinharaja Forest Reserve, which was established in 1978 to protect the nearly extinct tropical lowland rain forest, was flagged as a World Heritage Site in 1988.

=== History of environmental law and policy ===
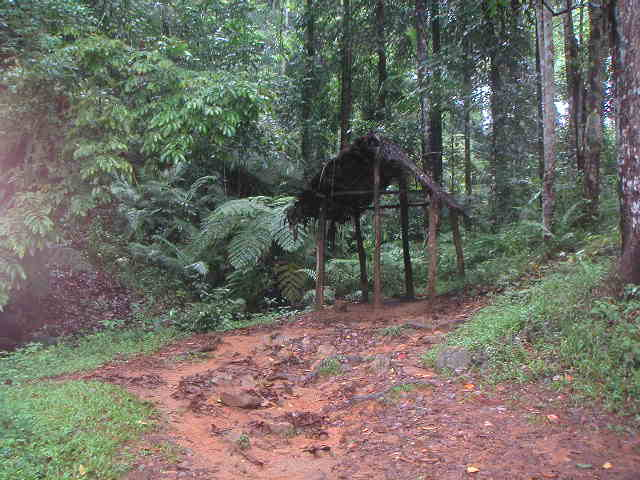
The Sinharaja Forest Reserve, protecting tropical lowland rain forest in Sri Lanka

The history of environmental policy and law in Sri Lanka however goes back much further in history. In 1848, the Timber Ordinance No.24 was signed for the reservation of forests, largely for timber production. In 1873, Hooker advocated the protection of natural forests above 5000 feet as climatic reserves and in 1938 a law was passed prohibiting the removal of forest above 5000 feet. In 1885 Forest Ordinance No. 10 for the Conservation of forests saw some protection of forests primarily for sustainable wood production but also some protection of wildlife in sanctuaries. This was developed further in 1907 with Forest Ordinance No 16 with some protection of forests and their products in reserved forests and village forests, again for the controlled exploitation of timber.

In 1929 the first authoritative forest policy statement was given in regards to species protection and in 1937 the Fauna and Flora Protection Ordinance No.2 was signed with the protection of wildlife in national reserves. However this was restricted in that in sanctuaries, in that habitats were only protected only on state land, with complete freedom to exploit privately owned land. In 1964 Amendment Act No.44 in 1964 saw the nature reserve and jungle corridor formally recognised as categories of Sri Lanka's protected areas national reserve. In 1970 Amendment Act No.1 saw the creation of an Intermediate zone to provide for controlled hunting, and the 1969 UNESCO Biological Programme and 1975 UNESCO Man and Biosphere Programme saw a move towards the marking of bio-climatic zones in Sri Lanka and new reserves proposed. In 1982 the Mahaweli Environmental Project established a network of protected areas to protect the effects of deforestation on wildlife and the upper catchments of the Mahaweli Ganga river. In 1988 the National Heritage Wilderness Area Act No.3 established a national heritage protection scheme of state land for those forests possessing a unique ecosystem, genetic resources, or outstanding natural features.

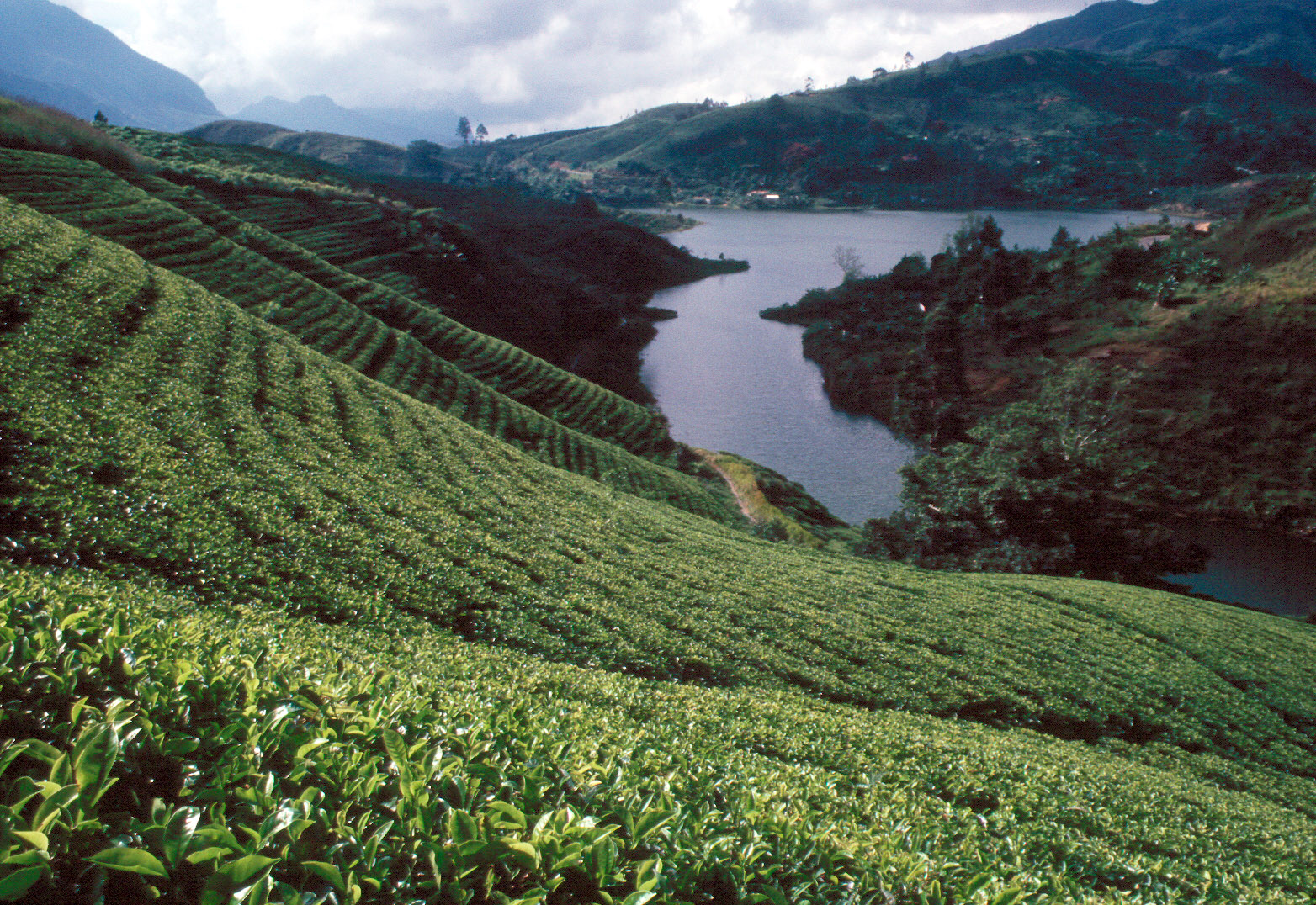
A tea plantation in Sri Lanka

In 1990, the National Policy for Wildlife Conservation was approved by the Sri Lankan cabinet with the prime objectives to the sustainability of ecosystems and ecological processes and the preservation of genetic diversity. The government also introduced a logging ban that was implemented in all natural forests in Sri Lanka under the Forestry Sector Development Programme. In 1993 Amendment Act No. 49 also added Refuge, marine reserves and buffer zones as additional formal categories to the definition of the national reserve. Deforestation rates of primary cover have since decreased 35% since the end of the 1990s following the combination of all of these policies and laws and notably the National Forest Policy of 1995 which is explained below.

=== Sustainable timber farming ===
One of the main threats to the sustainability of Sri Lanka's forests is government development policies in relation to the demand for timber and fuel and also the need to create plantations to raise revenue. The Sri Lankan government working in conjunction with multi-national institutions have seen a major change in timber harvesting in Sri Lanka for the cause of sustainable development. Commercial plantations have gradually been brought under management system in Sri Lanka to produce wood in an economically efficient and sustainable way. Other major sustainable forest plantation projects were also funded by IDA/World Bank, USAID and numerous integrated rural development projects operating in more than 10 districts of Sri Lanka.

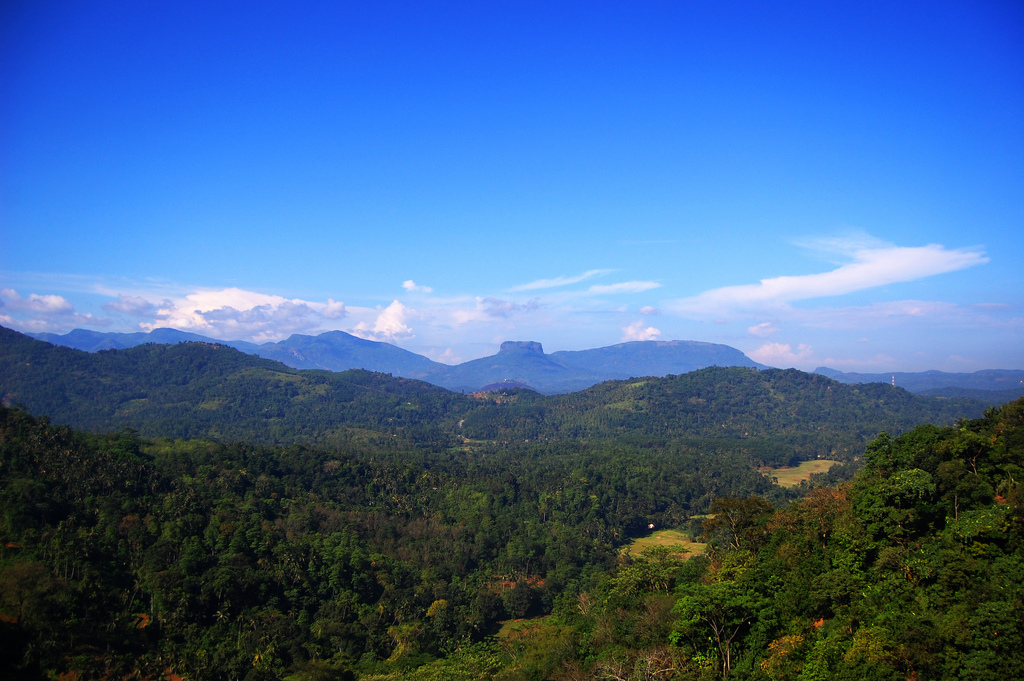
Forest en route from Batalegala to Kadugannawa

In 1995, the Sri Lankan government approved the National Forest Policy, with the specific focus on conservation and sustainability. The National Forest Policy, aside from protecting the environment directly, advocates increased community involvement and unity in forest management, providing leases to the private sector to manage multiple use production forests. The policy has also identified the need for collaboration to make sustainable forest management a reality, and has guided the state sector and farmers towards community organization in protecting the forests whilst meeting wood, raw material and the bio-energy requirements.

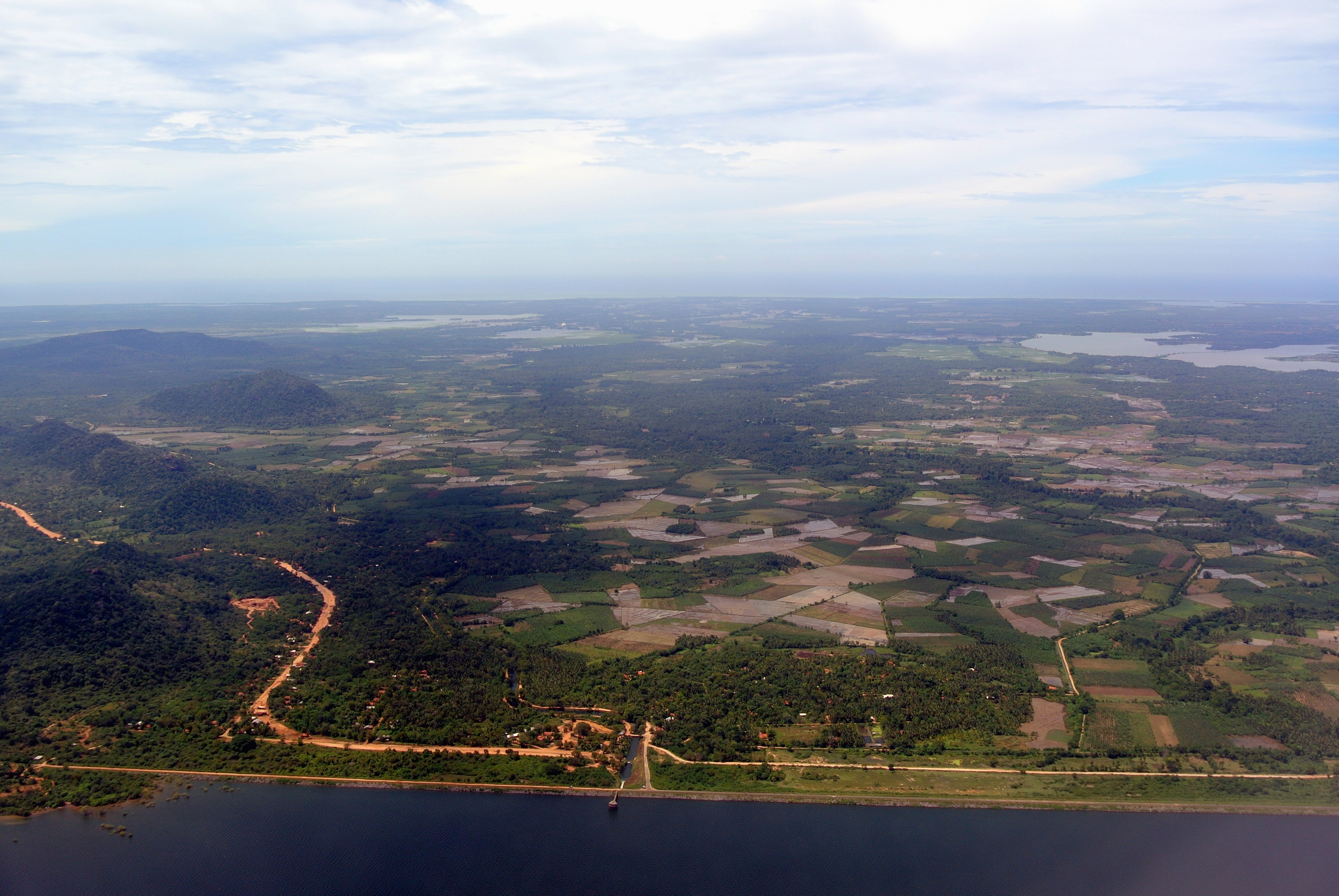
Aerial view of a reservoir and paddy fields

While illegal logging in Sri Lanka is not a major problem as it is in many countries, deforestation has still affected the lives of everyday people in some parts of Sri Lanka where removed forests meant that greater time and energy is spent gathering firewood typically by women who have to travel relatively long distances, affecting their health and well-being. Any degradation of the forest resource in Sri Lanka is dynamically related to the increasing demand for timber and fuel wood. Central to the sustainability of the forests of Sri Lanka in the future is the rate of population pressure and economic growth. Not only will a growing population demand more fuel, they will also place a higher demand for housing construction materials with wood. The increase in the demand for logs and poles is estimated from about 2.0 million M3 in 1995 to 2.7 million M3 in 2020 and during this period the requirement of biomass energy will increase from 9.0 to 9.7 million tons. Conflicts may arise between the goals of conservation and the demands for production that such pressures create. While a significant area of land is in practice protected by the central government, the government has often been unable to extend effective and universal control over every square kilometre of its protected areas. Villagers have been known to cut down forest illegally with serious pressure to meet energy needs, but overall illegal logging in Sri Lanka is relatively low compared to many countries affected by this environmental problem at the beginning of the 21st century.

== Forest recovery ==
Within limits, any particular forest is capable of counteracting anthropogenic impacts such as extraction of non-timber forest products, timber harvesting and encroachment for agriculture (e.g. tea, rubber and Chena cultivation) and fire etc. the commonest timber harvesting method is the selective logging by which trees of selected species that are over a certain girth or diameter are felled. Data on species before and after timber harvest in initially primary forest are lacking. Even in logged forests, recordings of species or individual three inventories along with marking of study plots or transects are exceptionally rare. This makes reasonable accurate monitoring of biodiversity changes subsequent to timber harvesting almost impossible. However, the National Conservation Review (NCR) project that was conducted in Sri Lanka (except in the North and the East) during 1991-1996 has provided an invaluable data base on flora, fauna, soils and hydrology with protected areas in Sri Lanka. The data thus generated are of great use for subsequent monitoring of the biodiversity changes that taken place in various forest site that were constrained due to timber extraction.

== REDD+ forest reference level and monitoring ==
Sri Lanka has made a national forest reference level (FRL) submission under the UNFCCC REDD+ framework, which was subject to a UNFCCC technical assessment. On the UNFCCC REDD+ Web Platform, Sri Lanka’s 2017 submission is listed as having an assessed reference level; the other Warsaw Framework elements (national strategy, safeguards, and a national forest monitoring system) are listed as “not reported” on the platform.

In its FRL (as modified during the technical assessment), Sri Lanka selected two REDD+ activities at national scale: “reducing emissions from deforestation” and “enhancement of forest carbon stocks” (treated as afforestation and reforestation). The assessed FRL values were 4,365,000 t CO2 eq per year for deforestation and −72,000 t CO2 eq per year for enhancement of forest carbon stocks. The benchmark represents average annual historical emissions and removals estimated over 2000–2010 and proposed for application to the 2011–2015 period, without an adjustment for national circumstances.

The technical assessment reports that Sri Lanka derived activity data from global forest cover-change products supplemented by a national forest cover map and an accuracy assessment using the OpenForis/Collect Earth tools with very high-resolution imagery, and applied default emission factors from the 2006 IPCC Guidelines. The FRL included above-ground biomass, below-ground biomass and litter carbon pools and CO2 only, while excluding soil organic carbon and deadwood; the assessment team noted that soil organic carbon is significant in Sri Lanka’s forests and identified a stepwise pathway for improvement, including strengthening the national forest inventory and satellite monitoring systems and expanding future FRLs to include forest degradation.
