= Wilfred de Soysa =

Ceylonese entrepreneur, land proprietor and philanthropist

Sir Wilfred de Soysa
- Born: 20 February 1884; Colombo, Ceylon
- Died: 3 May 1968 (aged 84)
- Education: Royal Agricultural College
- Occupations: Tea, rubber, coconut planter
- Known for: Entrepreneurship, philanthropy
- Spouse: Evelyn de Soysa (m. 1907)
- Children: 8, including Harold and Ryle
- Father: Sir Charles Henry de Soysa

Sir Lambert Wilfred Alexander de Soysa, also known as Sir Wilfred de Soysa (20 Feb 1884 - 3 May 1968), was a Ceylonese entrepreneur, landed proprietor and philanthropist. He was the seventh son of Sir Charles Henry de Soysa and Lady Catherine de Soysa. Born at Alfred House Colombo and educated privately, then at Royal College, Colombo and Prince of Wales' College, Moratuwa, he completed his studies at the Royal Agricultural College, England.

De Soysa was successful as a tea, rubber and coconut planter and established the firm De Soysa & Co. He was also a member of the Ceylon National Association and part of the Lanka Mahajana Sabha delegation to the Donoughmore Commission. He was a proprietor of the Ceylon Morning Leader newspaper, and played host to the young Hirohito and Rabindranath Tagore. He was knighted in the 1938 New Year Honours as a Knight Bachelor.

De Soysa married Senator Evelyn Yohana (née Fernando) and their first son Harold de Soysa was the first Ceylonese Anglican Bishop of Colombo. His second son Cecil de Soysa was the founding Chairman of the Ceylon Tourist Board and the Chairman of Ceylon Shipping Lines. In 1954 his third son Terence de Soysa was appointed as the first Sri Lankan Chairman of the Ceylon Chamber of Commerce. His fourth son Ryle de Soysa was the opening batsman for the All-Ceylon (national team) from 1938 to 1945, and represented the Oxford University, the Sinhalese Sports Club (of which he was later president) and captained the Royal College, Colombo first XI team to Australia in 1936.
