= Evelyn de Soysa =

Ceylonese politician (1893–1973)

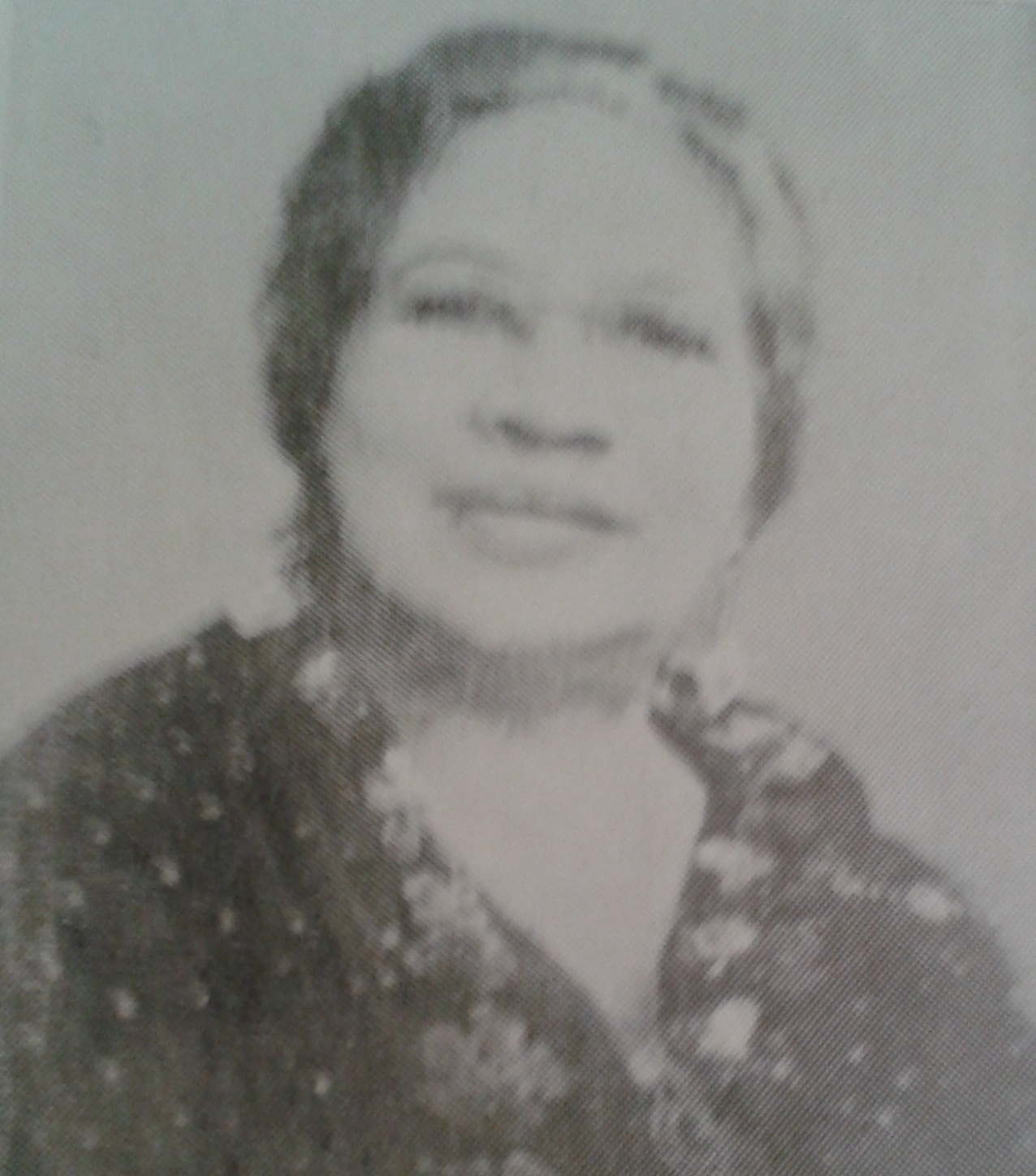
Lady Evelyn de Soysa

Lady Evelyn Johanna Publina de Soysa OBE (née Fernando) (23 April 1893 – 28 July 1973) was the third female member of the Senate of Ceylon.

Evelyn Johanna Publina Fernando was born 23 April 1893 in Moratuwa, the daughter of Juan Fernando. She was educated at the Princess of Wales' College in Moratuwa.

On 23 November 1907 she married Ceylonese entrepreneur and philanthropist Wilfred de Soysa. They had eight children: their first son Harold de Soysa was the first Ceylonese Anglican Bishop of Colombo and their second son Cecil de Soysa was the founding Chairman of the Ceylon Tourist Board and the Chairman of Ceylon Shipping Lines. The couple's third son Terence de Soysa was appointed as the first Sri Lankan Chairman of the Ceylon Chamber of Commerce Their fourth son Ryle de Soysa was the opening batsman for the All-Ceylon (national team) from 1938–45 and represented Oxford University and the Sinhalese Sports Club and captained the Royal College, Colombo first XI team to Australia in 1936.

In 1949 she co-founded the Association of Ceylon Women in the UK (now known as Sri Lankan Women's Association in the UK), with Laurel Casinader, which is the longest surviving Lankan association in London. De Soysa served as the Association's inaugural president from 1949 until 1951. In 1950 she was awarded an MBE and in 1956 an OBE, for her work in social services and charities.

In April 1959 de Soysa was appointed as a member of the Senate of Ceylon and remained a senator until 1963.

She died on 28 July 1973 at the age of 80.
