= Harold de Soysa =

Anglican Bishop of Colombo, Sri Lanka

Right Reverend Harold de Soysa
- Bishop of Colombo
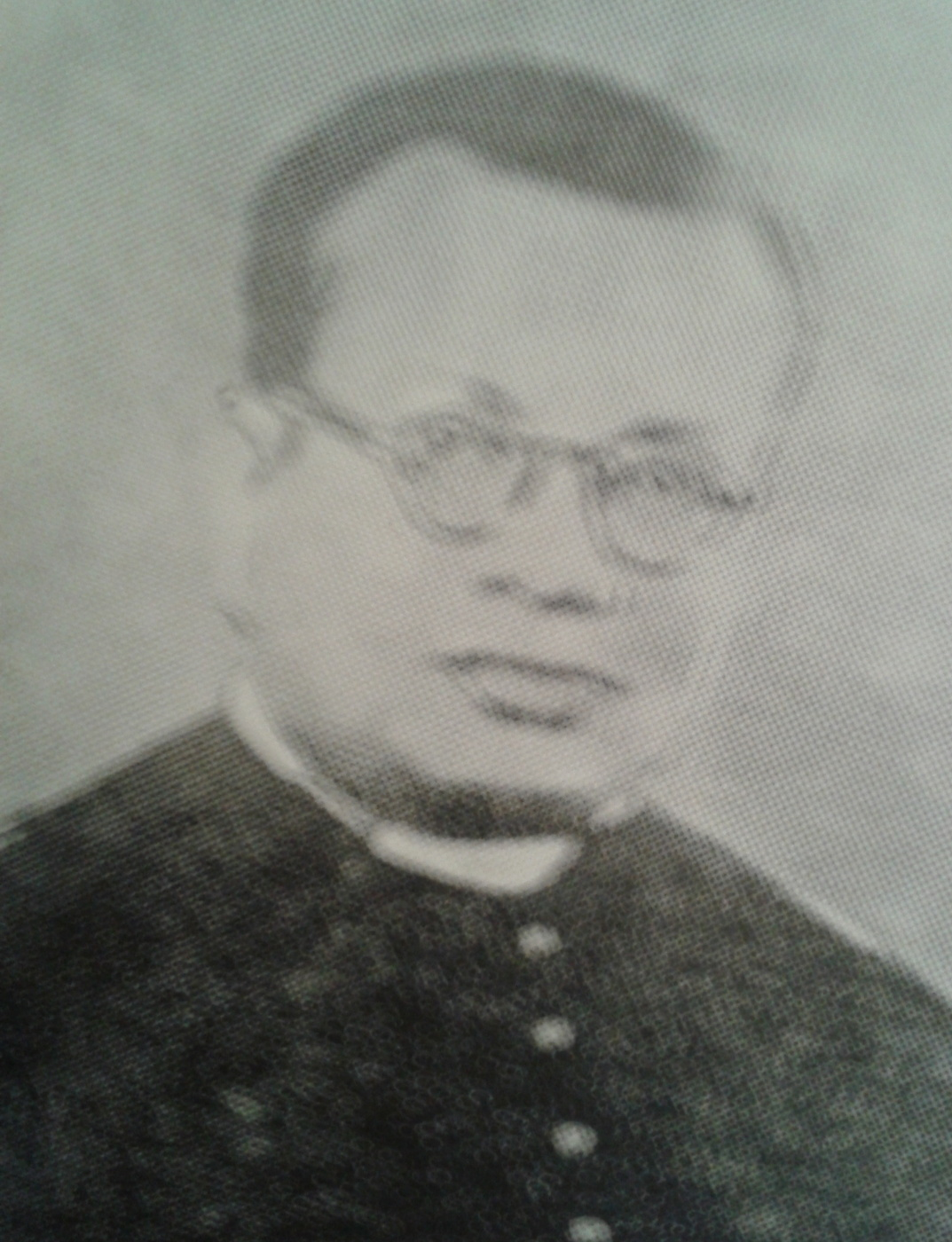
- Church: Anglican Church of Ceylon
- See: Anglican Diocese of Colombo
- In office: 1964 — 1971
- Predecessor: Bishop Graham Campbell
- Successor: Cyril Lindon Abeynaike
- Previous post: Archdeacon of Colombo

Orders
- Ordination: Cuddesdon

Personal details
- Born: 1907 Ceylon (Sri Lanka)
- Died: 1971 (aged 63–64)

Charles Harold Wilfred de Soysa MA (1907-1971) was the first Ceylonese Anglican Bishop of Colombo, Sri Lanka.

Born to Sir Wilfred and Lady Evelyn de Soysa, he was educated at Royal College, Colombo and graduated from Oriel College, Oxford, obtaining Second Class Honours in Theology. Thereafter, he was trained for the Priesthood at Cuddesdon College and was ordained in 1934 at St Paul's Cathedral.

After working in England for a short period, he returned to Ceylon to serve in Kandy and Moratuwa. He was the Principal of the Colombo Divinity School and was made the Archdeacon of Colombo in 1955. In 1964 he became the first Ceylonese Bishop of Colombo and was one of only two Bishops of Colombo to be elected uncontested.

He played a very important role in the Ecumenical Movement and the Church Union. In fact, his work in this area was so well recognised that he was one of three delegates appointed by the Archbishop of Canterbury, Dr. Michael Ramsey in the Anglican-Roman Catholic conversations.

He was instrumental in the construction of the Cathedral of Christ the Living Saviour, in Cinnamon Gardens, Colombo. He died before its completion in 1971 and was interred at the Cathedral. His younger brother, Ryle de Soysa, was a first-class cricketer.

== See also ==
- Church of Ceylon
- Anglican Bishop of Colombo
- Anglican Diocese of Colombo
- Theological College of Lanka

Religious titles
Preceded by Bishop Graham Campbell	Bishop of Colombo; 1964 – 1971	Succeeded by Cyril Lindon Abeynaike
