= Ryle de Soysa =

Sri Lankan cricketer

Personal information
- Full name: Gahmini Ryle Johannes de Soysa
- Born: 21 June 1917; Colombo, Western Province, British Ceylon
- Died: 13 January 2002 (aged 84); Colombo, Western Province, Sri Lanka
- Batting: Left-handed
- Bowling: Leg break googly

Domestic team information
- Years: Team
- 1938–1939: Oxford University
- 1944/45: Ceylon

Career statistics
Competition	First-class
Matches	8
Runs scored	314
Batting average	20.93
100s/50s	–/2
Top score	67
Balls bowled	32
Wickets	2
Bowling average	7.50
5 wickets in innings	–
10 wickets in match	–
Best bowling	2/15
Catches/stumpings	–/–
- Source: Cricinfo, 29 May 2020

Gahmini Ryle Johannes de Soysa (21 June 1917 – 13 January 2002) was a Sri Lankan first-class cricketer and entrepreneur.

The son of Wilfred and Evelyn de Soysa, he was born at Colombo in June 1917. He was educated in Colombo at Royal College, captaining the school in a five-match tour of Australia, which was the first time a school team from Ceylon had toured abroad. He later studied in England at Oriel College at the University of Oxford. While studying at Oxford, he played first-class cricket for Oxford University, making his debut against Yorkshire at Oxford in 1938. He made three further appearances in 1938 for Oxford, before making a final appearance in 1939 against the combined Minor Counties cricket team. While at Oxford, he toured Jamaica with a combined Oxford and Cambridge Universities team, making two first-class appearances against Jamaica. For Oxford University, de Soysa scored 241 runs at an average of 26.77 and with a high score of 67. The influence of Frank Woolley on his batting was noted, particularly his late cuts and driving.

After graduating from Oxford, he returned to Ceylon where he coached the Royal College XI. De Soysa made a final first-class appearance for All-Ceylon against India at Colombo. For many years he worked for the family tea, rubber and coconut exporting business. He became president of the Singhalese Sports Club in 1997, then a team with first-class status, but had to step down the following year due to ill health. De Soysa died at Colombo in January 2002. His elder brother was Harold de Soysa, the first Ceylonese Anglican Bishop of Colombo.
