= Rollo Graham Campbell =

The Rt. Revd. Archibald Rollo Graham Campbell CBE (18 February 1903 – 11 April 1978) was an Anglican bishop in the mid-20th century.

Graham Campbell was born in London, the son of Rollo F. Graham-Campbell. He was educated at Eton and King's College, Cambridge, and after a period of study at Cuddesdon College was ordained deacon in 1926 and priest in 1927. His career began with a curacy of St John, Middlesbrough. Next he was an Assistant Master at his old school and then Vicar of St Paul's, King Cross. From 1942 until 1948 he was Fellow, Dean and Chaplain of his old college. In 1948 he became Anglican Bishop of Colombo, a post he held for 16 years. He was then Rector of Kislingbury until his retirement in 1968. He died as the result of injuries sustained in a snowstorm car crash.

Church of England titles
Preceded by Cecil Douglas Horsley	Bishop of Colombo; 1948 – 1964	Succeeded by Charles Harold Wilfred de Soysa
