= Ceylon Chamber of Commerce =

The Ceylon Chamber of Commerce
- Founded: 25 March 1839; 187 years ago
- Founder: Rt. Hon. J. A. Stewart Mackenzie, Governor of Ceylon
- Type: NPO
- Purpose: Business advocacy & federation
- Location: 50 Nawam Mawatha, Colombo 00200
- Coordinates: 6.918661°N 79.850074°E
- Key people: Krishan Balendra (Chairperson); Bingumal Thewarathanthri (Vice chairperson); Vinod Hirdaramani (Deputy vice chairperson); Buwanekabahu Perera (Secretary General and CEO)
- Website: www.chamber.lk

The Ceylon Chamber of Commerce is the oldest and one of leading business chambers in Sri Lanka. It is a confederation of trade associations, regional- and sectoral chambers of commerce and industry, business councils and employer organisations in the country.

== History ==
The Ceylon Chamber of Commerce was established on 25 March 1839, when Sri Lanka was known as Ceylon under British rule.

Rt. Hon. James Alexander Stewart-Mackenzie, then Governor of Ceylon, was instrumental to found the Ceylon Chamber of Commerce as he was keenly interested in promoting agriculture and trade in Ceylon.

A meeting was held on 20 February 1839 by a considerable number of the mercantile community favourable to the establishment of a Chamber of Commerce in the island of Ceylon. It was unanimously resolved as a preliminary measure that five of the gentlemen present should be requested to form a Committee for framing an estimate and drawing up certain rules and regulations, which when submitted and approved might form the ground work of the institution.

The General Meeting of thirteen representatives of the mercantile community was held on 25 March 1839 at the Corner House of Prince Street. With the adoption of the rules and regulations of the Ceylon Chamber of Commerce, the first Chamber was established in Sri Lanka.

Subsequently, in 1895 the Chamber was incorporated by the then Legislative Council under the Ceylon Chamber of Commerce Ordinance No. 10 of 1895. In 1954 Terrence de Soysa was appointed as the first Sri Lankan Chairman.

== See also ==
- International Chamber of Commerce
