= Coconut production in Sri Lanka =

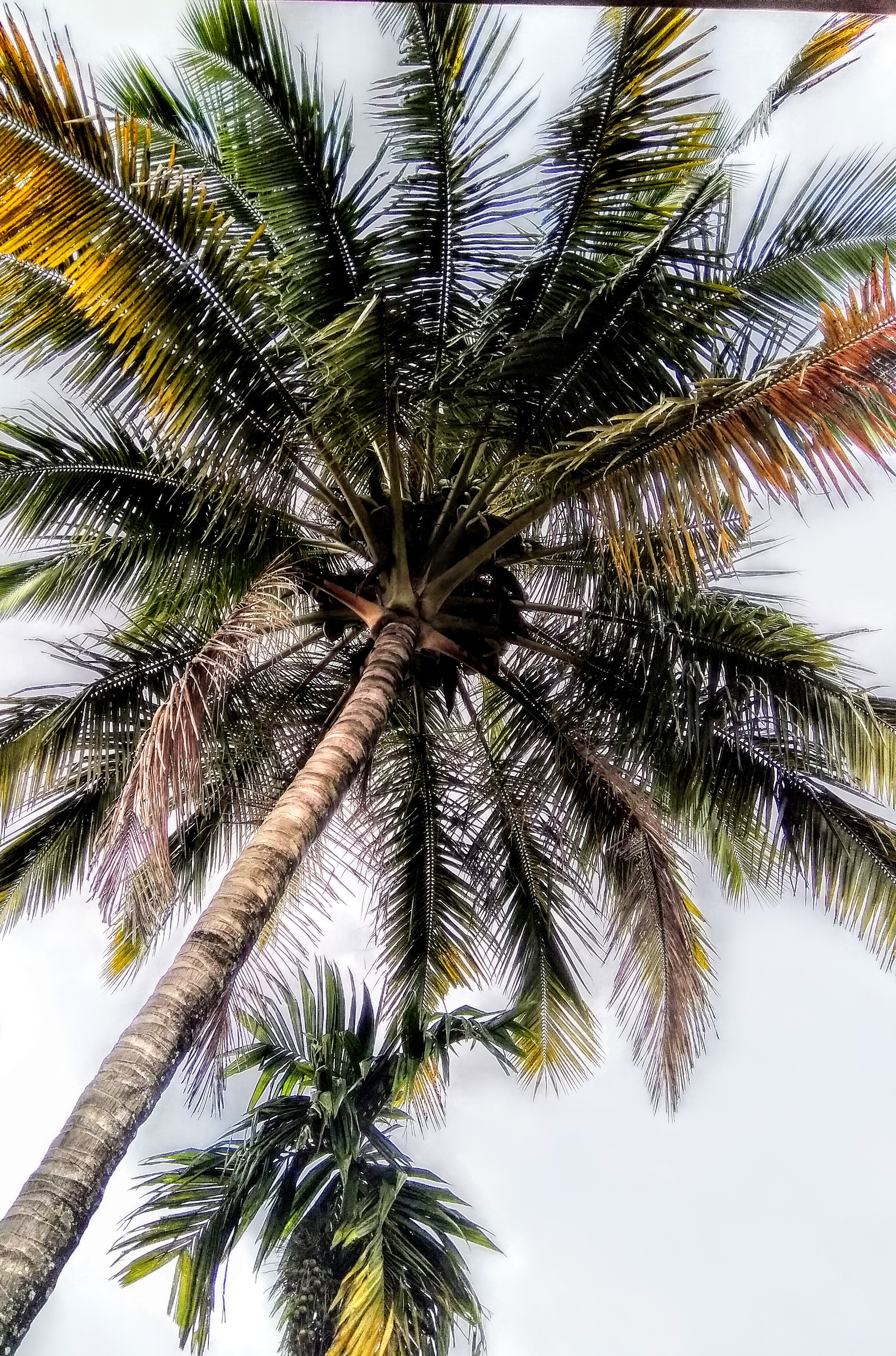
Sri Lankan coconut tree in Mirissa beach.

Coconut production contributes to the national economy of Sri Lanka. The scientific name of the coconut is Cocos nucifera. Sri Lanka there are three varieties, tall variety, dwarf variety and King coconut variety. According to figures published in December 2018 by the Food and Agriculture Organization of the United Nations, it is the world's fourth largest producer of coconuts, producing 2,623,000 tonnes in 2018.

== History ==
The Portuguese who captured the country in 1505 called the nut Coco as the peeled nut was very unattractive. Coconut native to South-East Asia and Sri Lanka. Marco Polo, the Italian merchant and explorer who made to the west was among the first Europeans to describe the coconut. It's also reported that he referred to Sri Lanka as the most picturesque island in the world. In Sidat Sangarawa the coconut has been referred to as Nyli. In the Sigiri kurutu gee written about the 9th century. The idea has been expressed by the Professor Senarat Paranavitana, the reputed archaeologist that the breasts of the Sigiri damsels have been referred to as Neli. The Mahawansa states that the coconut was cultivated during the reign of King Aggabodhi (564–598). Faxian Buddhist monk (337–422) in his travel noted records the presence of coconut in Sri Lanka. The Kotte period (1412–1597) of the 15th century under Parakramabahu VI (1410–1467) is considered the golden era of Sinhala literature. The Paravi SandesayaI, the Selalihini Sandesaya, the Hansa Sandaseya, and the Gira Sandesaya makes reference to the coconut.

When the British capered the coastal area, the various taxes imposed included a tax on the coconut palm. It is significant that words like Polwatta, Polgolla, Polgasowita, Polgahawela, Polhengoda, Polathumodera have in common the word pol (Coconut). There is ample evidence that coconut was present during the Anuradhapura period (377 BC–1017 AD).

=== Myths and legends ===
There is evidence that the word Pol (පොල්), Tēṅkāy (தேங்காய்) was not used for the coconut in very early times. It is believed that Vijaya on landing in Tambapaṇṇī was treated with young coconut water by Kuweni.

== Distribution ==
Coconut palms grow in most parts of Sri Lanka except in higher elevations. It's a strong, light, and demanding tree. Most of the coconut is concentrated in the triangle formed by Puttalam, Kurunegala and Gampaha. This area covered by these three towns is referred to as the Coconut Triangle.

=== Natural habitat ===
The coconut palm has made Sri Lanka a particularly beautiful place. The graceful trunk of the tree rises to a height up to 30 m (98 ft) ending in a compact crown of 30-40 large feather like leaves. Each leaf is about3–4 m (9.8–13.1 ft) in length. It consists of a leaf stalk or petiole, a midrib and a large number of leaflets arranged in two opposite rows. The leaflets near the base of the leaf as well as near the apex are much shorter and narrower than those near the middle. Each fruit has three coverings an outer shiny layer, the epicarp which is green to start with but becomes brown as the nut matures (except in the king coconut where it is orange). Inner to this is the husk, the mesocarp, which cushions the seed, acting like a spring which breaks the fall of the fruit. The husk is not damaged by salt water and the coconut can be carried to long distances by the sea because the coconut is adapted to floatation. Inside the husk is a hard woody shell, the endocarp.

=== Varieties and forms of coconut found in Sri Lanka ===
Common name	Features
CRIC 60	Annual production of seedlings - 1,000,000 nuts, Yield 12,000 nuts/ha/year
Gon Thembili	Annual production of seedlings - 5,000 nuts. Yield 20,000 nuts/ha/year
Pora pol	
Ran Thembili	
Kapruwana	Reach to the bearing stage with in 3–4 years
King Coconut	Intermediate stature, autogenous, homogeneous, fruits in 6–7 years, seasonal flower production, medium-sized nuts with orange epicarp and sweet nut water, 25-50 nuts per bunch
Nawasi Thembili	
Rathran Thembili	Certified variety with brown sticker. Suitable for home gardens
Green Dwarf	Hybrid variety, annual production of seedlings - 2,000 nuts. Certified variety with black sticker. Yield 20,000 nuts/ha/year

== Uses ==
=== Leaves ===
The tender inner stem and the terminal bud called the palm cabbage is considered as a delicacy by some. The very young leaves (Gok kolla) are yellowish and shiny. There is reference ti the use of Gok leaves decorations in the ancient literary work Kawsilumina written during the Polonnaruwa period (1055–1232). Gok leaves are used for decoration on occasions such as wedding receptions, religious functions and sometimes even at funerals. In the Poruwa or wedding dais on which the bride and bridegroom stand while religious ceremonies are performed, tender Gok leaflets are used to beautify the structure. The Pirith mandapa (පිරිත් මණ්ඩප) or chamber in which the bhikkus chant pitith are also constructed using gok and dried leaflets.

The mature fronds are pleated or woven to make baskets and are also used in the partitioning of houses or thatching roofs in houses of poorer homes and covering the roofs of temporary structures . The green leaf is split down the midrib and the leaflets of each side is cross woven making what is called "cadjans". The midrib of the leaflets are made into eakle brooms after the leaf blade on each side has been removed. The mature inflorescences are taken out and used un decorations after the spathes which encloses the flowers are split. The inflorescences are placed in pots which are placed in the 4 corners of the pirith mandapaya or Poruwa.

=== Toddy and serape ===
Toddy (Pol ra,பொல் ரா,පොල් රා) is obtained by tapping the juice exuded from the young inflorescence of the coconut while it is still covered by the spathe. It is a very refreshing drink, called sweet toddy, non intoxicating and pleasant if taken when freshly drawn. In preparing to obtain sweet toddy, the inflorescence is tied up tight before opening with string and the free end is sliced off. If the end gets parched, fresh slices are cut off. A pot is hung beneath the cut end of the inflorescence into which the juice from the bruised inflorescence collects. A good tree can yield a litre of sweet toddy per day with sugar content up to 14%. The instruments carried by the tapper are a little wooden mallet (used as a hammer for tapping) and a curved knife for slicing carried on the belt across his waist. Close to the crowns two strong ropes connect adjacent trees. The toddy tapper walks on one holding to the other. By this the tapper has no need to descend one tree and climb the next one for tapping. The unfermented toddy can be boiled and thickened to produce treacle, or further boiled to thicken more and finally poured into clean coconut shells to form a solid called jaggery which is used in the preparation of sweetmeats and other delicacies.

==== Arrack ====
Most of arrack made for the fermented sap of coconut flowers. Sri Lanka is the largest producer of coconut arrack in the world. 50 million liters in 2020. Distilleries major arrack production company in Sri Lanka. Due to its concentrated sugar and yeast content, the captured liquid naturally and immediately ferments into a mildly alcoholic drink called "toddy", tuak, or occasionally "palm wine". Within a few hours after collection, the toddy is poured into large wooden vats, called "wash backs", made from the wood of teak or Berrya cordifolia. The natural fermentation process is allowed to continue in the washback until the alcohol content reaches 5-7% and deemed ready for distillation.

Distillation is generally a two-step process involving either pot stills, continuous stills, or a combination of both. The first step results in "low wine", a liquid with an alcohol content between 20 and 40%. The second step results in the final distillate with an alcohol content of 60 to 90%. It is generally distilled to between 33% and 50% alcohol by volume (ABV) or 66 to 100 proof. The entire distillation process is completed within 24 hours. Various blends of coconut arrack diverge in processing, yet the extracted spirit may also be sold raw, repeatedly distilled or filtered, or transferred back into halmilla vats for maturing up to 15 years, depending on flavour, colour and fragrance requirements.
