= Rubber production in Sri Lanka =

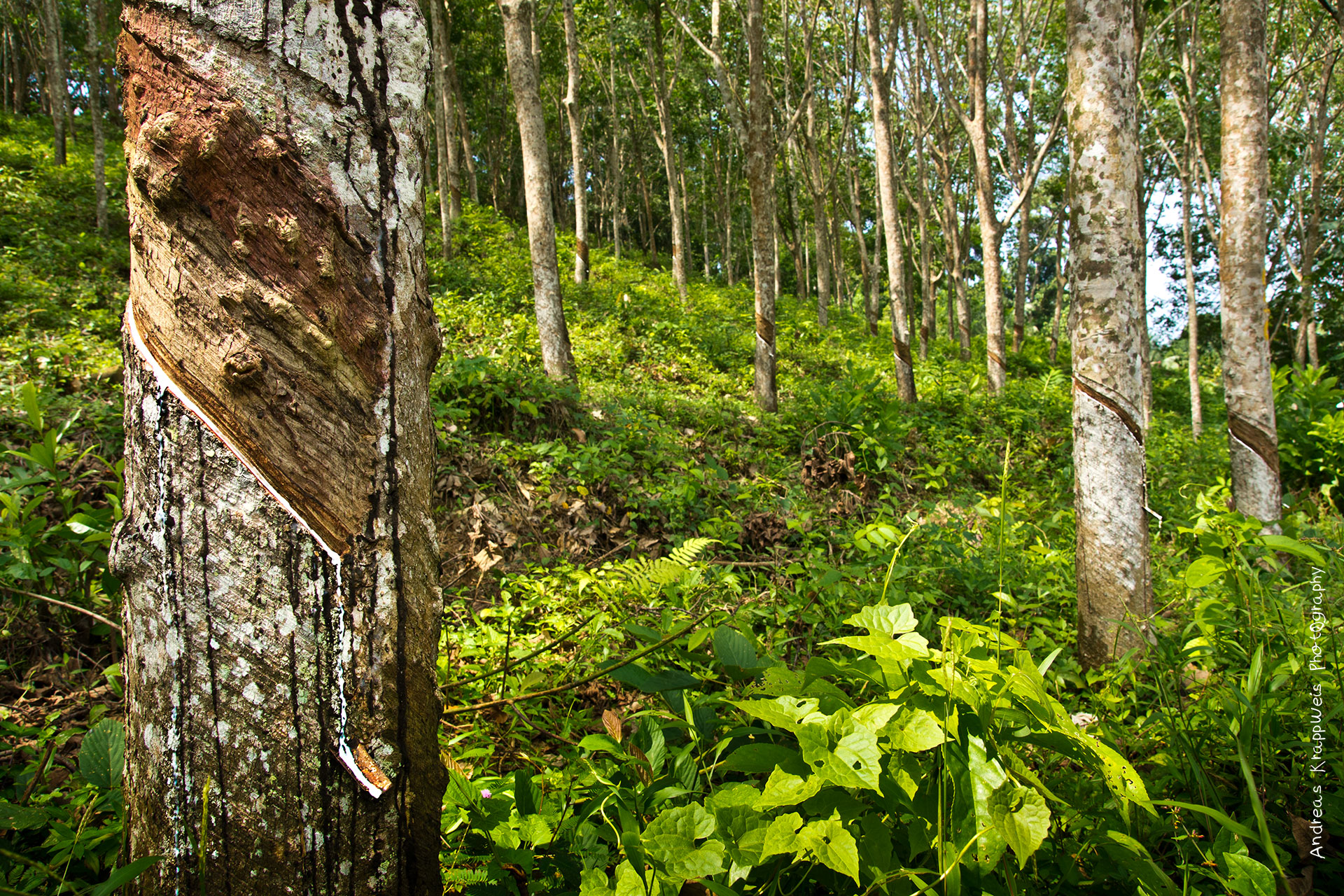
Rubber plantation in Southern Province

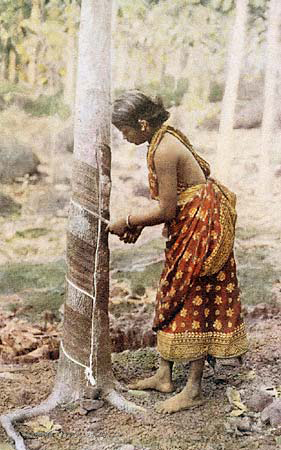
A woman in Sri Lanka harvesting rubber, c. 1920

Rubber production in Sri Lanka commenced in 1876, with the planting of 1,919 rubber seedlings at the Henarathgoda Botanical Gardens in Gampaha. The total extent under rubber in 1890 was around 50 ha (120 acres) and in the early 1900s it increased to around 10,000 ha (25,000 acres). By 1982 the total extent under rubber was around 180,000 ha (440,000 acres) and the total annual production was 125,000,000 kg (276,000,000 lb). However, the total extent under rubber declined subsequently and at present it is around 120,000 h (430,000 ks)a. Rubber contributes about 0.6% of the total GDP. According to figures published in 2018 by the Rubber Research Institute of Sri Lanka, producing 82,600,000 kg (182,100,000 lb) in 2018.

== History ==
On 12 August 1876, the Colonial Office, on the recommendation of Sir Joseph Hooker, sent 38 cases containing 1,919 rubber seedlings from Kew Gardens to Ceylon. The seedlings were germinated from seeds collected by Sir Henry Wickham in Brazil earlier that year. With a further 300 seedlings sent in late 1876/early 1877. Ceylon was selected by the Colonial Office as the most suitable site to cultivate and propagate the rubber plants, for further distribution to other comparable regions in the Indian subcontinent. The seedlings were planted at the Henarathgoda Botanical Gardens in Gampaha, under the guidance of George Thwaites, the Garden's superintendent. In 1877 twenty-two of these young trees were sent to Singapore, and the seedlings from those trees were distributed throughout Malaysia and Borneo. In 1879 twenty-eight plants were sent to India and Burma. The first of the rubber trees in Ceylon flowered in 1881, and the first experiments in tapping subsequently commenced shortly afterwards. In 1893 over 90,000 seeds were supplied to planters throughout Ceylon, in 1900 there was approximately 405 hectares (1,001 acres) of rubber being cultivated and by 1923 there was over 180,085 hectares (445,000 acres).

== Current cultivation ==
The traditional rubber growing districts of Sri Lanka are located mainly in the wet zone and include Colombo, Gampaha, Kalutara, Kandy, Matale, Galle, Matara, Kurunegala, Ratnapura and Kegalle. There is currently over 127,500 ha (315,000 acres) of land under rubber cultivation. A significant proportion of the extent under this crop is cultivated by smallholders. There had been a drop in the extent cultivated in these four districts during the last 20 years. The drop is more pronounced in Kalutara and Ratnapura districts where there is a drop by around 29%. In Kegalle district, the corresponding value is 25%. Rubber is also grown in the districts of intermediate zones of the country. The topography of theses rubber lands vary from flat too very steep. At present about 47,000 ha (120,000 acres) 40% of the rubber lands in the country are managed by 19 regional plantation companies, 68,000 ha (170,000 acres) belong to the private sector. Out of the 115,300 ha (285,000 acres), about 25,700 ha (64,000 acres) (22%) are immature and the balance 89,600 ha (221,000 acres) (78%) are mature. The size of rubber holdings vary widely. Those holdings below 8 ha (20 acres) are considered smallholdings. Rubber lands of extent 8 ha (20 acres) or more are considered as estates. In the year 2005, around 77,000 ha (190,000 acres) (65% of the total extend under the rubber) were in the smallholder sector and 37,000 ha (91,000 acres) (35% of the total extend under the rubber) were in the estate sector.

Distribution of Rubber lands (hectares)
District	2014	2010	1992	1982
Colombo	6,466	6,320	10,084	10,317
Gampaha	3,289	3,835	4,840	3,364
Kaluthara	24,195	28,765	41,237	47,632
Kandy	1,643	1,854	2,079	2,127
Matale	1,190	4,005	2,530	6,637
Nuwara Eliya	27	6		224
Galle	4,356	5,982	11,234	14,637
Matara	3,101	4,005	5,299	6,637
Hambanthota	210	155	23	67
Kurunagala	3,244	3,018	3,229	3,290
Puttlam	17	193		
Badulla	1,601	1,626	340	969
Monaragala	5,876	4,805	1,539	2,192
Ratnapura	22,065	26,605	29,926	29,329
Kegalle	34,453	37,165	45,794	45,919

== Production of rubber ==
A few decades ago, seedling rubber was planted but at present vegetative propagated rubber accounts to nearly 70% of cultivated rubber. The variety PB 86 predominates but clones of the RRIC 100 series such as RRIC 121 and RRISL 2000 series developed by the Rubber Research Institute are increasingly used in new and replanting. These new varieties are characterised by high yields and a number of other desirable feature.

== Rubber exports ==
At present nearly 60% of the rubber produced is used locally and the balance in exported. In 1997, the corresponding value was 42%. Thus, the local consumption of rubber has considerably increased during the last decade. Rubber is exported as smoked sheet, sole crepe, latex crepe and Technically Specified Rubber (TSR). In 2007 18,100,000 kg (39,900,000 lb) sheets were exported. Rubber contributing over US$ 890 million in 2019 to the economy of Sri Lanka. Sri Lanka government aims to growth rubber industry US$ 2 billion by 2025.

Year	Natural rubber (mil. USD)	Total Export (mil. USD)
2000	25.5	220
2001	15	205
2002	19.6	214
2003	34.7	275
2004	54.5	353
2005	43	414
2006	86.6	507
2007	96.5	587
2008	110	652
2009	85.6	487
2010	151	722
2011	193	1070
2012	115	938
2013	68.4	947
2014	44.9	907
2015	29	728
2016	33.4	768
2017	43.2	824
2018	39.5	794
2019		890
2020		786

== See also ==
- Agriculture in Sri Lanka
- Economy of Sri Lanka
