= List of trees of Cambodia =

The following 'List of Tree Species' in Cambodia has been based on one prepared in 2004 with the support of DANIDA project; the original document gives Khmer names for species shown here (with corrections and links).

Genus	Species	Family	Comments
Acacia	Acacia auriculiformis	Mimosaceae	assumed correct
Acacia	Acacia farnesiana	Mimosaceae	assumed correct
Acacia ?	Senegalia intsia	Fabaceae: Mimosoideae	was listed here as "Acacia intsii" [sic]
Adina	Adina cordifolia	Rubiaceae	assumed correct
Aegle	Aegle marmelos	Rutaceae	assumed correct
Afzelia	Afzelia bijuga	Fabaceae: Caesalpinioideae	assumed correct
Afzelia	Afzelia xylocarpa	Fabaceae: Caesalpinioideae	valuable timber sp.
Aglaia	Aglaia spectabilis	Meliaceae	Listed under synonym: A. gigantea
Aglaia	Aglaia odorata	Meliaceae	assumed correct
Albizia	Albizia lebbek	Mimosaceae	assumed correct
Albizia	Albizia myriophylla	Mimosaceae	assumed correct
Amomum	Amomum krevanh	Zingiberaceae	Sp. not in WP list: this refers to a flower
(unknown)	"Anacardiac spondias"	Anacardiaceae ?	refers to Spondias = svay chanti?
Anacardium	Anacardium occidentale	Anacardiaceae	is cashew
Ancistrocladus	Ancistrocladus harmandii	Ancistrocladaceae	assumed correct
Anisoptera	Anisoptera costata	Dipterocarpaceae	assumed correct
Anogeissus	Anogeissus acuminata	Combretaceae	s. corr.
Antidesma	Antidesma cochinchinensis	Phyllanthaceae	assumed correct
Aporosa	Aporosa filicifolia	Phyllanthaceae	Was placed in Euphorbiaceae
Aquilaria	Aquilaria crassna	Thymelaeaceae	assumed correct
Ardisia	Ardisia helferiana	Myrsinaceae	sp. not listed in En WP
Artocarpus	Artocarpus rigidus	Moraceae	assumed correct
Artocarpus	Artocarpus sampor	Moraceae	sp. not listed in En WP
Atalantia	Atalantia citroides	Rutaceae	sp. yet to be included in En WP
Avicennia	Avicennia officinalis	Verbenaceae	s. corr.: is the Indian Mangrove
Azadirachta	Azadirachta indica	Meliaceae	is the Indian neem tree
Baccaurea	Baccaurea ramiflora	Phyllanthaceae	Was placed in Euphorbiaceae
Bambusa	Bambusa arundinacea	Poaceae	assumed correct
Barringtonia	Barringtonia acutangula	Lecythidaceae	assumed correct
Bauhinia	Bauhinia acuminata	Fabaceae: Caesalpinioideae	assumed correct
Bauhinia	Bauhinia pulla	Fabaceae: Caesalpinioideae	assumed correct
Boerhavia	Boerhavia chinensis	Nyctaginaceae	assumed correct
Bombax	Bombax ceiba	Malvaceae: Bombacoideae	Was listed as Bombacaceae
Borassus	Borassus flabellifer	Arecaceae	Not on Danida list
Bouea	Bouea oppositifolia	Anacardiaceae	genus to be included in En WP
Breynia	Breynia rhamnoides	Phyllanthaceae	Was placed in Euphorbiaceae
Bruguiera	Bruguiera sexangula	Rhizophoraceae	assumed correct
Butea	Butea monosperma	Fabaceae: Faboideae	assumed correct
Calamus	Calamus spp.	Arecaceae	almost certainly a number of rattan spp., which are lianas
Calophyllum	Calophyllum calaba	Guttiferae	assumed correct
Calophyllum	Calophyllum dryobalanoides	Guttiferae	assumed correct
Calophyllum	Calophyllum inophyllum	Guttiferae	assumed correct
Cananga	Cananga latifolia	Annonaceae	assumed correct
Canarium	Canarium pimela	Burseraceae	assumed correct
Capparis	Capparis micracantha	Capparidaceae	assumed correct
Carallia	Carallia brachiata	Rhizophoraceae	assumed correct
Cardiospermum	Cardiospermum halicacabum	Sapindaceae	assumed correct
Careya	Careya arborea	Lecythidaceae	assumed correct
Carissa	Carissa cochinchinensis	Apocynaceae	s. corr.
Cassia	Cassia garettiana	Fabaceae: Caesalpinioideae	assumed correct
Cassia	Cassia javanica	Fabaceae: Caesalpinioideae	assumed correct
Cassia	Cassia siamensis	Fabaceae: Caesalpinioideae	assumed correct
Casuarina	Casuarina equisetifolia	Casuarinaceae	assumed correct
Ceriops	Ceriops decandra	Rhizophoraceae	assumed correct
Chukrasia	Chukrasia tabularis	Meliaceae	genus appears to be monotypic
Cinnamomum	Cinnamomum cambodianum	Lauraceae	assumed correct
Cinnamomum	Cinnamomum cassia	Lauraceae	assumed correct
Cinnamomum	Cinnamomum polydelphum	Lauraceae	assumed correct
Combretum	Combretum quadrangulare	Combretaceae	assumed correct
Cratoxylum	Cratoxylum formosum	Hypericaceae	assumed correct
Crudia	Crudia chrysantha	Fabaceae: Detarioideae	assumed correct
Crypteronia	Crypteronia paniculata	Crypteroniaceae	assumed correct
Cynometra	Cynometra ramiflora	Fabaceae: Detarioideae	assumed correct
Dacrydium	Dacrydium elatum	Podocarpaceae	assumed correct
Dalbergia	Dalbergia bariensis	Fabaceae: Faboideae	very valuable timber sp.
Dalbergia	Dalbergia cambodiana	Fabaceae: Faboideae	Not on Danida list;
Dalbergia	Dalbergia cochinchinensis	Fabaceae: Faboideae	very valuable timber sp.
Dalbergia	Dalbergia nigrescens	Fabaceae: Faboideae	assumed correct
Dasymaschalon	Dasymaschalon lomentaceum	Annonaceae	genus to be included in En WP
Dehaasia	Dehaasia cuneata	Lauraceae	assumed correct
Delonix	Delonix regia	Fabaceae: Caesalpinioideae	Introduced (from Madagascar)
Dialium	Dialium cochinchinensis	Fabaceae: Caesalpinioideae	assumed correct
Dillenia	Dillenia ovata	Dilleniaceae	assumed correct
Dimocarpus	Dimocarpus longan subsp. malesianus Leenh.	Sapindaceae	"Euphoria cambodiana" Lecomte (as in list) is a synonym for the longan
Dioscorea	Dioscorea hispida	Dioscoreaceae	probably a liana?
Diospyros	Diospyros bejaudi	Ebenaceae	assumed correct
Diospyros	Diospyros buxifolia	Ebenaceae	assumed correct
Diospyros	Diospyros crumenata	Ebenaceae	assumed correct
Diospyros	Diospyros mollis	Ebenaceae	assumed correct
Diospyros	Diospyros nitida	Ebenaceae	assumed correct
Diospyros	Diospyros pilosanthera	Ebenaceae	assumed correct
Diospyros	Diospyros sylvatica	Ebenaceae	assumed correct
Dipterocarpus	Dipterocarpus alatus	Dipterocarpaceae	assumed correct
Dipterocarpus	Dipterocarpus costatus	Dipterocarpaceae	assumed correct
Dipterocarpus	Dipterocarpus intricatus	Dipterocarpaceae	assumed correct
Dipterocarpus	Dipterocarpus obtusifolius	Dipterocarpaceae	assumed correct
Dipterocarpus	Dipterocarpus retusus	Dipterocarpaceae	assumed correct
Dipterocarpus	Dipterocarpus tuberculatus	Dipterocarpaceae	assumed correct
Dracaena	Dracaena cambodiana	Asparagaceae	Formerly Agavaceae
Dysoxylum	Dysoxylum loureiri	Meliaceae	assumed correct
Elaeis	Elaeis guineensis	Arecaceae	is oil palm: introduced
Eucalyptus	Eucalyptus camaldulensis	Myrtaceae	assumed correct
Eugenia	Eugenia malaccense	Myrtaceae	sp. not listed in En WP
Fagraea	Fagraea fragrans	Loganiaceae	assumed correct
Fibraurea	Fibraurea tinctoria	Menispermaceae	genus to be included in En WP
Garcinia	Garcinia ferrea	Guttiferae	sp. not listed in En WP
Garcinia	Garcinia hanburyi	Guttiferae	assumed correct
Garcinia	Garcinia merguensis	Guttiferae	sp. not listed in En WP
Garcinia	Garcinia schomburgkiana	Guttiferae	sp. yet to be included in En WP
Gardenia	Gardenia angkoriensis	Rubiaceae	sp. yet to be included in En WP
Gardenia	Gardenia cambodiana	Rubiaceae	sp. yet to be included in En WP
Gluta (syn. Melanorrhoea)	Gluta laccifera	Anacardiaceae	original s. corr. to "Melanorrhoea laccifera"; also listed under Gluta
Grewia	Grewia asiatica	Malvaceae: Grewioideae	(was listed as Tiliaceae)
Heritiera ("Terrietia")	Heritiera javanica	Malvaceae: Sterculioideae	was listed as Sterculiaceae; listed as "Terrietia javanica": Tarrietia is a synonym.
Homalium	Homalium brevidens	Salicaceae	Previously placed in the defunct "Flacourtiaceae"; sp. not listed in En WP
Homalium	Homalium tomensosum	Salicaceae	ditto
Hopea	Hopea ferrea	Dipterocarpaceae	assumed correct
Hopea	Hopea helferi	Dipterocarpaceae	assumed correct
Hopea	Hopea latifolia	Dipterocarpaceae	Not on Danida list
Hopea	Hopea pedicellata	Dipterocarpaceae	Not on Danida list
Hopea	Hopea odorata	Dipterocarpaceae	assumed correct
Hopea	Hopea pierrei	Dipterocarpaceae	assumed correct
Hydnocarpus	Hydnocarpus annamensis	Achariaceae	Previously placed in defunct "Flacourtiaceae"
Hymenocardia	Hymenocardia wallichii	Phyllanthaceae	Was placed in Euphorbiaceae
Irvingia	Irvingia malayana	Simaroubaceae	assumed correct
Khaya	Khaya senegalensis	Meliaceae	assumed correct
Knema	Knema globularia	Myristicaceae	assumed correct
Lagerstroemia	Lagerstroemia calyculata	Lythraceae	assumed correct
Lagerstroemia	Lagerstroemia floribunda	Lythraceae	assumed correct
Leucaena	Leucaena leucocephala	Fabaceae: Mimosoideae	s. corr.: this may be an invasive species
Litchi	Litchi chinensis	Sapindaceae	is the lychee
Lithocarpus	Lithocarpus elegans	Fagaceae	assumed correct
Litsea	Litsea pierrei	Lauraceae	assumed correct
Madhuca	Madhuca elliptica	Sapotaceae	assumed correct
Mammea (Ochrocarpos)	Mammea siamensis	Calophyllaceae	listed as Ochrocarpus siamensis [sic]: Guttiferae
Mangifera	Mangifera flava	Anacardiaceae	Not on Danida list
Mangifera	Mangifera indica	Anacardiaceae	Listed as "Anacardiac mangifera" = pon ormbork is mango
Mangifera	Mangifera sylvatica	Anacardiaceae	Not on Danida list
Manilkara	Manilkara hexandra	Sapotaceae	assumed correct
Markhamia	Markhamia stipulata	Bignoniaceae	Listed as "M. stipulacea" (nearest?)
Melaleuca	Melaleuca leucadendra	Myrtaceae	assumed correct
Memecylon	Memecylon floridum??	Melastomaceae	changed from "Memecylon floribundum" which is not listed
Mesua	Mesua ferrea	Guttiferae	assumed correct
Millingtonia	Millingtonia hortensis	Bignoniaceae	assumed correct
Moringa	Moringa oleifera	Moringaceae	assumed correct
Mucuna	Mucuna pruriens	Fabaceae: Faboideae	liana sp.
Nephelium	Nephelium hypoleucum	Sapindaceae	assumed correct
Ochna	Ochna harmandii	Ochnaceae	assumed correct
Parinari	Parinari anamensis Hance	Chrysobalanaceae	Not on Danida list
Peltophorum	Peltophorum dasyrrhachis	Fabaceae: Caesalpinioideae	assumed correct
Peltophorum	Peltophorum ferrugineum	Fabaceae: Caesalpinioideae	assumed correct
Pentapetes	Pentapetes phoenica	Malvaceae: Dombeyoideae	was listed as Sterculiaceae; this herb is in a monotypic genus, yet to be included in En WP
Phyllanthus	Phyllanthus amarus	Phyllanthaceae	s. corr. & was placed in the Euphorbiaceae
Phyllanthus	Phyllanthus emblica	Phyllanthaceae	ditto - this is kantout prei, an edible fruit.
Pinus	Pinus latteri	Pinaceae	assumed correct
Podocarpus	Podocarpus neriifolius	Podocarpaceae	assumed correct
Polyalthia	Polyalthia cerasoides	Annonaceae	assumed correct
Psychotria	Psychotria revesii	Rubiaceae	assumed correct
Pterocarpus	Pterocarpus macrocarpus	Fabaceae: Faboideae	assumed correct
Pterocymbium	Pterocymbium tinctorium	Malvaceae: Sterculioideae	was listed as Sterculiaceae
Rhizophora	Rhizophora mucronata	Rhizophoraceae	assumed correct
Rhodomyrtus	Rhodomyrtus tomantosa	Myrtaceae	assumed correct
Sandoricum	Sandoricum indicum	Meliaceae	assumed correct
Schleichera	Schleichera oleosa	Sapindaceae	s. corr.
Sesbania	Sesbania grandiflora	Fabaceae: Faboideae	assumed correct
Shorea	Shorea roxburghii	Dipterocarpaceae	listed as S. cochinchinensis (synonym)
Shorea	Shorea farinosa	Dipterocarpaceae	assumed correct
Shorea	Shorea obtusa	Dipterocarpaceae	assumed correct
Shorea	Shorea siamensis	Dipterocarpaceae	Not on Danida list
Shorea	Shorea vulgaris	Dipterocarpaceae	name unresolved
Sindora	Sindora siamensis	Fabaceae: Caesalpinioideae	listed as S. cochinchinensis (synonym)
Sindora	Sindora tonkinensis	Fabaceae: Caesalpinioideae	Not on Danida list
Spondias	Spondias pinnata	Anacardiaceae	assumed correct
Stephania	Stephania rotunda	Menispermaceae	s. corr.
Sterculia	Sterculia foetida	Malvaceae: Sterculioideae	was listed as Sterculiaceae
Sterculia	Sterculia parviflora	Malvaceae: Sterculioideae	ditto
Stereospermum	Stereospermum chelonoides	Bignoniaceae	assumed correct
Stereospermum	Stereospermum cylindricum	Bignoniaceae	assumed correct
Strychnos	Strychnos nux-vomica	Loganiaceae	assumed correct
Swietenia	Swietenia macrophylla	Meliaceae	assumed correct
Swintonia	Swintonia pierrei	Anacardiaceae	assumed correct
Tamarindus	Tamarindus indica	Fabaceae: Caesalpinioideae	is tamarind (domestic)
Tectona	Tectona grandis	Verbenaceae	assumed correct
Terminalia	Terminalia bialata	Combretaceae	assumed correct
Terminalia	Terminalia cambodiana	Combretaceae	name unresolved
Terminalia	Terminalia catappa	Combretaceae	assumed correct
Terminalia	Terminalia chebula	Combretaceae	assumed correct
Terminalia	Terminalia corticosa	Combretaceae	assumed correct
Terminalia	Terminalia tomentosa	Combretaceae	assumed correct
Terminalia	Terminalia triptera	Combretaceae	assumed correct
Tetrameles	Tetrameles nudiflora	Tetramelaceae	includes famous spung tree growing through Ta Prohm (no longer in Datiscaceae)
Toona	Toona sureni	Meliaceae	assumed correct
Tristania	Tristania merguensis	Myrtaceae	assumed correct
Vatica	Vatica odorata	Dipterocarpaceae	assumed correct
Vatica	Vatica philastraena	Dipterocarpaceae	s. corr.
Vitex	Vitex pinnata	Verbenaceae	assumed correct
Wrightia	Wrightia religiosa	Apocynaceae	assumed correct
Xylia	Xylia xylocarpa	Fabaceae: Mimosoideae	Listed as X. dolabriformis (synonym)
Xylopia	Xylopia pierrei	Annonaceae	Not on Danida list

== See also ==
- Wildlife of Cambodia
- Seasonal tropical forest
- Deforestation in Cambodia
