= Kwini =

Kwini may refer to:

- Mangifera odorata, a species of plant with edible fruit similar to the related mango
- Yeidji, an Aboriginal Australian people (also known as Gwini or Kuini)

== See also ==
- Kuini (disambiguation)
