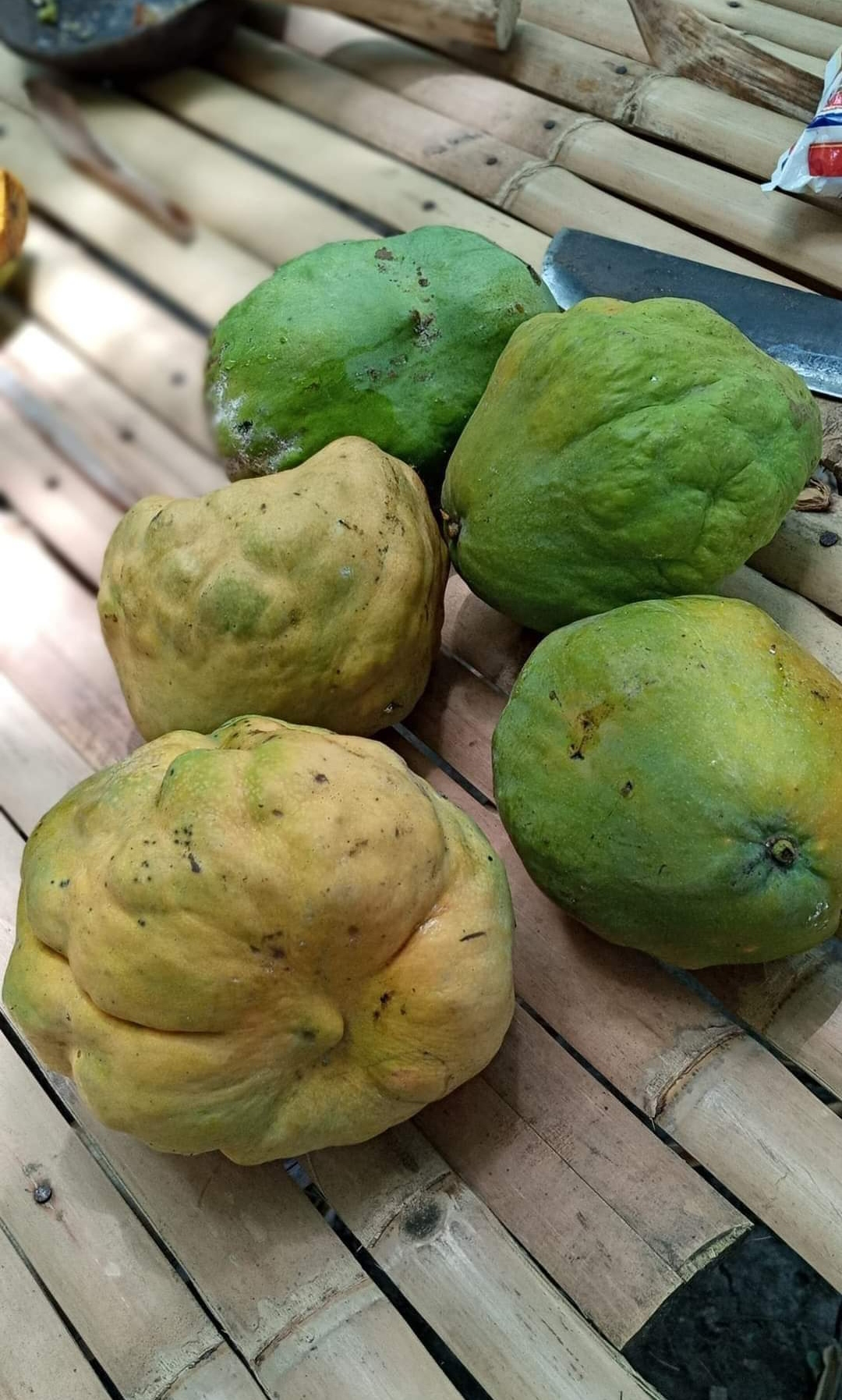
- Sumbawa mango

Conservation status
- Vulnerable (IUCN 2.3)

Scientific classification
- Kingdom: Plantae
- Clade: Tracheophytes
- Clade: Angiosperms
- Clade: Eudicots
- Clade: Rosids
- Order: Sapindales
- Family: Anacardiaceae
- Genus: Mangifera
- Species: M. sumbawaensis

Binomial name
- Mangifera sumbawaensis Kosterm.

= Mangifera sumbawaensis =

Species of flowering plant

Mangifera sumbawaensis is a species of plant in the family Anacardiaceae. It is endemic to Indonesia. It is native to Sumbawa.

Mangifera sumbawaensis is an evergreen tree, it can grow up to 40 metres (130 ft) tall. The bole can be free of branches for up to 25 m (82 ft) and up to 60 cm (24 in) in diameter, sometimes with small buttress.

The fruit is harvested from the wild for local use as food.
