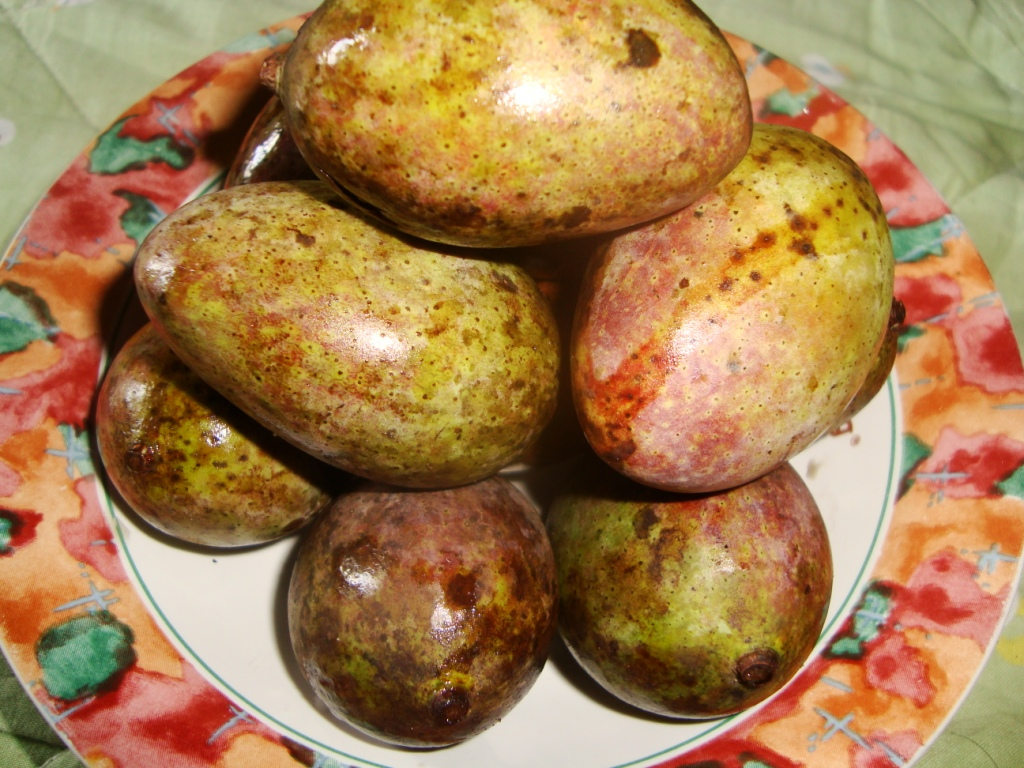

Conservation status
- Extinct in the Wild (IUCN 3.1)

Scientific classification
- Kingdom: Plantae
- Clade: Tracheophytes
- Clade: Angiosperms
- Clade: Eudicots
- Clade: Rosids
- Order: Sapindales
- Family: Anacardiaceae
- Genus: Mangifera
- Species: M. casturi

Binomial name
- Mangifera casturi Kosterm.

= Mangifera casturi =

Species of tree

Mangifera casturi (also called Kalimantan mango or kasturi) is a species of plant in the family Anacardiaceae. It was endemic to the Kalimantan region of Borneo, but is now considered extinct in the wild.

== Description ==
=== Vegetative characteristics ===
Mangifera casturi is an evergreen, slow-growing, 10–30 m tall tree with more than 1 m wide trunks at maturity. The sapwood is pale yellow.

=== Generative characteristics ===
The slightly compressed, ovoid, green to purple-black or brown, shiny, fragrant, 6 cm long fruit with dark orange, fragrant, fibrous, pleasant-tasting pulp weighs 50–84 g and bears polyembryonic seeds.

== Taxonomy ==
It was described by André Joseph Guillaume Henri Kostermans in 1993. The type specimen was collected in Kalimantan, Borneo.

=== Etymology ===
The specific epithet casturi is derived from kasturi, the local name of the species.

== Distribution and habitat ==
It was native to the area near Banjarmasin, Kalimantan, Borneo, but is now extinct in the wild.

== Conservation ==
It is extinct in the wild, due to illegal logging, but it persists in cultivation and is grown in several ex-situ collections in botanical gardens. It has been propagated using tissue culture.

== Uses ==
Mangifera casturi is used for its edible, sweet fruit and for its wood.
