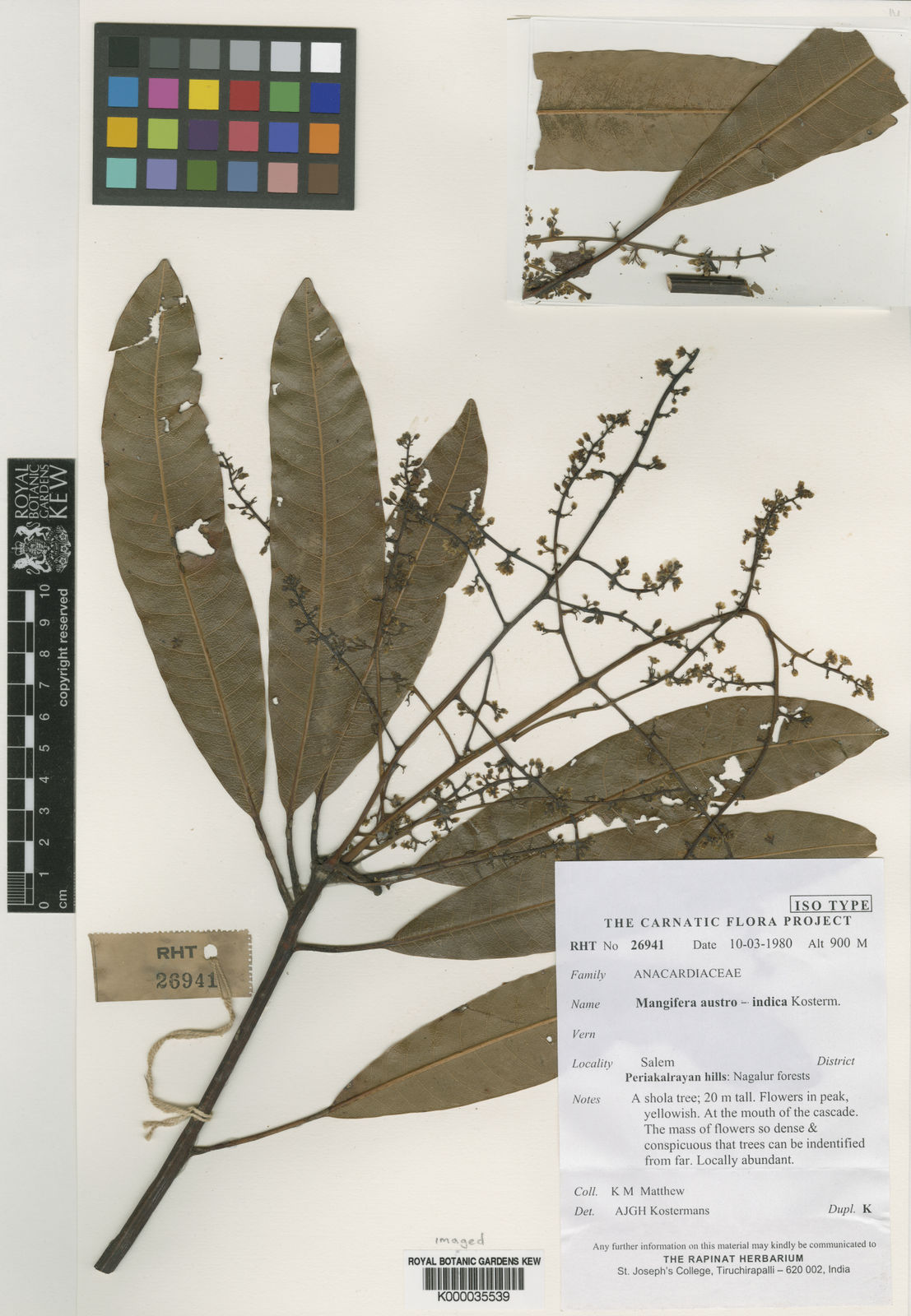

Conservation status
- Endangered (IUCN 3.1)

Scientific classification
- Kingdom: Plantae
- Clade: Embryophytes
- Clade: Tracheophytes
- Clade: Spermatophytes
- Clade: Angiosperms
- Clade: Eudicots
- Clade: Rosids
- Order: Sapindales
- Family: Anacardiaceae
- Genus: Mangifera
- Species: M. austroindica

Binomial name
- Mangifera austroindica Kosterm.

= Mangifera austroindica =

Species of flowering plant

Mangifera austroindica is a species of plant in the family Anacardiaceae. It is native to Karnataka and Tamil Nadu in India. It naturally occurs in shola forests.

== Description ==
It is a tree that grows up to 25m tall with smooth bark. Its leaves are similar to those of other Mangifera species. However, the leaves are slightly thicker then those of the main commercial mango species Mangifera indica. In comparison to that species, Mangifera austroindica's flowers are described as smaller, glabrous and the petals not reflexed and thin. It produces yellow flowers.
