= Mangifera subsessilifolia =

Conservation status
- Vulnerable (IUCN 3.1)

Scientific classification
- Kingdom: Plantae
- Clade: Tracheophytes
- Clade: Angiosperms
- Clade: Eudicots
- Clade: Rosids
- Order: Sapindales
- Family: Anacardiaceae
- Genus: Mangifera
- Species: M. subsessilifolia

Binomial name
- Mangifera subsessilifolia Kosterm.

Species of flowering plant

Mangifera subsessilifolia is a flowering plant in the family Anacardiaceae. It is native to Southeast Asia.

== Description ==
Mangifera subsessilifolia grows as a tree up to 25 m (80 ft) tall. The leathery leaves are lanceolate and measure up to 45 cm (18 in) long and up to 3 cm (1.2 in) wide.

== Taxonomy ==
Mangifera subsessilifolia was first described by Indonesian botanist André Kostermans in 1993. The type specimen was collected in Singapore. The specific epithet subsessilifolia means 'leaf nearly stalkless'.

== Distribution and habitat ==
Mangifera subsessilifolia is native to Borneo, Peninsular Malaysia and Singapore. Its habitat is in lowland dipterocarp forests.

== Conservation ==
Mangifera subsessilifolia has been assessed as vulnerable on the IUCN Red List. The species' habitat is threatened by deforestation and conversion of land for plantations.
