= Mangifera swintonioides =

Conservation status
- Vulnerable (IUCN 3.1)

Scientific classification
- Kingdom: Plantae
- Clade: Tracheophytes
- Clade: Angiosperms
- Clade: Eudicots
- Clade: Rosids
- Order: Sapindales
- Family: Anacardiaceae
- Genus: Mangifera
- Species: M. swintonioides

Binomial name
- Mangifera swintonioides Kosterm.

Species of flowering plant

Mangifera swintonioides is a flowering plant in the family Anacardiaceae. It is native to Southeast Asia.

== Description ==
Mangifera swintonioides grows as a tree up to 40 m (130 ft) tall with a trunk diameter of up to 70 cm (28 in). The grey bark is scaly and cracked. The leathery leaves are elliptic or oblong and measure up to 15 cm (6 in) long and up to 4 cm (1.6 in) wide. The inflorescences, in panicles, feature white flowers. The fruits, brown to grey, measure up to 11.5 cm (4.5 in) long.

== Taxonomy ==
Mangifera swintonioides was first described by Indonesian botanist André Kostermans in 1993. The type specimen was collected in Sabah in Borneo. The specific epithet swintonioides refers to the species' resemblance to the genus Swintonia.

== Distribution and habitat ==
Mangifera swintonioides is native to Borneo, Peninsular Malaysia and Sumatra. Its habitat is in lowland forests, including in peat swamps.

== Conservation ==
Mangifera swintonioides has been assessed as vulnerable on the IUCN Red List. The species' habitat is threatened by deforestation and conversion of land for plantations. The species is some protected areas including Taman Negara National Park in Peninsular Malaysia, and in some forest reserves.
