= Mangifera campnospermoides =

Conservation status
- Critically Endangered (IUCN 2.3)

Scientific classification
- Kingdom: Plantae
- Clade: Tracheophytes
- Clade: Angiosperms
- Clade: Eudicots
- Clade: Rosids
- Order: Sapindales
- Family: Anacardiaceae
- Genus: Mangifera
- Species: M. campnospermoides

Binomial name
- Mangifera campnospermoides Kosterm.

Species of plant

Mangifera campnospermoides is a species of plant in the family Anacardiaceae. It is a tree endemic to Kalimantan in Indonesia. It is a critically endangered species threatened by habitat loss.
