= Mangifera transversalis =

Conservation status
- Vulnerable (IUCN 2.3)

Scientific classification
- Kingdom: Plantae
- Clade: Tracheophytes
- Clade: Angiosperms
- Clade: Eudicots
- Clade: Rosids
- Order: Sapindales
- Family: Anacardiaceae
- Genus: Mangifera
- Species: M. transversalis

Binomial name
- Mangifera transversalis Kosterm.

Species of tree

Mangifera transversalis is a species of plant in the family Anacardiaceae. It is a tree endemic to the Maluku Islands in Indonesia.
