= Mangifera rufocostata =

Conservation status
- Vulnerable (IUCN 2.3)

Scientific classification
- Kingdom: Plantae
- Clade: Tracheophytes
- Clade: Angiosperms
- Clade: Eudicots
- Clade: Rosids
- Order: Sapindales
- Family: Anacardiaceae
- Genus: Mangifera
- Species: M. rufocostata

Binomial name
- Mangifera rufocostata Kosterm.

Species of tree

Mangifera rufocostata (locally called asem kiat) is a species of plant in the family Anacardiaceae. It is a tree found in Sumatra, Peninsular Malaysia and Borneo.
