= Mangifera collina =

Conservation status
- Endangered (IUCN 3.1)

Scientific classification
- Kingdom: Plantae
- Clade: Tracheophytes
- Clade: Angiosperms
- Clade: Eudicots
- Clade: Rosids
- Order: Sapindales
- Family: Anacardiaceae
- Genus: Mangifera
- Species: M. collina

Binomial name
- Mangifera collina Kosterm.

Species of tree

Mangifera collina is a species of plant in the family Anacardiaceae. It is endemic to an area near Chiang Mai, Thailand.
