= Mangifera torquenda =

Scientific classification
- Kingdom: Plantae
- Clade: Embryophytes
- Clade: Tracheophytes
- Clade: Spermatophytes
- Clade: Angiosperms
- Clade: Eudicots
- Clade: Rosids
- Order: Sapindales
- Family: Anacardiaceae
- Genus: Mangifera
- Species: M. torquenda

Binomial name
- Mangifera torquenda Kosterm.

Species of flowering plant

Mangifera torquenda is a species of flowering plant, a fruit tree in the mango family, that is native to Southeast Asia.

== Name ==
The specific epithet torquenda (‘which is to be twisted’) refers to the method of opening the fruits by cutting around the outer skin and then twisting them. Local names include lamantan, kemantan and buniton.

== Description ==
The tree grows to 40 m in height with a 10 m bole and a dark green, rounded crown. The oval leaves are smooth, 17–21 cm long by 6–9 cm wide. The inflorescences occur as 25 cm pseudo-terminal panicles of fragrant, white to pale yellow flowers. The fruits are round to ovoid drupes 7.5–10 cm long by 6.5–8.5 cm wide, greenish-yellow when ripe, with brown spots and patches. The flesh is pale yellow and edible. The seed has a smooth white endocarp.

== Distribution and habitat ==
The species occurs in the Malay Peninsula, Sumatra and Borneo, where it is found in lowland and hill mixed dipterocarp forest up to an elevation of 800 m.

== Usage ==
The species is cultivated around villages in East Kalimantan; elsewhere the fruits are generally collected from forest trees. The sour flesh is used in sambals and in cooking fish, and the juice used in cordials.
