= Mangifera nicobarica =

Conservation status
- Endangered (IUCN 2.3)

Scientific classification
- Kingdom: Plantae
- Clade: Tracheophytes
- Clade: Angiosperms
- Clade: Eudicots
- Clade: Rosids
- Order: Sapindales
- Family: Anacardiaceae
- Genus: Mangifera
- Species: M. nicobarica

Binomial name
- Mangifera nicobarica Kosterm.

Species of flowering plant

Mangifera nicobarica is a species of plant in the family Anacardiaceae. It is endemic to the Nicobar Islands.
