= Mangifera applanata =

Conservation status
- Near Threatened (IUCN 3.1)

Scientific classification
- Kingdom: Plantae
- Clade: Tracheophytes
- Clade: Angiosperms
- Clade: Eudicots
- Clade: Rosids
- Order: Sapindales
- Family: Anacardiaceae
- Genus: Mangifera
- Species: M. applanata

Binomial name
- Mangifera applanata Kosterm.
- Mangifera applanata distribution

Species of flowering plant

Mangifera applanata is a species of fruit bearing tree that is part of the family Anacardiaceae.

== Description ==
The tree can grow up to a height of 40 m (130 ft). The trunk of the tree can be free of branches for the first 20 m (66 ft) from the ground and its bark is thinly fissured. It produces small, yellow flowers and it produces a creamy sap when injured. The entire tree is glabrous. Its branches are smooth and thin, the texture of its leaves have been described as mostly chartaceous and somewhat coriaceous and its leaves are long and taper to a sharp tip. The tree produces a greenish yellow, tart fruit with a large, tough seed that makes up the bulk of the fruit's weight. Its fruit is shaped similarly to other Mangifera species such as Mangifera indica, however, it is described as more flattened and smaller. The seed itself is always monoembryonic.

== Distribution and habitat ==
The species is native to Borneo, Sumatra and the Peninsular Malaysia. It is typically found within tropical rainforest. Like other mango species, they occur as spread out individuals, or sometimes as clusters of roughly a dozen trees.
