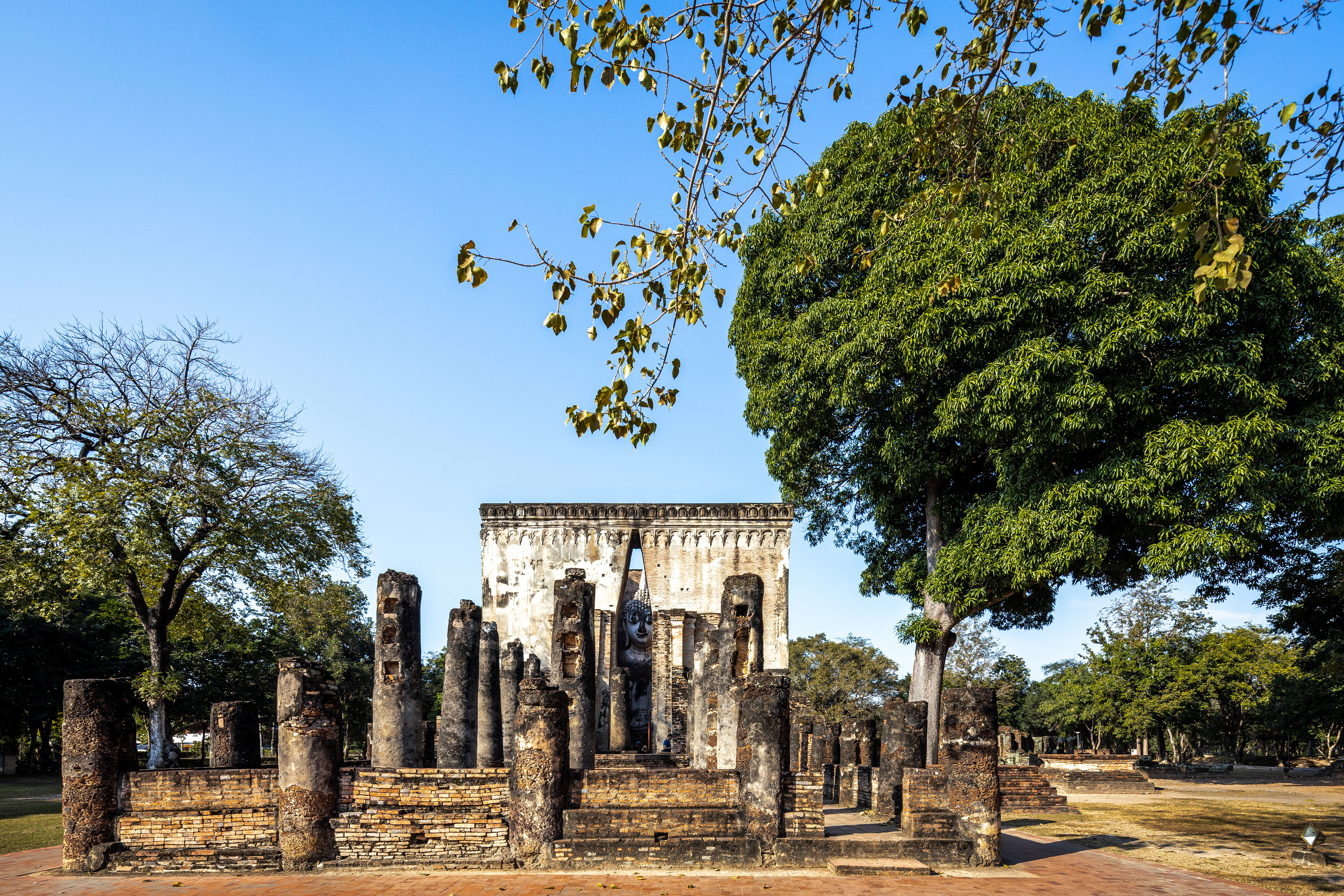

Conservation status
- Data Deficient (IUCN 3.1)

Scientific classification
- Kingdom: Plantae
- Clade: Tracheophytes
- Clade: Angiosperms
- Clade: Eudicots
- Clade: Rosids
- Order: Sapindales
- Family: Anacardiaceae
- Genus: Mangifera
- Species: M. pentandra

Binomial name
- Mangifera pentandra Hook.f.

= Mangifera pentandra =

Species of tree

Mangifera pentandra is a species of plant in the family Anacardiaceae. It is found in Malaysia, Singapore, and possibly Thailand.
