= Diospyros pilosanthera =

Scientific classification
- Kingdom: Plantae
- Clade: Embryophytes
- Clade: Tracheophytes
- Clade: Spermatophytes
- Clade: Angiosperms
- Clade: Eudicots
- Clade: Asterids
- Order: Ericales
- Family: Ebenaceae
- Genus: Diospyros
- Species: D. pilosanthera

Binomial name
- Diospyros pilosanthera Blanco

Synonyms
- List: Diospyros carthei Hiern; Diospyros cubica Bakh.; Diospyros elmeri Merr.; Diospyros helferi C.B.Clarke; Diospyros hiernii Koord.; Diospyros moonii Hiern; Diospyros nidus-avis Kosterm.; Diospyros plicata Merr.; Diospyros polyalthioides Hiern; Diospyros rubescens Koord. & Valeton; Diospyros tayabensis Merr.

Species of tree

Diospyros pilosanthera is a tree in the family Ebenaceae. It grows up to 35 metres (110 ft) tall. The twigs are slender to stout. Inflorescences bear up to 12 flowers. The fruits are round to ovoid, up to 3.5 cm (1 in) in diameter. The specific epithet pilosanthera is from the Latin meaning 'with pilose or hairy anthers'. Habitat is forests from sea level to 1,600 metres (5,200 ft) altitude. D. pilosanthera is found from Indochina to Malesia.
