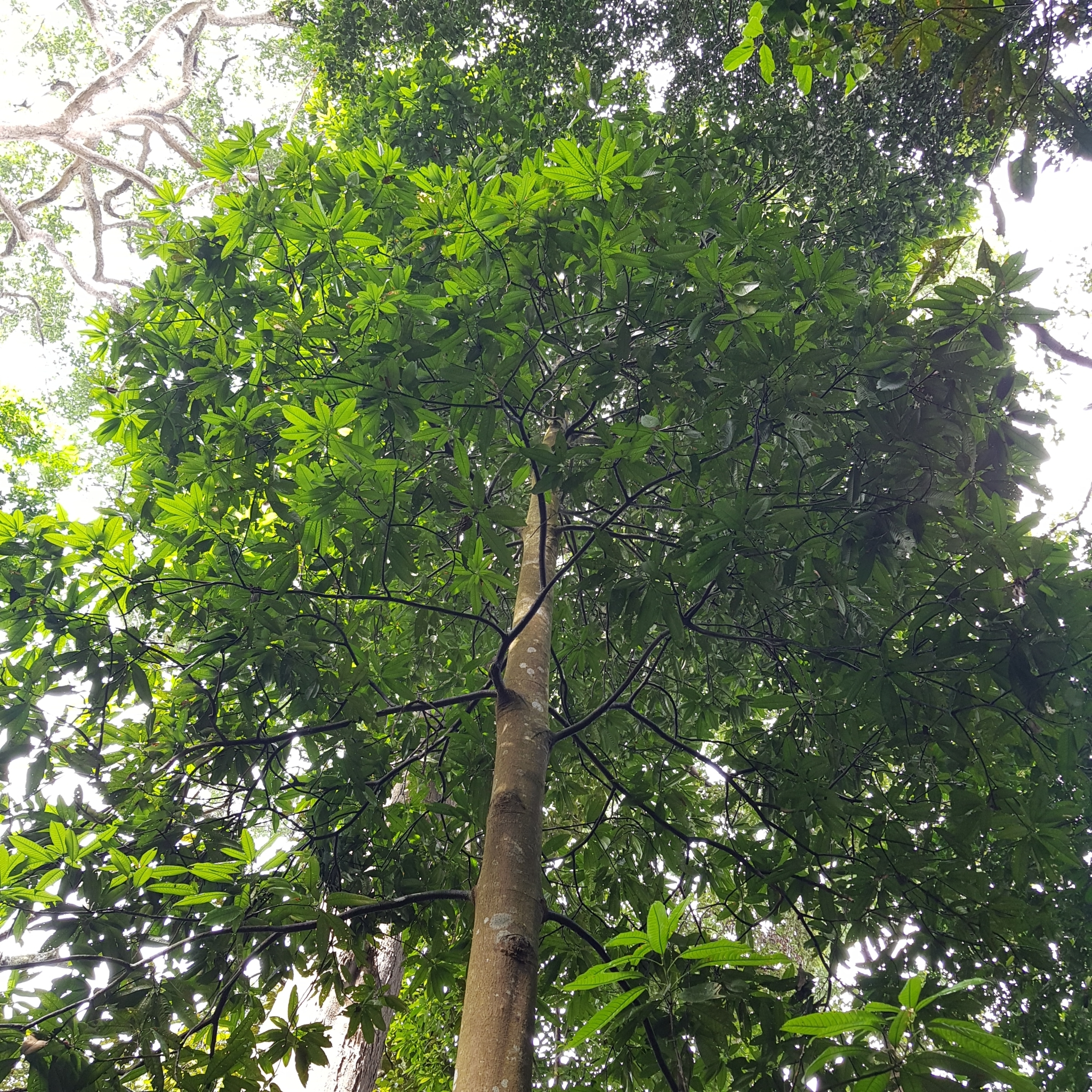

Conservation status
- Least Concern (IUCN 3.1)

Scientific classification
- Kingdom: Plantae
- Clade: Tracheophytes
- Clade: Angiosperms
- Clade: Eudicots
- Clade: Rosids
- Order: Sapindales
- Family: Anacardiaceae
- Genus: Mangifera
- Species: M. quadrifida

Binomial name
- Mangifera quadrifida Jack

Synonyms
- Mangifera langong Miq.; Mangifera longipetiolata King; Mangifera maingayi Hook.f.; Mangifera quadrifida var. longipetiolata (King) Kochummen; Mangifera quadrifida var. spathulifolia (Blume) Engl.; Mangifera rigida Blume; Mangifera spathulifolia Blume

= Mangifera quadrifida =

Species of tree

Mangifera quadrifida is a species of plant in the family Anacardiaceae. It is a tree native to Peninsular Malaysia, Sumatra and Borneo.
