= Mangifera persiciforma =

Conservation status
- Data Deficient (IUCN 2.3)

Scientific classification
- Kingdom: Plantae
- Clade: Embryophytes
- Clade: Tracheophytes
- Clade: Spermatophytes
- Clade: Angiosperms
- Clade: Eudicots
- Clade: Rosids
- Order: Sapindales
- Family: Anacardiaceae
- Genus: Mangifera
- Species: M. persiciforma

Binomial name
- Mangifera persiciforma C.Y.Wu & T.L.Ming

Species of flowering plant

Mangifera persiciforma is a species of plant in the family Anacardiaceae. It is endemic to southwestern China, where it is found in Funing County, Yunnan; southwestern Guizhou; and southern Guangxi.
