= Mangifera monandra =

Conservation status
- Near Threatened (IUCN 3.1)

Scientific classification
- Kingdom: Plantae
- Clade: Tracheophytes
- Clade: Angiosperms
- Clade: Eudicots
- Clade: Rosids
- Order: Sapindales
- Family: Anacardiaceae
- Genus: Mangifera
- Species: M. monandra

Binomial name
- Mangifera monandra Merr.

Species of flowering plant

Mangifera monandra is a species of plant in the family Anacardiaceae. It is endemic to the Philippines. It is threatened by habitat loss.
