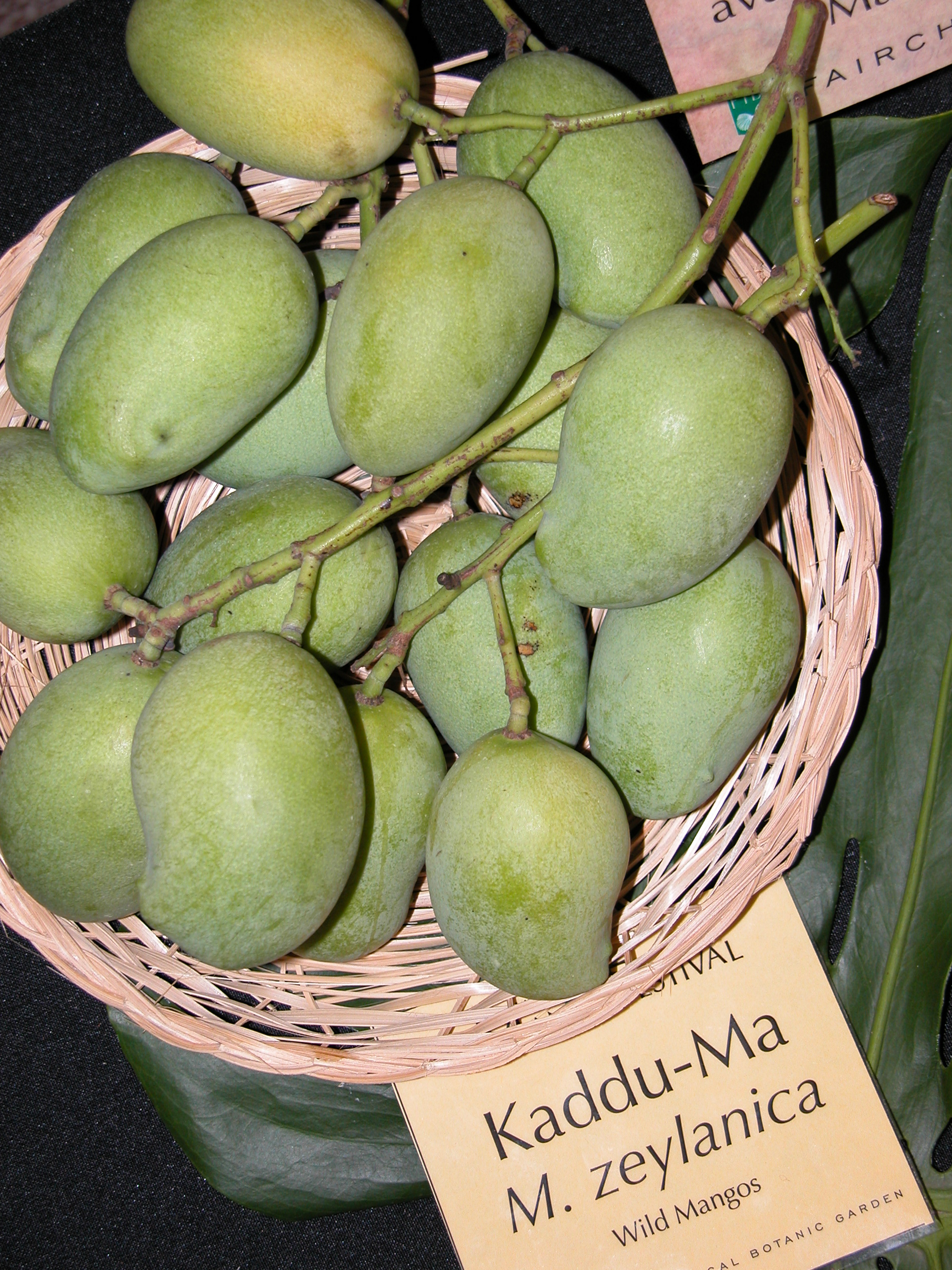

Conservation status
- Vulnerable (IUCN 2.3)

Scientific classification
- Kingdom: Plantae
- Clade: Embryophytes
- Clade: Tracheophytes
- Clade: Angiosperms
- Clade: Eudicots
- Clade: Rosids
- Order: Sapindales
- Family: Anacardiaceae
- Genus: Mangifera
- Species: M. zeylanica

Binomial name
- Mangifera zeylanica (Blume) Hook.f.

Synonyms
- Buchanania zeylanica Blume

= Mangifera zeylanica =

Species of flowering plant

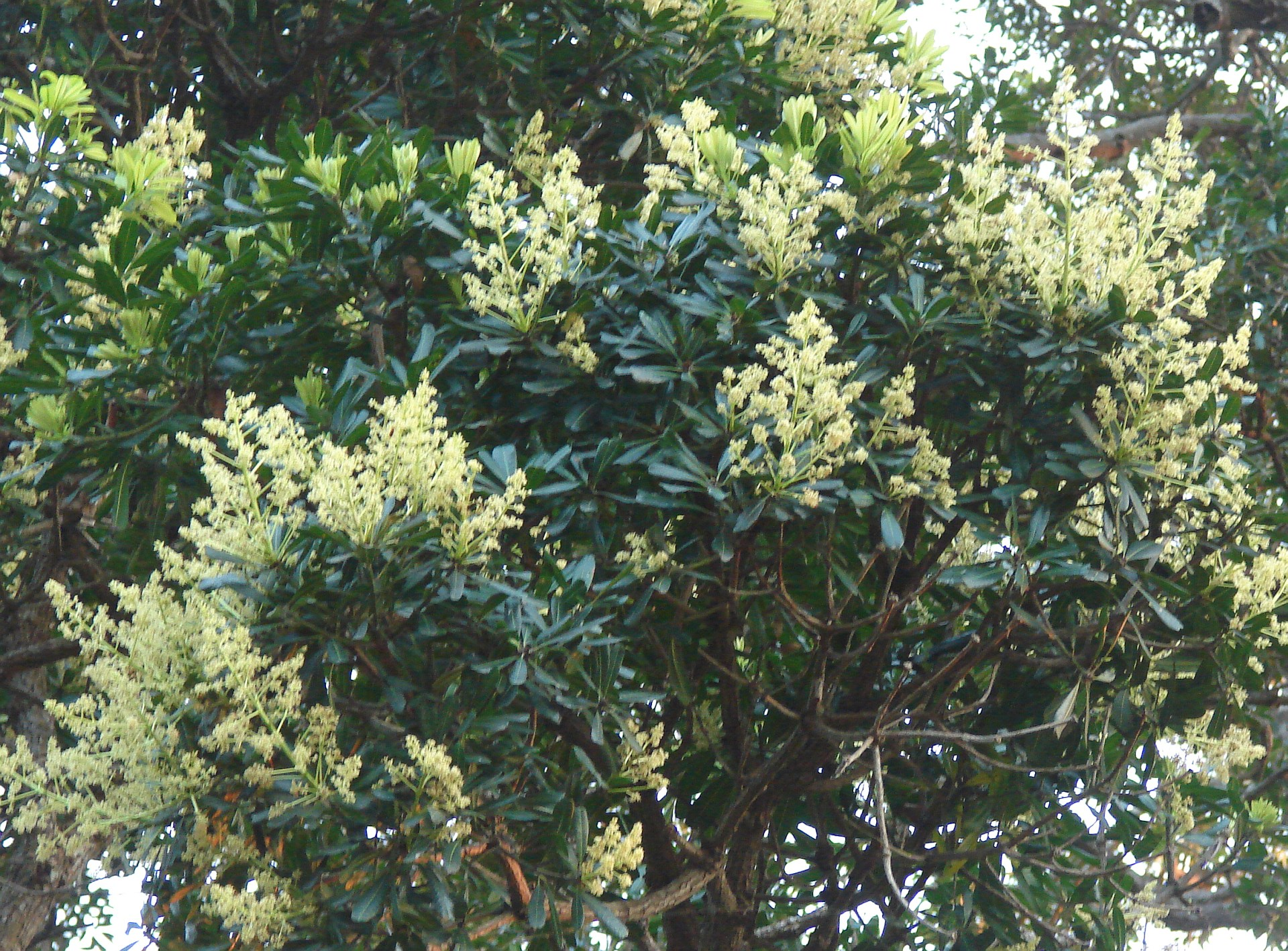
Flowering Mangifera zeylanica tree in Kurunegala

Mangifera zeylanica, or Sri Lanka wild mango, is a wild species of mango relative endemic to Sri Lanka. This stately tree is the tallest member of the mango genus, Mangifera, and one of the two tallest trees in the family Anacardiaceae. The mango fruits are edible and have an excellent taste. It is called aetamba (ඇටඹ) or wal amba in Sinhala and kaddu-ma in Tamil.

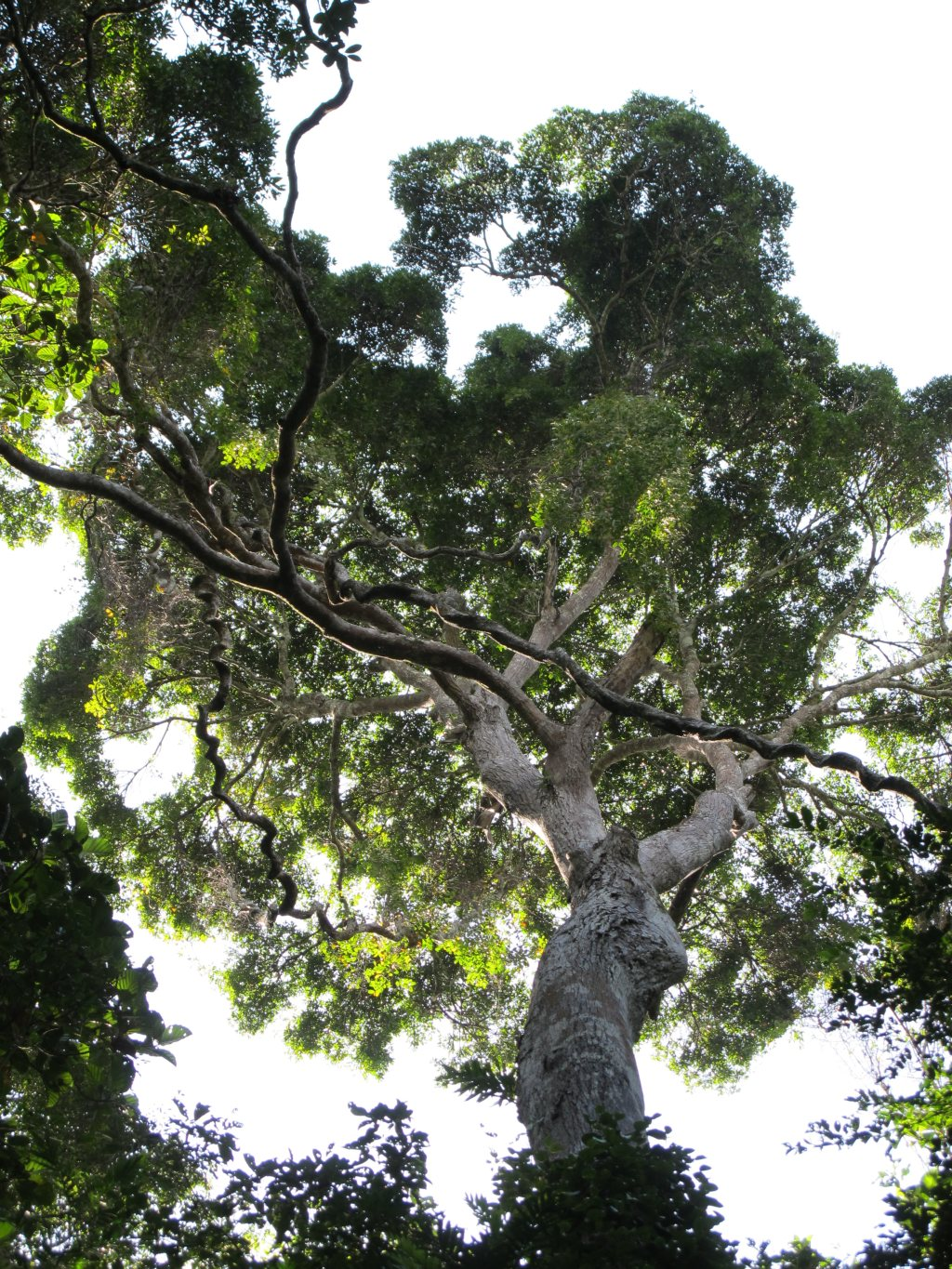
Large tree in Udawattakele Forest

The species was first described as Buchanania zeylanica by Carl Ludwig Blume in 1850. In 1876 the British botanist and explorer Joseph Dalton Hooker placed the species in genus Mangifera as M. zeylanica.

== Description ==
Mangifera zeylanica is a large, slow growing, evergreen tree that can grow up to 35 m (115 ft) tall.

The trunk is straight, up to 90 cm (35 in) in diameter, and is free of buttresses. Bark in older trees is rough, deeply fissured, with strips 2–3 cm (0.79–1.18 in) wide, and dark to light brown. The inner bark is orange brown. The wood is greyish white, soft, and coarsely grained.

The dark green leaves are stiffly coriaceous, glabrous, and emit a mango aroma when damaged. The leaves are scattered, partly aggregating at the end of twigs. In shape they are spathulate or obovate-oblong or oblanceolate, up to 5 cm (2.0 in) wide and 16 cm (6.3 in) long, tapering towards the base, with a rounded apex in adult trees and with a pointed 7–13 cm (2.8–5.1 in) apex in saplings. The margins are slightly incurved and narrowly decurrent at the base along the petiole. The midrib is raised on both leaf surfaces. Lateral nerves 7 to 14 pairs. Petiole slender, 1–3 cm (0.39–1.18 in) long.

Panicles glabrous, erect, up to 20 cm (7.9 in) long, terminal. Flowers whitish and cream yellow coloured, 5–merous, 4 mm (0.16 in) across, not glomerulate. Bracteoles lanceolate, minute, caducous. Pedicel slender, 1 mm (0.04 in). Petals twice as long as sepals. Sepals 5, ovate, acute, 2 mm × 1.5 mm (0.08 in × 0.06 in). Petals 5, elliptic, 3.5 x 2 mm. Disc large, cushion-like, with 5 globose lobes. 1 fertile stamen (rarely 2), 2 mm (0.08 in) long.

The ripe fruit is yellowish in colour and with a red flush. It has the shape of a mango, ovoid, slightly flattened, with a small beak, up to 6.5 cm × 5 cm × 4 cm (2.6 in × 2.0 in × 1.6 in), and a thin skin. When ripe, which is when it falls of the tree, it is very juicy and fluid with soft, thin, fibres. The yellow pulp has a pleasant sweet taste, but is slightly acid when unripe. Hard endocarp with longitudinal veins, 5 x 2.5 by 3 x 12 cm.

== Distribution ==
It mainly grows in forests of the intermediate and wet zones up to 800 m (2,600 ft), but can also be found in the Dry Zone along waterways and in moist valley areas. It occurs at low population densities, scattered here and there in forests, and, like many native plants, is declining in unprotected areas.

== Uses ==
The fruit is eaten by villagers. The soft wood has been used for making tea cases and the like. The tree is not cultivated, but could be used for crossing and improving mango varieties and as a rootstock.
