= Kuini =

Kuini may refer to:

- Mangifera odorata, a species of plant with edible fruit similar to the related mango
- the Queen of the Kīngitanga Māori movement, in New Zealand
- Yeidji, an Aboriginal Australian people (also known as Kwini or Gwini).
