= Eomangiferophyllum =

Scientific classification
- Kingdom: Plantae
- Clade: Tracheophytes
- Clade: Angiosperms
- Clade: Eudicots
- Clade: Rosids
- Order: Sapindales
- Family: Anacardiaceae
- Subfamily: Anacardioideae
- Genus: †Eomangiferophyllum; R.C. Mehrotra, Dilcher, N. Awasthi
- Species: †E. damalgiriense

Binomial name
- †Eomangiferophyllum damalgiriense R.C. Mehrotra, Dilcher, N. Awasthi

Extinct species of flowering plant

Eomangiferophyllum damalgiriense is an extinct species of fruit bearing tree. It is believed to be the direct ancestor of the genus Mangifera, which includes the mango, Mangifera indica, one of the world's most cultivated fruit crops. Its genus, Eomangiferophyllum, is monotypic.

== Paleobiogeography ==
The species first appeared during the Upper Paleocene in northeastern India, roughly 60 million years ago. It is unclear exactly where and when Eomangiferophyllum damalgiriense diverged to form the genus Mangifera. However, carbonized leaf fossils of the species support the hypothesis that Mangifera first evolved in the Peninsular India, and then spread throughout what is modern-day Southeast Asia via land bridges formed between the Indian and Asian continental plates during the late Eocene.

== Description ==
The leaves of this species are similar to those of Mangifera, with minor differences in the shape, size and vein characteristics of the leaves. Due to a lack of fossil evidence, there is no known information regarding the fruit, branches or wood of this species.
