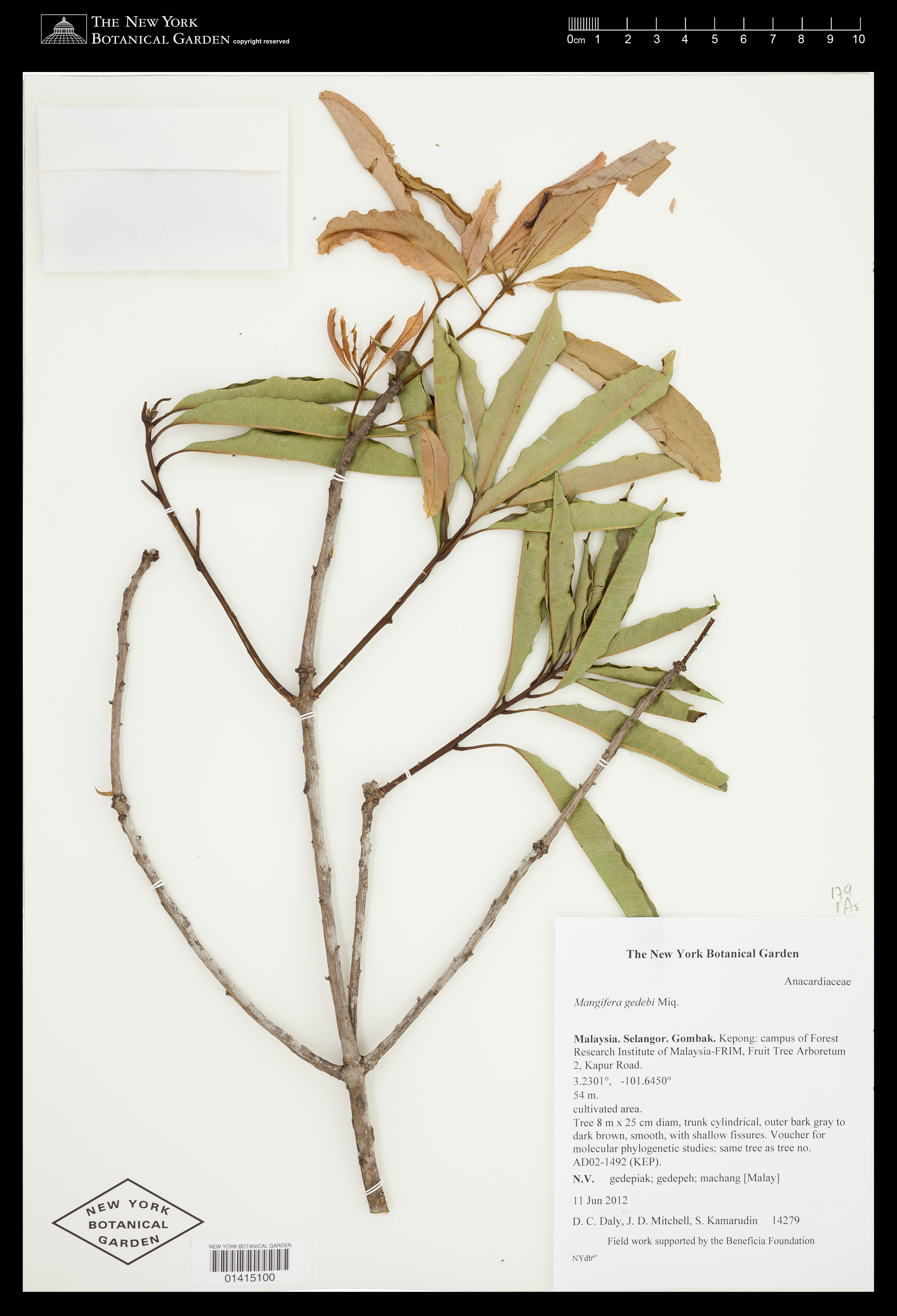

Conservation status
- Near Threatened (IUCN 3.1)

Scientific classification
- Kingdom: Plantae
- Clade: Embryophytes
- Clade: Tracheophytes
- Clade: Spermatophytes
- Clade: Angiosperms
- Clade: Eudicots
- Clade: Rosids
- Order: Sapindales
- Family: Anacardiaceae
- Genus: Mangifera
- Species: M. gedebe

Binomial name
- Mangifera gedebe Miq.

Synonyms
- Mangifera gedebi Miq.

= Mangifera gedebe =

Species of flowering plant

Mangifera gedebe is a species of plant in the family Anacardiaceae. In Javanese it is known as kedepir, in Malay repeh, in Sumatra it has been called gedepir, and in Kalimantan asam rambang or kepi.

== Description ==
It is a tree, and can grow up to 30 metres tall and up to 60 centimetres diameter, though it usually grows to about 15 metres tall and 45 centimetres diameter at breast height. The elliptic to oblong-shaped leaves are somewhat leathery in texture and 5 to 23 cm in length and 2 to 6 cm in width. The flowers are white, and have five stamens, of which only one is fertile. It produces obliquely subrotund drupes as fruit, these are 8 to 9 cm in diameter and have a thin layer of fibrous flesh. The seeds, like a walnut, have a very irregularly lobed and folded surface.

== Distribution and habitat ==
It grows in lowlands on river banks or in swamp forests. The flowers appear from June to September, the fruits from August to November.

== Conservation ==
A 1991 book, based on information from 1985, states that the species is rare and urgently requires conservation in eastern Borneo; in 2014, the species's conservation status on the IUCN Red List of Threatened Species was assessed as 'near threatened'.

== Uses ==
It is sometimes grown locally for the fruit. The drupes are very sour, and they are only edible when unripe, as when ripe the pulp is too scanty and hard.
