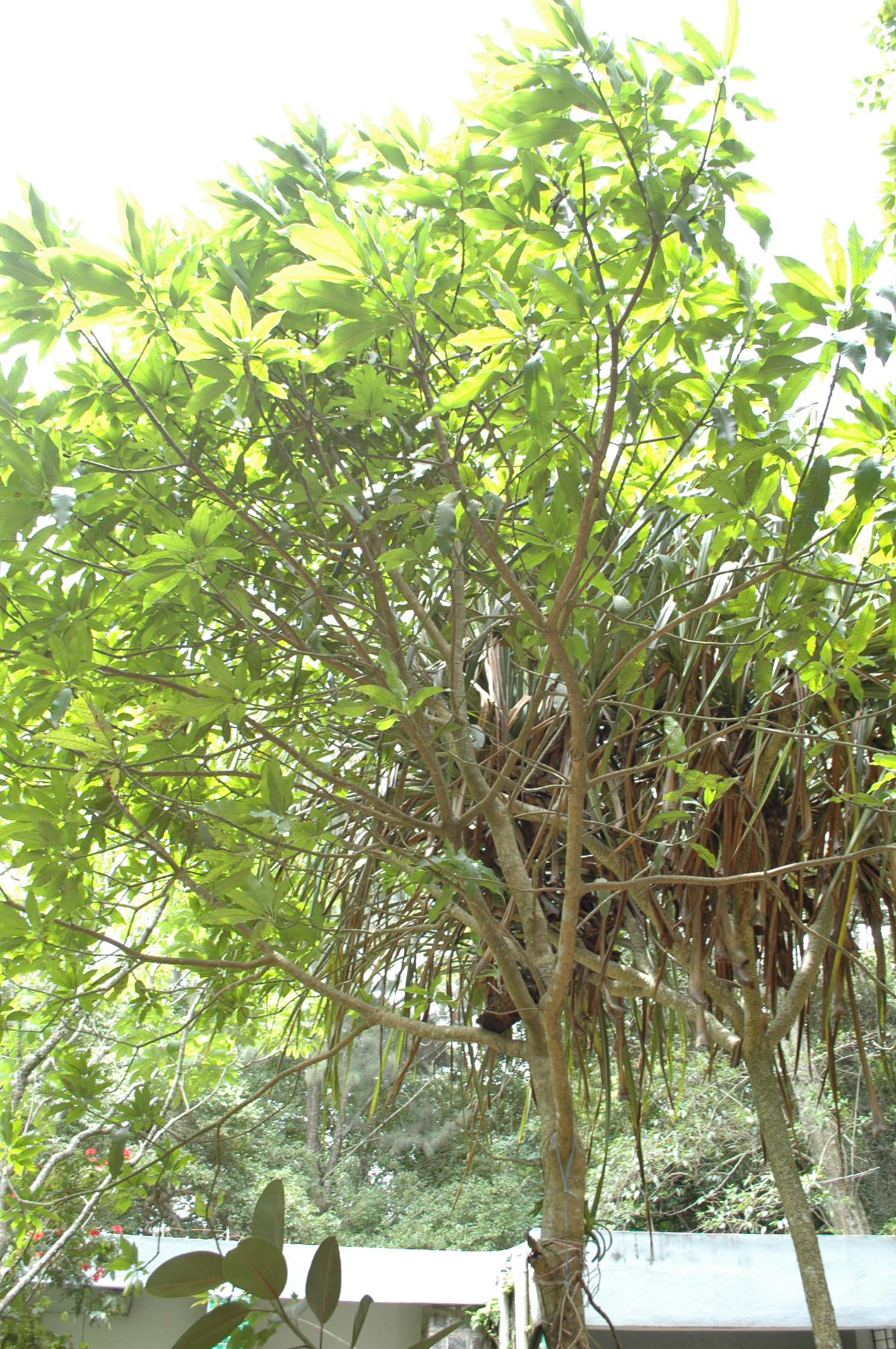

Conservation status
- Near Threatened (IUCN 3.1)

Scientific classification
- Kingdom: Plantae
- Clade: Embryophytes
- Clade: Tracheophytes
- Clade: Spermatophytes
- Clade: Angiosperms
- Clade: Eudicots
- Clade: Rosids
- Order: Sapindales
- Family: Anacardiaceae
- Genus: Mangifera
- Species: M. andamanica

Binomial name
- Mangifera andamanica King

= Mangifera andamanica =

Species of flowering plant

Mangifera andamanica is a species of flowering plant in the family Anacardiaceae. It is endemic to the Andaman Islands in the Bay of Bengal. The fruits are edible and smaller than the Common Mango. This species is conserved at the Field Gene bank of Jawaharlal Neheru Tropical Botanic Garden and research Institute, Thiruvananthapuram, India.
