= Mangifera griffithii =

Scientific classification
- Kingdom: Plantae
- Clade: Embryophytes
- Clade: Tracheophytes
- Clade: Spermatophytes
- Clade: Angiosperms
- Clade: Eudicots
- Clade: Rosids
- Order: Sapindales
- Family: Anacardiaceae
- Genus: Mangifera
- Species: M. griffithii

Binomial name
- Mangifera griffithii Hook.f.

Species of flowering plant

Mangifera griffithii is a species of flowering plant, a fruit tree in the mango family, that is native to Southeast Asia.

== Description ==
The tree grows to 30–40 m in height with a 20 m bole. The oval leaves are smooth and leathery, 5–18 cm long by 3–7 cm wide. The inflorescences occur as 10–25 cm axillary or terminal panicles of small whitish flowers. The fruits are round to ovoid drupes 2.5–3.5 cm long by 1.5–2.5 cm wide, yellowish to pink or rose-red, sometimes becoming purplish-black when ripe. The flesh is orange-yellow and edible. The seed has a leathery fibrous endocarp.

== Distribution and habitat ==
The species occurs in the Malay Peninsula, Sumatra and Borneo, where it is found in lowland mixed dipterocarp and swamp forest up to an elevation of 400 m. It is often cultivated.
