= Mangifera gracilipes =

Conservation status
- Least Concern (IUCN 2.3)

Scientific classification
- Kingdom: Plantae
- Clade: Tracheophytes
- Clade: Angiosperms
- Clade: Eudicots
- Clade: Rosids
- Order: Sapindales
- Family: Anacardiaceae
- Genus: Mangifera
- Species: M. gracilipes

Binomial name
- Mangifera gracilipes Hook.f.

Species of tree

Mangifera gracilipes is a species of plant in the family Anacardiaceae. It is found in Indonesia and Malaysia.
