= Mangifera magnifica =

Conservation status
- Near Threatened (IUCN 3.1)

Scientific classification
- Kingdom: Plantae
- Clade: Embryophytes
- Clade: Tracheophytes
- Clade: Angiosperms
- Clade: Eudicots
- Clade: Rosids
- Order: Sapindales
- Family: Anacardiaceae
- Genus: Mangifera
- Species: M. magnifica

Binomial name
- Mangifera magnifica Kochummen

Species of tree

Mangifera magnifica is a species of tree in the family Anacardiaceae. Its common name is Machang Pulasan.

Trees can grow up to 20 to 40 meters in height, with a trunk that is about 1.3 meters across. The species also has a self supporting growth. Its sexual system is andromonoecy.

It is common species in the rainforests of western parts of Malesia. It is found in Sumatra, Borneo, and Peninsular Malaysia.

The plant is of importance to the myths of the Land Dayak peoples.
