= Mangifera parvifolia =

Conservation status
- Least Concern (IUCN 2.3)

Scientific classification
- Kingdom: Plantae
- Clade: Embryophytes
- Clade: Tracheophytes
- Clade: Angiosperms
- Clade: Eudicots
- Clade: Rosids
- Order: Sapindales
- Family: Anacardiaceae
- Genus: Mangifera
- Species: M. parvifolia

Binomial name
- Mangifera parvifolia Boerl. & Koord.-Schum.

Species of flowering plant

Mangifera parvifolia is a species of plant in the family Anacardiaceae. It is a tree found in Indonesia, Malaysia, and Singapore.
