= Mangifera decandra =

Scientific classification
- Kingdom: Plantae
- Clade: Tracheophytes
- Clade: Angiosperms
- Clade: Eudicots
- Clade: Rosids
- Order: Sapindales
- Family: Anacardiaceae
- Genus: Mangifera
- Species: M. decandra

Binomial name
- Mangifera decandra Ding Hou, 1972

Species of tree

Mangifera decandra is a species of mango trees in the genus Mangifera (family Anacardiaceae). It was described by Ding Hou in 1972.

== Etymology ==
The specific name "decandra" means "with ten stamens" in Latin.

== Description ==
Mangifera decandra trees stand up to 39 metres in height, with a diameter of 75 cm dbh. The mangoes are 10 centimetres long, with green-reddish-brown skin and whitish flesh. They have a sweet-sour flavour. The flowers are pinkish-red in colour, are 4 millimetres in diameter, and occur in panicles. The leaves occur in whorls and lack stipules.

== Distribution and ecology ==
Mangifera decandra is known from Sumatra and Borneo, where it occurs in undisturbed lowland forests made up predominantly of dipterocarp trees. Domestically, it is planted as a fruit tree in forest gardens. The trees can survive at a maximum altitude of 800 metres, although they typically dwell much lower.
