= Mangifera camptosperma =

Scientific classification
- Kingdom: Plantae
- Clade: Embryophytes
- Clade: Tracheophytes
- Clade: Angiosperms
- Clade: Eudicots
- Clade: Rosids
- Order: Sapindales
- Family: Anacardiaceae
- Genus: Mangifera
- Species: M. camptosperma

Binomial name
- Mangifera camptosperma Pierre

Species of flowering plant

Mangifera camptosperma is a species of tree closely related to the mango, and native to the Andaman and Nicobar Islands, Cambodia, Laos, Thailand, and Vietnam. It grows primarily in wet, tropical environments. M. camptosperma most notably has a flat shape, unlike other species in Mangifera. It has simple, glabrous leaves with hair-like structures when broken open.
