= Mangifera caloneura =

Conservation status
- Least Concern (IUCN 3.1)

Scientific classification
- Kingdom: Plantae
- Clade: Tracheophytes
- Clade: Angiosperms
- Clade: Eudicots
- Clade: Rosids
- Order: Sapindales
- Family: Anacardiaceae
- Genus: Mangifera
- Species: M. caloneura

Binomial name
- Mangifera caloneura Kurz
- Mangifera caloneura distribution

Species of flowering plant

Mangifera caloneura (also known as poh in Javanese or Ma muang paa in Thai) is a fruit bearing tree in the family Anacardiaceae. It is native to Mainland Southeast Asia.

== Description ==
The tree has been observed growing up to 40 meters (130 ft) tall, however, a height of roughly 20 meters (66 ft) is much more common. It excretes a resin upon injury that sets into a black colour. The diameter of the tree's trunk varies but is typically around 60 centimetres (24 in), although it has been seen at sizes of over 1.2 metres (3 ft 11 in). It has fissured bark of a colour that varies between black, grey and brown.

Its leaves are glabrous and take on an oblong to lanceolate-oblong shape. Like other Mangifera species, their texture has been described as chartaceous to subcoriaceous. The petioles are typically 2 to 7 centimetres (0.79 to 2.76 in) long. Leaf sizes vary, roughly, between a width of 3 centimetres (1.2 in) and 9 centimetres (3.5 in), as well as a length of 10 centimetres (3.9 in) to 22 centimetres (8.7 in).

The fruit are small compared to other species in the genus, such as Mangifera indica, however, they are similarly shaped. The fruit are 3 to 5 centimetres (1.2 to 2.0 in) in size and the seed's endosperm is ruminate. When ripe, the fruit has greenish-yellow to orange skin and the flesh is white. When fully developed, the fruit are roughly 40 grams (1.4 oz).

Its flowers are small, typically measuring around 0.6 to 0.8 centimetres (0.24 to 0.31 in). There are 5 stamens on each flower. The flowers have 4 to 5 petals, each is typically 0.5 centimetres (0.20 in) long. The petals are white with a longitudinal yellow colouration. The flowers' stalks are very short.

== Distribution and habitat ==
The species is native to Mainland Southeast Asia. Specifically, it is native to Thailand, Cambodia, Laos, Vietnam and Myanmar. It occurs within monsoonal deciduous forests, savannas (Note: Individuals in this biome tend to grow much shorter) and lowland tropical rainforests

== Uses ==
The young leaves of the tree can be eaten uncooked, they have been described as sour tasting. The fruit itself is also eaten, the taste has been described as sweetly acidic.

There has been research into potential pharmacological applications of the leaf extract of Mangifera caloneura due to its antioxidant and antidiabetic properties. A 2015 study was conducted on rats that had been artificially induced with diabetes following a controlled application of streptozotocin. These rats were then given a dosage of the leaf extract at a concentration of 250 mg/kg for 6 weeks. When comparing with the control it was shown that the blood-glucose levels of the rats had significantly decreased to the point where the leaf extract may be viable as a potential diabetes medication.
