= Mangifera minutifolia =

Conservation status
- Endangered (IUCN 3.1)

Scientific classification
- Kingdom: Plantae
- Clade: Tracheophytes
- Clade: Angiosperms
- Clade: Eudicots
- Clade: Rosids
- Order: Sapindales
- Family: Anacardiaceae
- Genus: Mangifera
- Species: M. minutifolia

Binomial name
- Mangifera minutifolia Evrard

Species of tree

Mangifera minutifolia is a species of plant in the family Anacardiaceae. It is endemic to Vietnam.
