= Mangifera flava =

Conservation status
- Vulnerable (IUCN 3.1)

Scientific classification
- Kingdom: Plantae
- Clade: Tracheophytes
- Clade: Angiosperms
- Clade: Eudicots
- Clade: Rosids
- Order: Sapindales
- Family: Anacardiaceae
- Genus: Mangifera
- Species: M. flava

Binomial name
- Mangifera flava Evrard

Species of plant

Mangifera flava is a species of plant in the family Anacardiaceae. It is found in wetlands of Cambodia and Vietnam.
