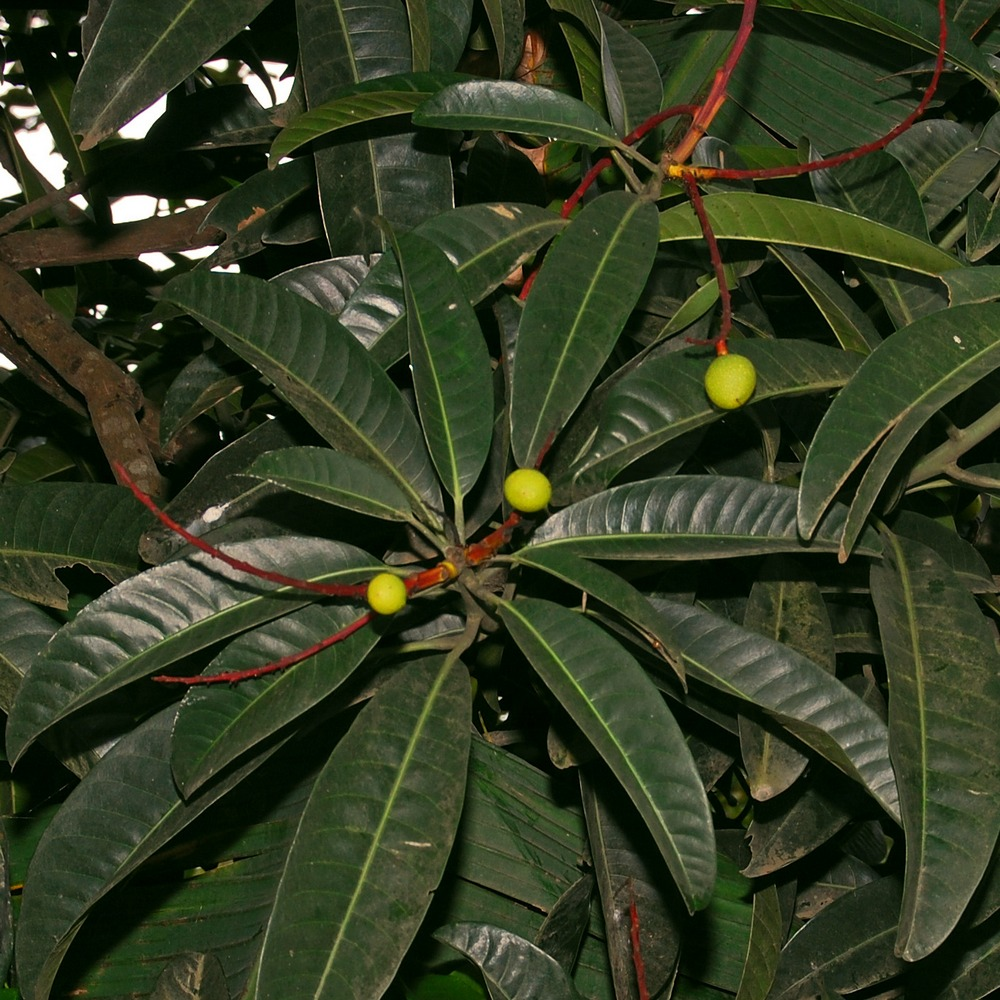

Conservation status
- Least Concern (IUCN 3.1)

Scientific classification
- Kingdom: Plantae
- Clade: Embryophytes
- Clade: Tracheophytes
- Clade: Angiosperms
- Clade: Eudicots
- Clade: Rosids
- Order: Sapindales
- Family: Anacardiaceae
- Genus: Mangifera
- Species: M. foetida

Binomial name
- Mangifera foetida Lour.

Synonyms
- Mangifera foetida var. cochinchinensis Pierre; Mangifera foetida var. leschenaultii (Marchand) Engl.; Mangifera foetida var. sphaeroidea Blume; Mangifera horsfieldii Miq.; Mangifera leschenaultii Marchand

= Mangifera foetida =

Species of tree

Mangifera foetida (also called horse mango, malmut, limus, bachang, machang, and kemantan in Borneo) is a species of flowering plant in the family Anacardiaceae. It is found in wet-land rainforest regions of Borneo, Cambodia, Indonesia, Malaysia, Myanmar, Thailand, and Vietnam.

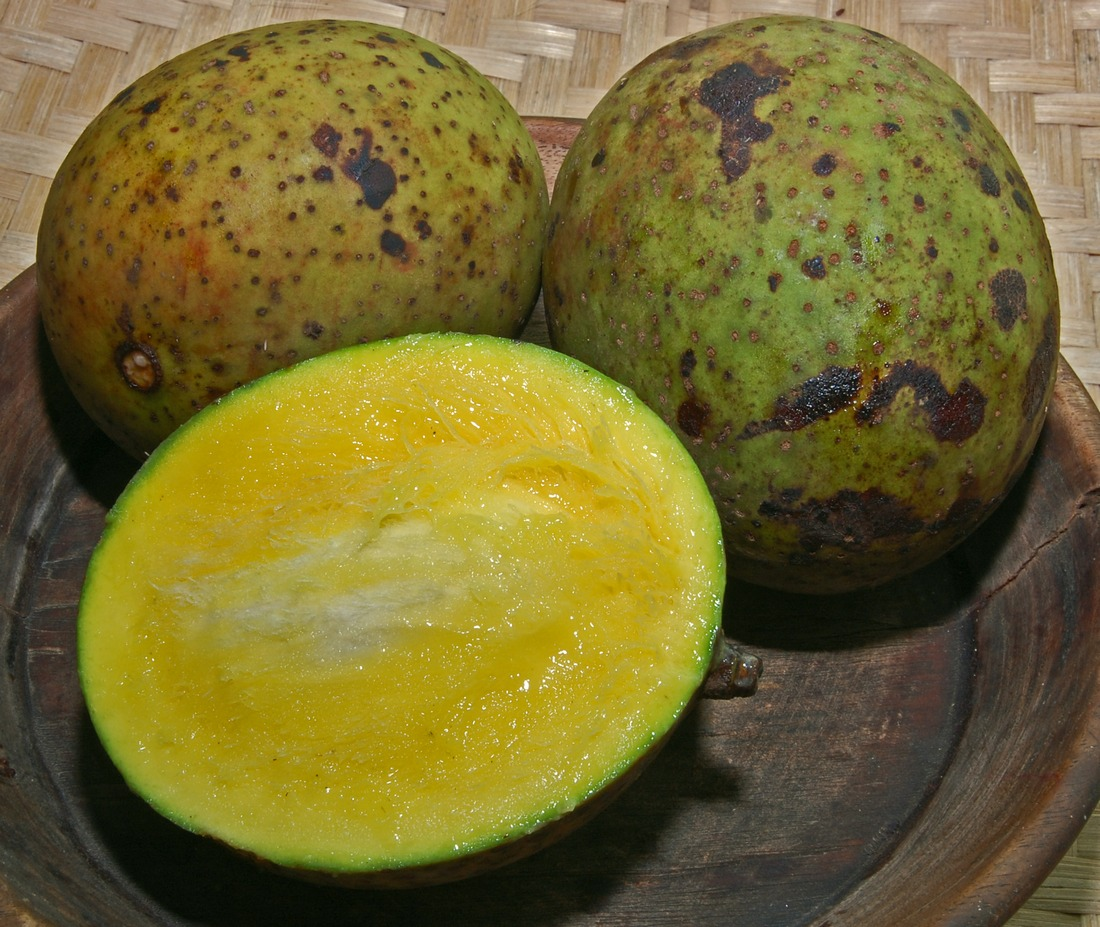
Mangifera foetida from Bogor, West Java, Indonesia

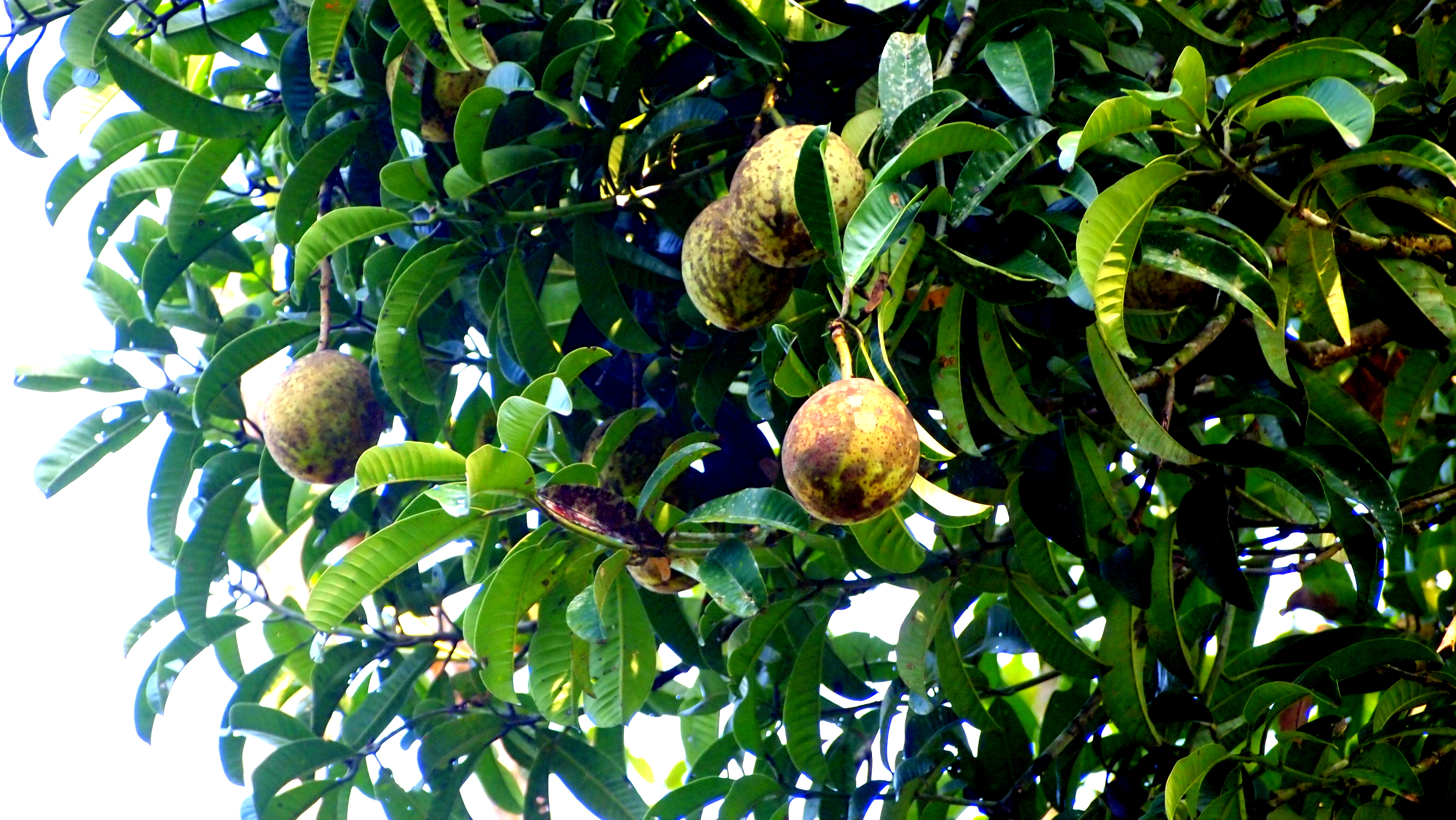
Mangifera foetida in Malaysia

== Description ==
Bachang trees take 6-8 years from planting time to harvest. Propagation is primarily by seed, though budding is also possible.

The fruit is approximately 100-200g and has a very strong smell of turpentine. The ripe fruit contains an irritant that can inflame the lips and mouth.

== Uses ==
In Indonesia, the unripe fruit (after being washed with salt water) is used in vegetable salads (rujak) and in sour pickle (acar). The ripe fruit can also be used to extract the juices or made into jam.

Two known varieties found in Borneo can be very sweet or sour.

Other uses: The seed make good rootstock for grafting other type of mango for it resistant to diseases.
