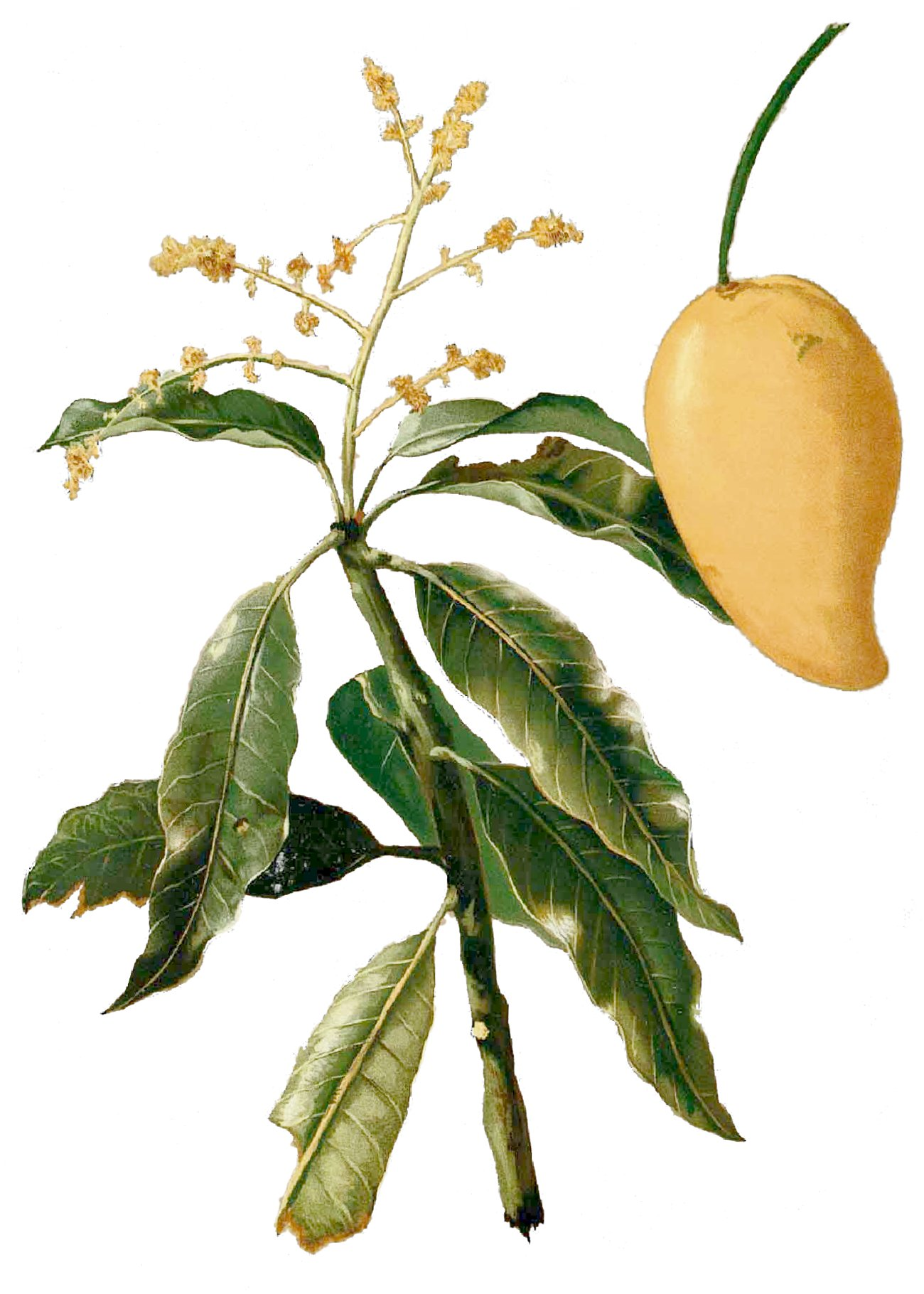

Conservation status
- Least Concern (IUCN 3.1)

Scientific classification
- Kingdom: Plantae
- Clade: Tracheophytes
- Clade: Angiosperms
- Clade: Eudicots
- Clade: Rosids
- Order: Sapindales
- Family: Anacardiaceae
- Genus: Mangifera
- Species: M. sylvatica

Binomial name
- Mangifera sylvatica Roxb.

= Mangifera sylvatica =

Species of tree

Mangifera sylvatica, commonly known as the wild mango, is a species of flowering plant in the family Anacardiaceae. It is native to parts of South and Southeast Asia, where it grows in lowland and hill forests. The tree grows to 6–20 m tall and produces juicy fruits that contain nutrients and ripen from June to August.

== Description ==
Mangifera sylvatica grows 6–20 meters tall. Its branchlets are dark brown and glabrous. The petiole is 3–7 cm long and inflated basally. The leaf blade is lanceolate to oblong-lanceolate, measuring 15–24 × 3–5.5 cm. It is papery or thinly leathery, with a cuneate base, entire margin, acuminate apex, and 16–20 pairs of prominent lateral veins.

The inflorescence is a terminal panicle, 15–33 cm long, with slender primary branches. The pedicels are slender, 3–8 mm long, and articulate. The sepals are ovate to lanceolate. The petals are white, and have 3–5 dark brown veins on the adaxial surface. They are recurved and twisted apically at anthesis. The flower has one fertile stamen, approximately 4 mm long, and one or two staminodes. The ovary is globose, approximately 1.5 mm in diameter, with a subterminal style.

The drupe is oblique and ovate, measuring 6–8 × 4–5 cm. Flowering occurs from April to May, and fruiting occurs from June to August.

== Distribution and habitat ==
Mangifera sylvatica occurs in lowland and hill forests at elevations of 600–1,900 meters. It is found in southern Yunnan, China; Bangladesh; Bhutan; Cambodia; Assam, Darjeeling and Sikkim in India; Myanmar; and Thailand.

== Nutrition ==
Mangifera sylvatica has a large kernel that makes up more than 40% of its body weight. The kernel contains 20.36% carbohydrates, 9.93% fibre, 11.57% fat, as well as various minerals. The fruit pulp is juicy, with approximately 85% moisture. It contains 1.95% carbohydrates, 2% fibre, and minerals such as sodium and potassium. It is also a source of vitamin C.
