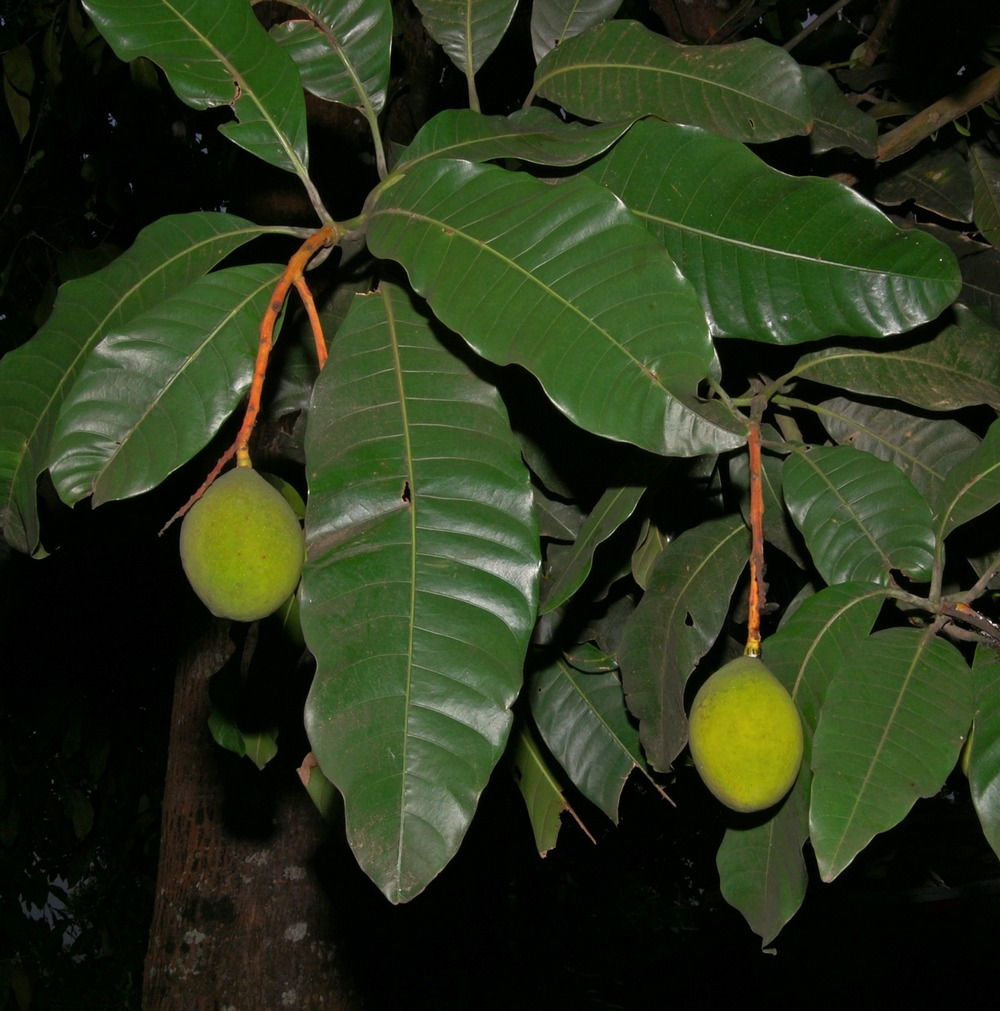

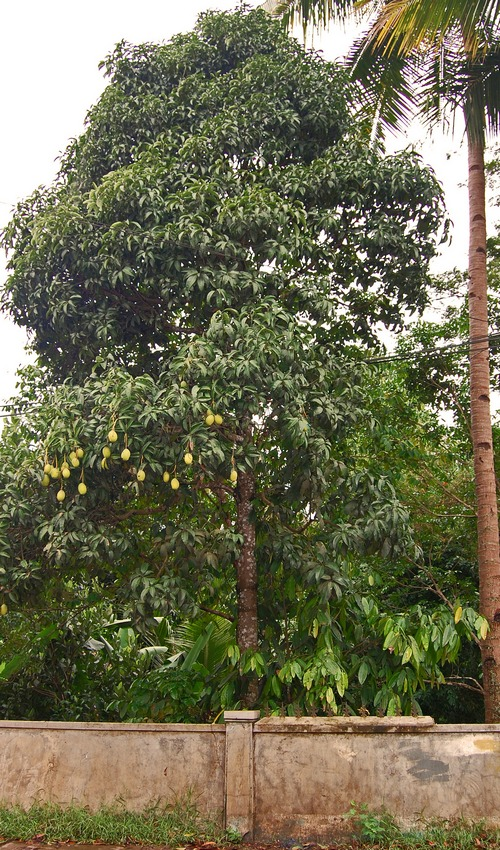
- Mangifera odorata tree from Pandeglang, Banten (western Java), Indonesia

Conservation status
- Data Deficient (IUCN 2.3)

Scientific classification
- Kingdom: Plantae
- Clade: Tracheophytes
- Clade: Angiosperms
- Clade: Eudicots
- Clade: Rosids
- Order: Sapindales
- Family: Anacardiaceae
- Genus: Mangifera
- Species: M. odorata

Binomial name
- Mangifera odorata Griff.

Synonyms
- Mangifera foetida var. odorata (Griff.) Pierre; Mangifera foetida var. bakkill Miq.; Mangifera foetida var. bombom Blume; Mangifera foetida var. kawini Blume; Mangifera foetida var. mollis Blume; Mangifera oblongifolia Hook.f.

= Mangifera odorata =

Species of tree

Mangifera odorata, commonly known as kwini (also spelled kuini, kuweni, kuwini, etc.), huani, or Saipan mango, is a species of plant with edible fruit in the family Anacardiaceae. It is similar to the related mango but is characterized by a strong turpentine-like smell on the skin and fibrous flesh. It is native to tropical Southeast Asia, but its exact original native range is unknown because it is only known from cultivated specimens and is believed to be a hybrid of Mangifera indica and Mangifera foetida. It is grown throughout Southeast Asia, from peninsular Thailand, to Malaysia, Indonesia and the southern Philippines. It has also been occasionally cultivated in southern Vietnam and the Mariana Islands.

== Description ==
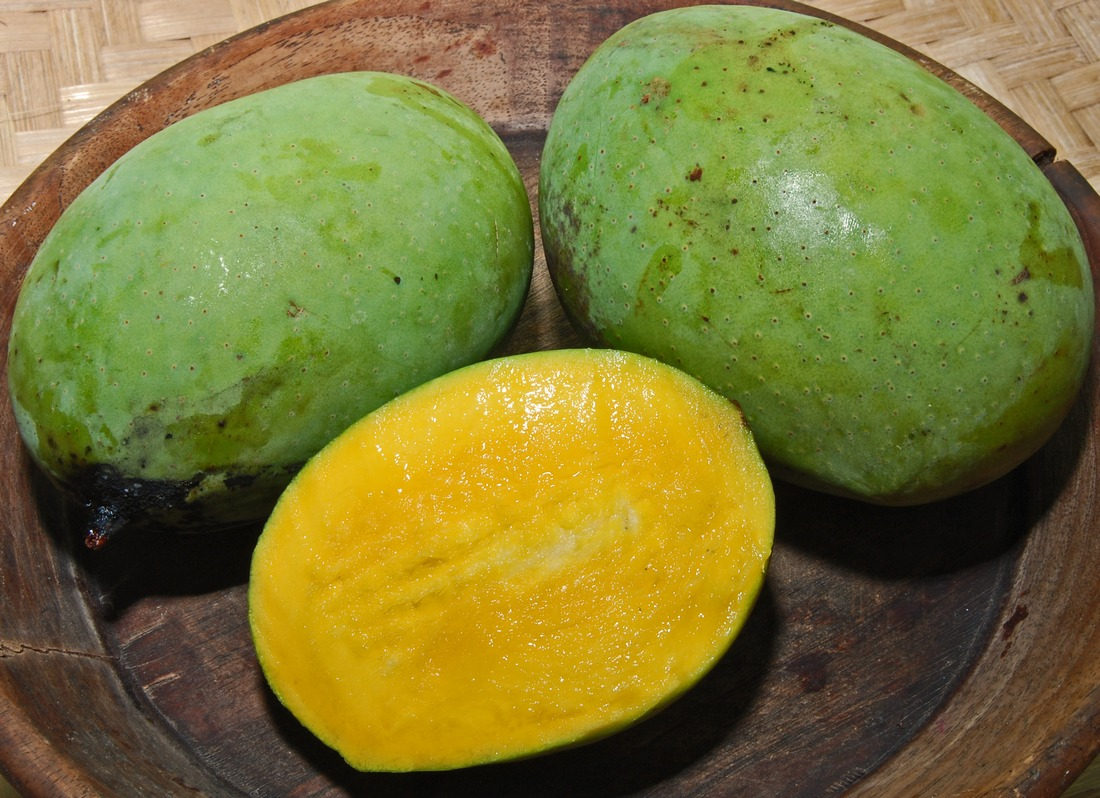
Fruits of Mangifera odorata

The fruit of M. odorata has a skin that is yellow to green in colour. The flesh of the fruit has an orange to yellow colour and is sour or sweet when eaten. The fruits are round in shape and have a smooth skin that range from yellow-green. The tree flowers have a pleasant fragrance.

It is a polymorphic species, and some varieties are known by different names, like the bembem which a stronger smell; the gandarassa of Banten, Indonesia which is sweeter and less pungent; and the sangay of Jolo, Philippines, which has yellow skin when ripe instead of green or yellowish green.

=== Morphology ===
Mangifera odorata is a fruit plant that grows approximately 10–15 m (33–49 ft) in height, hardly ever growing past 20 m (66 ft). The crown has a wide round shape. The trunk stands in an upright straight position that appears to have a grayish colour "containing an irritant sap". Leaf morphology is "oblong-lance shaped" that has a "non-wavy edge". Veins are also noticeable on the leaf.

The plant has flowers are approximately 6 mm wide, emit a pleasant scent as well as appear to be yellowish-green in colour. The rachis has a reddish-brown colour. Petals are lance-shaped and at the base have a yellowish colour but turn dark red later on. The apex or tip of the petal is pale pink in colour. The sepals which appear to be brown-red or partly green in colour look oval shaped and are roughly 3–4 mm long. Within the flower, there is 1 fertile stamen that serve in reproduction and is about 5 mm in length. The staminodes which are approximately 1.5–2 mm long. Another reproductive organ called the ovary is round in shape, yellowish to dark red and about 3–5 mm in length. The pollen is "elliptic and tapering towards poles"

The fruit has a yellow to green skin colour. When it is ripe the skin turns green. The flesh is orange to yellow and can taste sweet or sour when consumed. The seed inside is both flat in shape with a hairy/fibrous surface.

== Distribution and habitat ==
The exact origins of Mangifera odorata are unknown. However, the species represents a hybrid between the mango, Mangifera indica and the horse mango, Mangifera foetida. It is grown throughout Southeast Asia, from peninsular Thailand, Malaysia, Indonesia and the southern Philippines. It has also been occasionally cultivated in southern Vietnam and the Marianas Islands.

Mangifera odorata thrives in tropical wet climates which have both heavy and moderate rainfall. However, they are unable to survive and grow in places that have continuous dry climates. M. odorata is common in cultivation but does not normally grow in the wild.

=== Pests ===
Mangifera odorata is known to be a major host of Bactrocera dorsalis, Ciripestis eutraphera, Coptotermes, Coptotermes cuvignathus, Cryptorhynchus frigidus, Deanolis albizonalis, Marasmiellus scandens and Marasmius crinis-equi.

== As food ==
M. odorata is a fruit which can be consumed. While it can be consumed in its raw form, the fruit is usually made or incorporated into something else such as chutneys. M. odorata fruit pulp is also a good source of nutrition. When M.odorata has not reached maturity, its pulp is a good source for "dietary fibre, vitamin C, vitamin E". The mature pulp is good to eat because of "protein, ash, fat, soluble carbohydrate and B vitamin". The fruit's seed kernel is "rich in fat, protein, carbohydrate, and ash". The peel or skin is a great source of "fibre, minerals, β-Carotene and ascorbic acid".

== Conservation status ==
They are considered to be data deficient and are not label as endangered, threatened, or extinct. Their genetic material is stored in germplasm repositories where it may be used for future cultivar and research uses.
