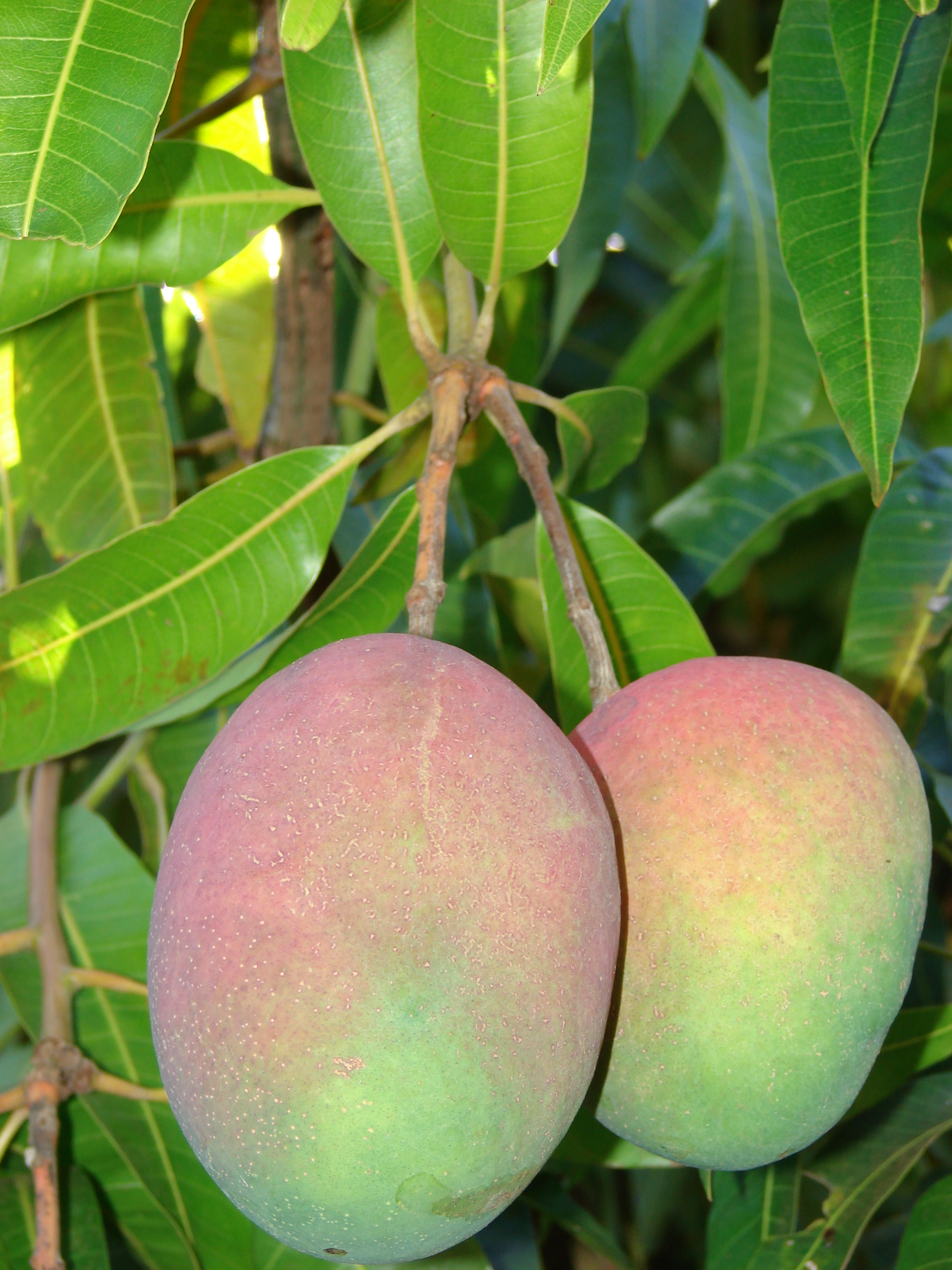
- M. indica fruits

Scientific classification
- Kingdom: Plantae
- Clade: Embryophytes
- Clade: Tracheophytes
- Clade: Spermatophytes
- Clade: Angiosperms
- Clade: Eudicots
- Clade: Rosids
- Order: Sapindales
- Family: Anacardiaceae
- Subfamily: Anacardioideae
- Genus: Mangifera; L.

Type species
- Mangifera indica L.

Synonyms
- Mangas Adans.; Phanrangia Tardieu

= Mangifera =

Mangifera Temporal range: Upper Paleocene–Recent

Genus of flowering plants

Mangifera is a genus of flowering plants in the family Anacardiaceae. It contains 64 species, with the best-known being the common mango (Mangifera indica). The center of diversity of the genus is in the Malesian ecoregion of Southeast Asia, particularly in Sumatra, Borneo, and the Malay Peninsula. They are generally canopy trees in lowland rainforests, reaching a height of 30–40 m (98–131 ft).

== Description ==
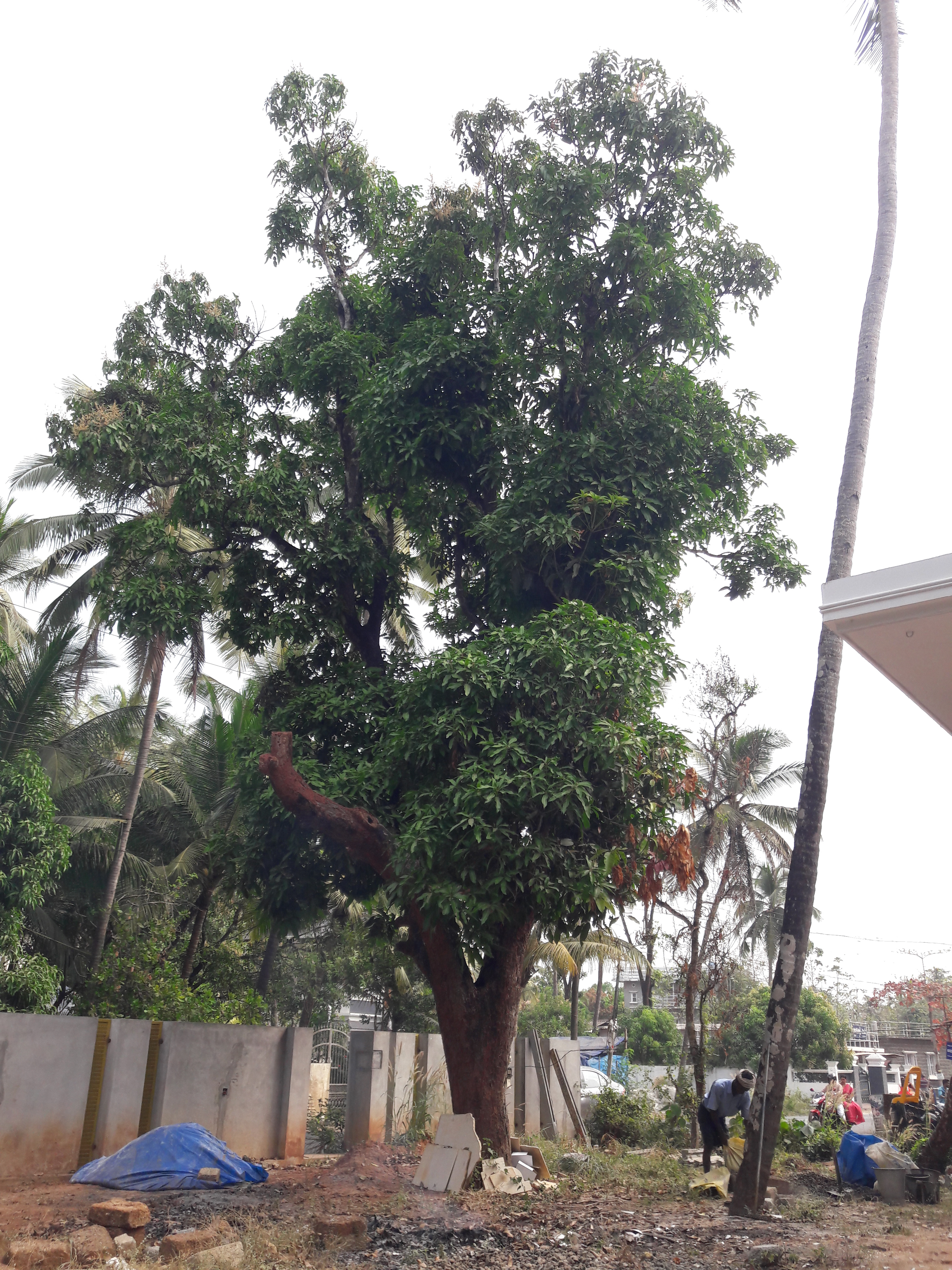
Mangifera indica tree

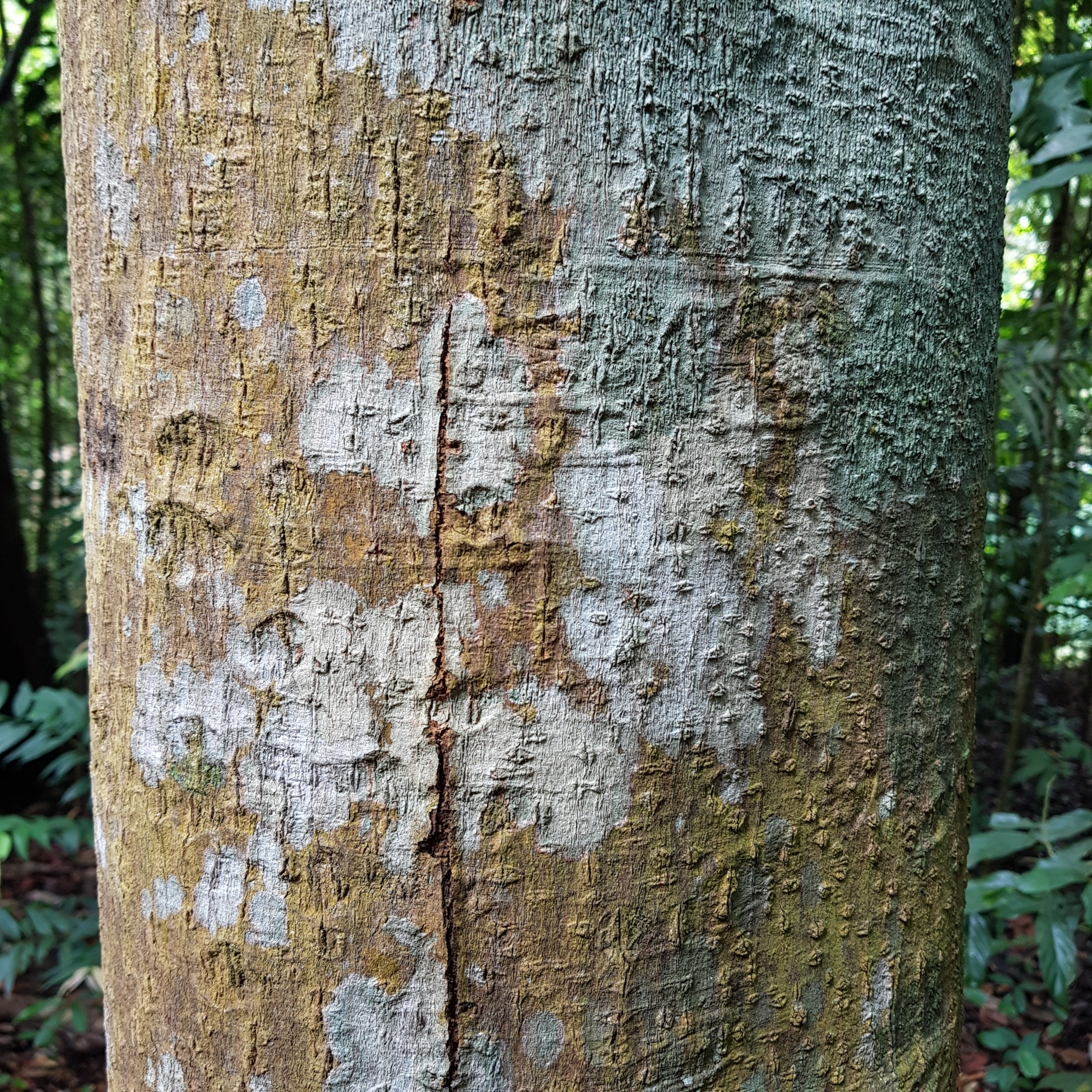
Bark of Mangifera quadrifida

=== Vegetative characteristics ===
Mangifera are evergreen or deciduous, laticiferous or non-laticiferous trees with smooth bark and long tap roots. The simple leaves have an entire margin.

=== Generative characteristics ===
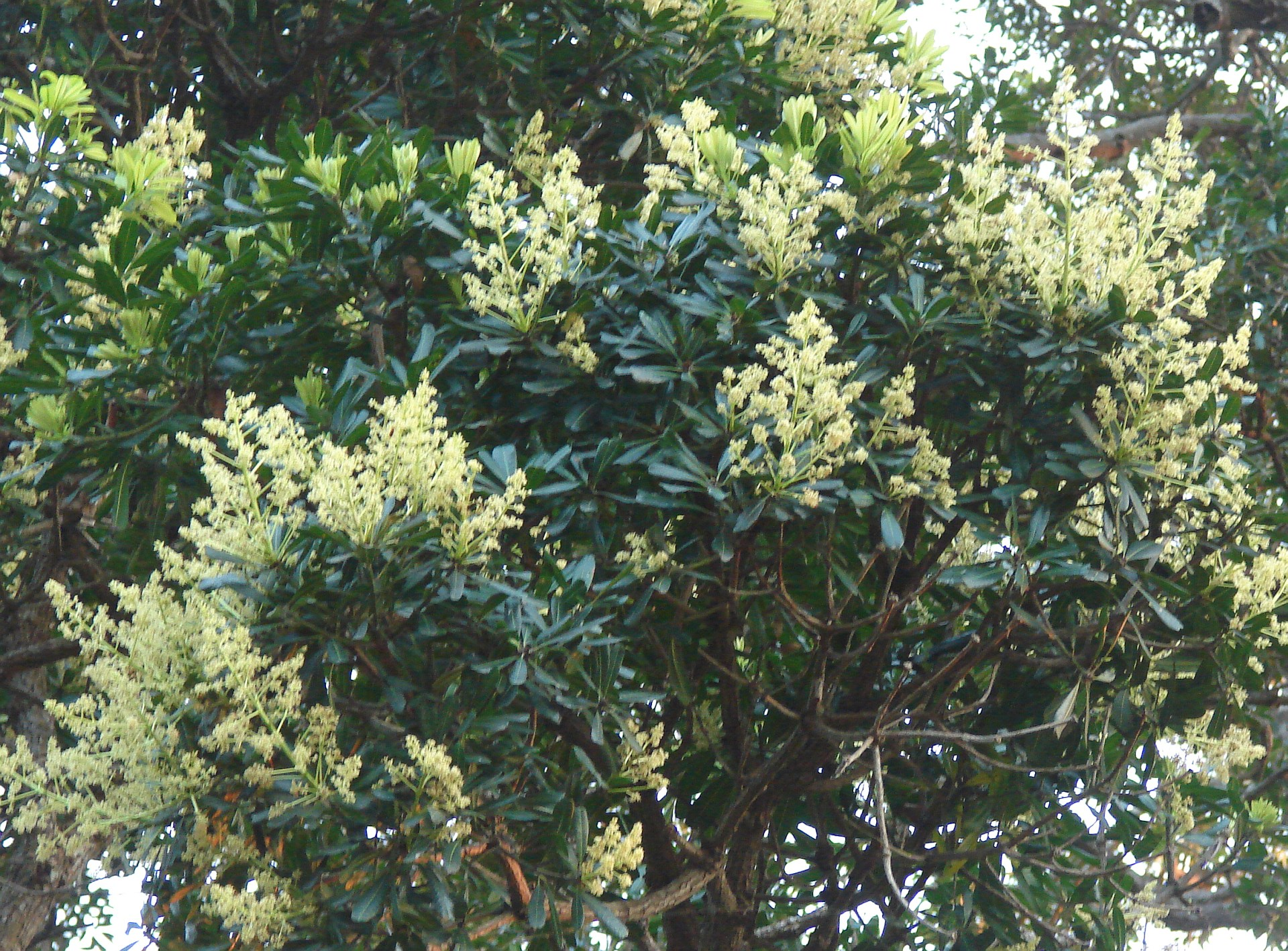
Flowering Mangifera zeylanica

The conical paniculate inflorescence with a stout, thick peduncle bears numerous flowers. The anthers are dorsifixed. The large, fleshy, indehiscent fruit with a fibrous, woody endocarp bears one non-endospermic, flattened, ovoid-oblong seed.

=== Cytology ===
The chromosome count is 2n = 40.

== Taxonomy ==
The genus Mangifera L. was described by Carl Linnaeus in 1753 with Mangifera indica L. as the type species.

=== Subgenera and sections ===
The genus Mangifera is divided into two subgenera and several sections:

- Mangifera subg. Mangifera
  - Mangifera sect. Marchandora Pierre
  - Mangifera sect. Euantherae Pierre
  - Mangifera sect. Rawa Kosterm.
  - Mangifera sect. Mangifera
- Mangifera subg. Limus (Marchand) Kosterm.

=== Species ===
The genus Mangifera has 64 species:

- Mangifera acutigemma Kosterm.
- Mangifera altissima Blanco
- Mangifera andamanica King
- Mangifera applanata Kosterm.
- Mangifera austroindica Kosterm.
- Mangifera blommesteinii Kosterm.
- Mangifera bullata Kosterm.
- Mangifera caesia Jack
- Mangifera caloneura Kurz
- Mangifera campnospermoides Kosterm.
- Mangifera camptosperma Pierre
- Mangifera casturi Kosterm.
- Mangifera cochinchinensis Engl.
- Mangifera collina Kosterm.
- Mangifera decandra Ding Hou
- Mangifera dewildei Kosterm.
- Mangifera dongnaiensis Pierre
- Mangifera duperreana Pierre
- Mangifera flava Evrard
- Mangifera foetida Lour.
- Mangifera gedebe Miq.
- Mangifera gracilipes Hook.f.
- Mangifera griffithii Hook.f.
- Mangifera indica L.
- Mangifera inocarpoides Merr. & L.M.Perry
- Mangifera khasiana Pierre
- Mangifera khoonmengiana Kochummen
- Mangifera lagenifera Griff.
- Mangifera lalijiwa Kosterm.
- Mangifera laurina Blume
- Mangifera linearifolia (Mukh.) Kosterm.
- Mangifera longipetiolata King
- Mangifera macrocarpa Blume
- Mangifera magnifica Kochummen
- Mangifera mariana Buch.-Ham.
- Mangifera merrillii Mukherji
- Mangifera minor Blume
- Mangifera minutifolia Evrard
- Mangifera monandra Merr.
- Mangifera nicobarica Kosterm.
- Mangifera odorata Griff.
- Mangifera pajang Kosterm.
- Mangifera paludosa Kosterm. ex S.K.Ganesan
- Mangifera parvifolia Boerl. & Koord.-Schum.
- Mangifera pedicellata Kosterm.
- Mangifera pentandra Hook.f.
- Mangifera persiciforma C.Y.Wu & T.L.Ming
- Mangifera pseudoindica Kosterm.
- Mangifera quadrifida Jack
- Mangifera reba Pierre
- Mangifera rigida Blume
- Mangifera rufocostata Kosterm.
- Mangifera similis Blume
- Mangifera subsessilifolia Kosterm.
- Mangifera sulavesiana Kosterm.
- Mangifera sumatrana Miq.
- Mangifera sumbawaensis Kosterm.
- Mangifera superba Hook.f.
- Mangifera swintonioides Kosterm.
- Mangifera sylvatica Roxb.
- Mangifera timorensis Blume
- Mangifera torquenda Kosterm.
- Mangifera transversalis Kosterm.
- Mangifera zeylanica (Blume) Hook.f.

=== Fossil record ===
The earliest fossil species thought to be related to Mangifera is Eomangiferophyllum damalgiriense from the upper Paleocene in northeastern India. Leaves have also been reported from the Paleocene of Japan and the Eocene of Germany, though these have been considered questionable. Leaf fossils confidently assignable to Mangifera have been collected from Oligocene or early Miocene sediments in northern Thailand.

=== Formerly placed here ===
- Bouea oppositifolia (Roxb.) Meisn. (as M. oppositifolia Roxb.)
- Buchanania axillaris (Desr.) Ramamoorthy (as M. axillaris Desr.)
- Elaeodendron glaucum (Rottb.) Pers. (as M. glauca Rottb.)
- Irvingia gabonensis (Aubry-Lecomte ex O'Rorke) Baill. (as M. gabonensis Aubry-Lecomte ex O'Rorke)
- Fegimanra africana (Oliv.) Pierre (as M. africana Oliv.)
- Spondias pinnata (L.f.) Kurz (as M. pinnata L.f.)

== Ecology ==
Flies are important pollinators of Mangifera flowers and the flowers are visited by numerous species of flies, wasps, bees, beetles, ants, and butterflies.

== Conservation ==
Most Mangifera species occur as single individuals over wide areas, but are not considered rare. One species, Mangifera casturi , is extinct in the wild.

== Uses ==
Mangifera species are widely cultivated in Asia and elsewhere. More than 27 species in the genus bear edible, fleshy fruits, especially the common mango (M. indica). Others, such as M. foetida, yield astringent fruits that can be eaten pickled. Mango residue, such as the seed kernel and peel, have functional and nutritional potential.
