= André Joseph Guillaume Henri Kostermans =

Dutch botanist (1906–1994)

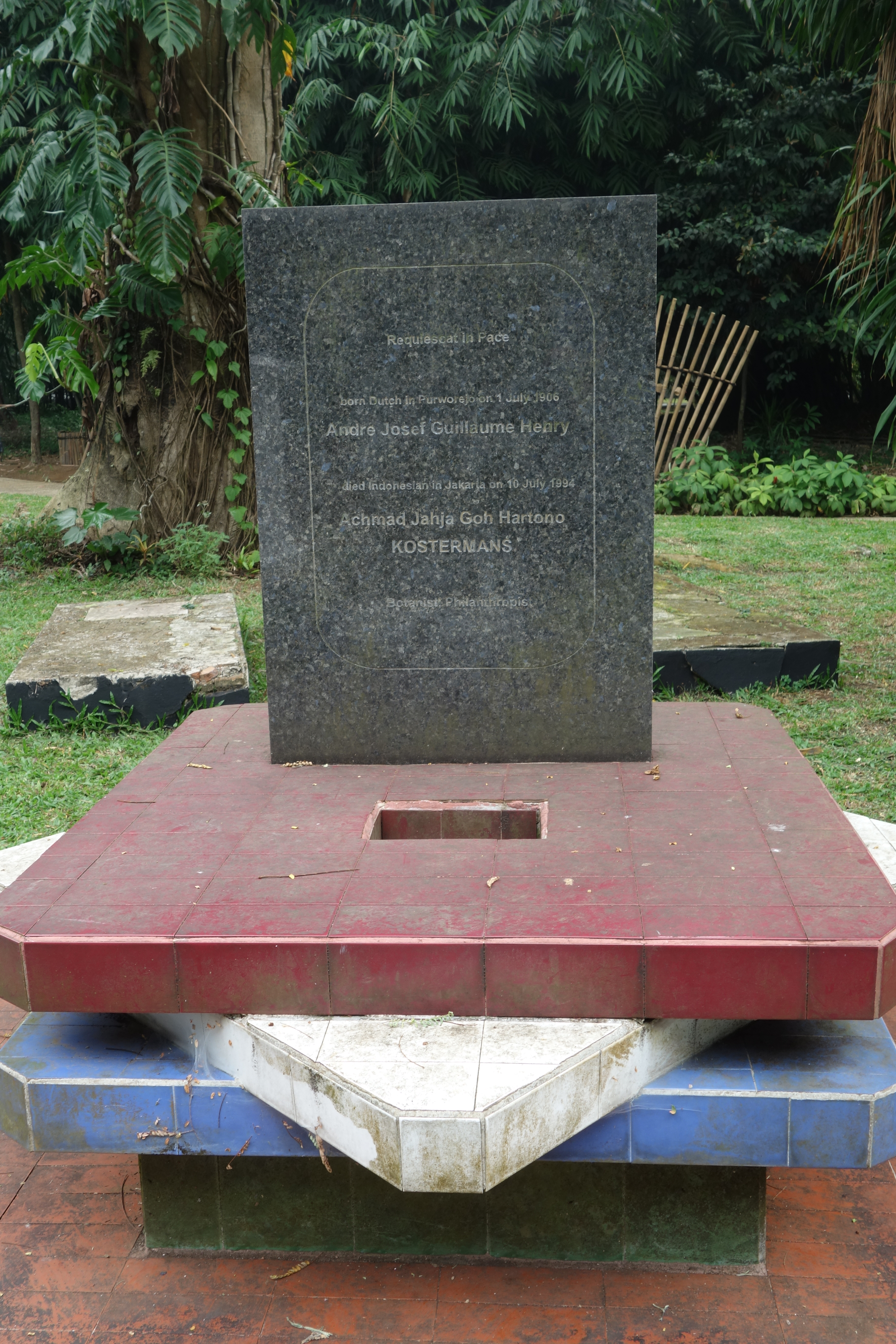
- Kostermans's tomb in Bogor Botanic Gardens
- Born: 1 April 1906; Purworejo, Java, Dutch East Indies
- Died: 10 July 1994 (aged 88); Jakarta, Indonesia
- Resting place: Bogor Botanic Gardens
- Education: Utrecht University
- Scientific career
- Fields: Botany
- Thesis: Studies in South American Malpighiaceae, Lauraceae and Hernandiaceae, Especially of Surinam (1936)
- Author abbrev. (botany): Kosterm

Dr. André Joseph Guillaume Henri 'Dok' Kostermans (1 July 1906 – 10 July 1994) was an Indonesian botanist of Dutch ancestry. He was born in Purworejo, Java, Dutch East Indies, and educated at Utrecht University, taking his doctoral degree in 1936 with a paper on Surinamese Lauraceae.

He spent most of his professional life studying the plants of southeastern Asia, settled at Buitenzorg, later Bogor, Indonesia. At an early stage in his career he also contributed a number of family treatments to Pulle's Flora of Suriname. Kostermans was especially interested in Lauraceae, Malvales (Bombacaceae and Sterculiaceae), and Dipterocarpaceae. In his later years, he turned his attention to Asian Anacardiaceae. He was a productive worker and published extensively on these and other groups.

The genus Kostermansia Soegeng, of the family Bombacaceae, and over 50 species were named in his honour.

Kostermans suffered a heart attack in March 1991, but his letter to his friend written in April 1991 stated "some writing (including) putting the finishing touch to a fat manuscript on the Mango species (69 species) ... If I am lucky I shall have a chance to see it." Kostermans did live to see it published by Academic Press in 1993. He died in Indonesia in 1994.
