= List of endemic mammals of Sri Lanka =

Sri Lanka is home to 21 endemic mammals. 91 terrestrial mammals have been recorded from the country. Additionally there are 28 marine mammals in the oceans surrounding the island. Being an island, Sri Lanka lacks the land area to support large animals. However, fossil evidence of large archaic species of rhinoceroses, hippopotamuses, and lions have been discovered. The flora and fauna of Sri Lanka is mostly understudied. Therefore, the number of endemics could be underestimated. All three endemic genera Solisorex, Feroculus and Srilankamys, of Sri Lanka are monotypic.

The endemic status of two Sri Lankan shrews have undergone changes, as they have been reported in India recently. The Kelaart's long-clawed shrew (Feroculus feroculus) and the Sri Lanka highland shrew (Suncus montanus) were recorded from southern India. At the same time, taxonomic revisions have indicated that the flame-striped jungle squirrel (Funambulus layardi), the red slender loris (Loris tardigradus) and two species of mouse deer, Moschiola meminna and M. kathygre are endemic to Sri Lanka. That leaves the number of endemic mammals in Sri Lanka at 16. A group of researchers described a shrew species Crocidura hikmiya from the Sinharaja Forest Reserve in 2007. That discovery left the ultimate number of endemics at 21 at present.

For Sri Lanka, small mammals are of special importance as they constitute a notable portion of the mammalian fauna of the country. Of the 91 species of mammals recorded in the country, 31 are rodents and shrews. Furthermore, they are also of significant importance to biology, as they make up a large part of the country's endemic faunal component. The endemic small mammals include six rodents and four shrews. Many of these endemic species are found in fragmented rainforests in southwestern Sri Lanka, which are highly vulnerable to habitat destruction. As a result, many of these species have been categorised as threatened or endangered at the national level.

== Endemic mammals ==
Most endemic mammals are small nocturnal mammals that are seen rarely.

Low vulnerability

Least concern
Near threatened

Threatened

Vulnerable
Endangered

=== Order Primate: primates ===
Name	Species authority	Red List
Family Lorisidae: lorises
Red slender loris	Loris tardigradus (Linnaeus, 1758)	
Family Cercopithecidae: Old World monkeys
Toque macaque	Macaca sinica (Linnaeus, 1771)	
Purple-faced langur	Trachypithecus vetulus (Erxleben, 1777)	

=== Order Rodentia: rodents ===
Name	Species authority	Red List
Family Sciuridae: squirrels
Layard's palm squirrel	Funambulus layardi (Blyth, 1849)	
Dusky palm squirrel	Funambulus obscurus (Waterhouse, 1838)	
Family Muridae: Old World rats and mice
Mayor's mouse	Mus mayori (Thomas, 1915)	
Ceylon spiny mouse	Mus fernandoni (Phillips, 1932)	
Nillu rat	Rattus montanus Phillips, 1932	
Ohiya rat	Srilankamys ohiensis (Phillips, 1929)	
Nolthenius's long-tailed climbing mouse	Vandeleuria nolthenii Phillips, 1929	

=== Order Soricomorpha: shrews and moles ===
Name	Species authority	Red List
Family Soricidae: shrews
Sri Lankan long-tailed shrew	Crocidura miya Phillips, 1929	
Sinharaja shrew	Crocidura hikmiya Meegaskumbura, Meegaskumbura, Manamendra-Arachchi, Pethiyagoda, & Schneider, 2007	
Pearson's long-clawed shrew	Solisorex pearsoni Thomas, 1924	
Jungle shrew	Suncus zeylanicus Phillips, 1928	
Sri Lankan shrew	Suncus fellowesgordoni Phillips, 1932	

=== Order Carnivora: carnivorans ===
Name	Species authority	Red List
Family Viverridae: civets
Golden palm civet	Paradoxurus zeylonensis (Pallas, 1778)	
Golden dry zone palm civet	Paradoxurus stenocephalus groves et al., 2009	
Sri Lanka brown palm civet	Paradoxurus montanus Kelaart, 1852	

=== Order Artiodactyla: even-toed ungulates ===
Name	Species authority	Red List
Family Tragulidae: chevrotains
Sri Lankan spotted chevrotain	Moschiola meminna Erxleben, 1777	
Yellow-striped chevrotain	Moschiola kathygre Groves & Meijaard, 2005	
