= Sinharaja Forest Reserve =

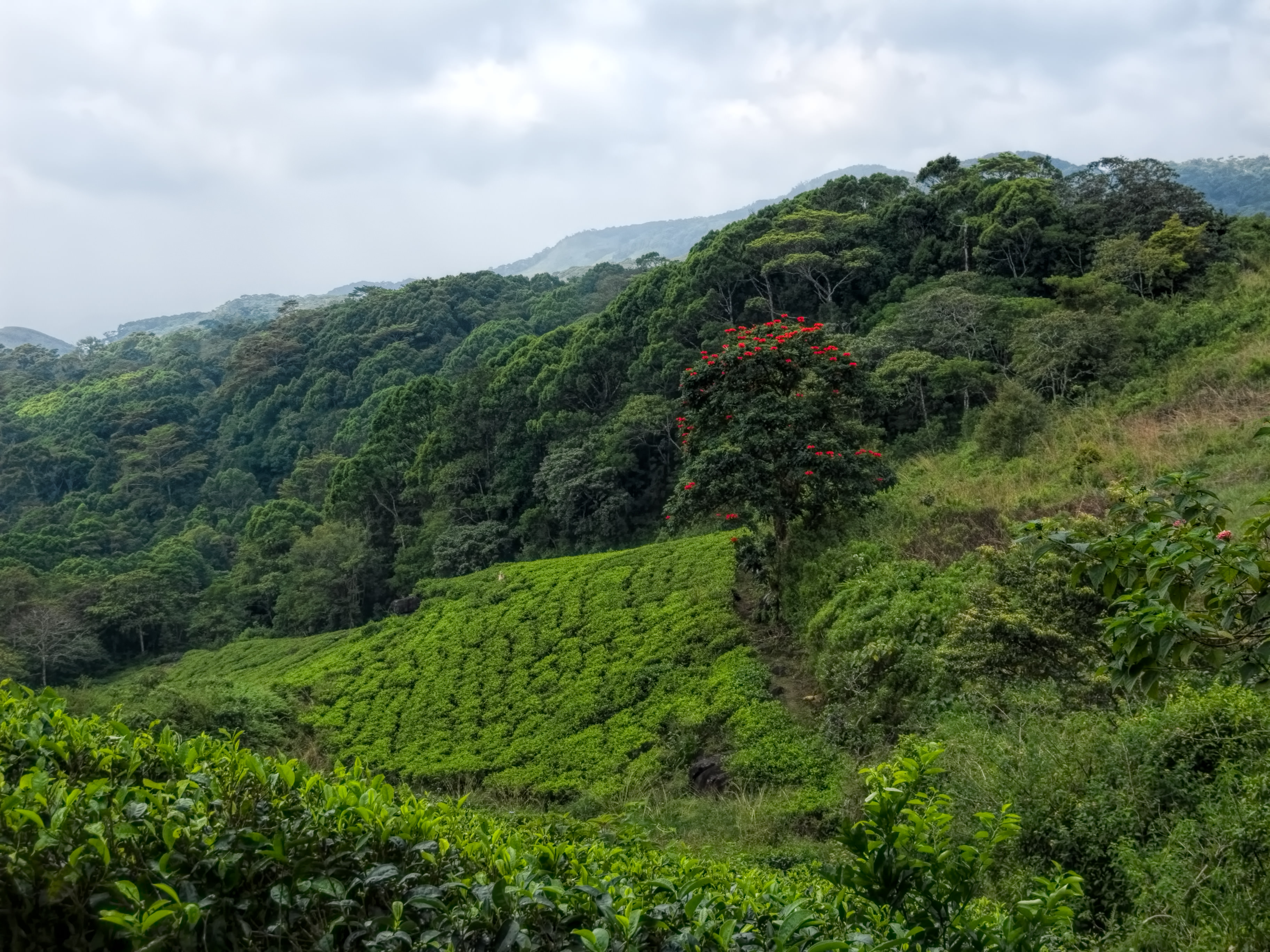
- View of Sinharaja Forest Reserve with tea garden
- Interactive map of Sinharaja Forest Reserve
- Location: Sabaragamuwa and Southern Provinces, Sri Lanka
- Nearest city: Rakwana
- Coordinates: 6°25′00″N 80°30′00″E
- Area: 88.64 km^{2} (34.22 sq mi)
- Established: April, 1978
- Governing body: Department of Forest Conservation

UNESCO World Heritage Site
- Criteria: Natural: ix, x
- Reference: 405
- Inscription: 1988 (12th Session)

Sinharaja Forest Reserve is the last virgin Rainforest left in Sri Lanka. Home to many rare endemic flora and fauna, it has been designated a World Heritage Site by UNESCO.

Formed during the Jurassic period (from 200 to 145 million years ago), Sinharaja forest is the most dense rain forest in Asia.The total vegetation density has been estimated to be around 240,000 plants per hectare.

== Features ==
Over 60% of the trees are endemic, many of them considered rare. It is home to 19 of Sri Lanka's 20 endemic birds, including the elusive red-faced malkoha, green-billed coucal and Sri Lanka blue magpie.

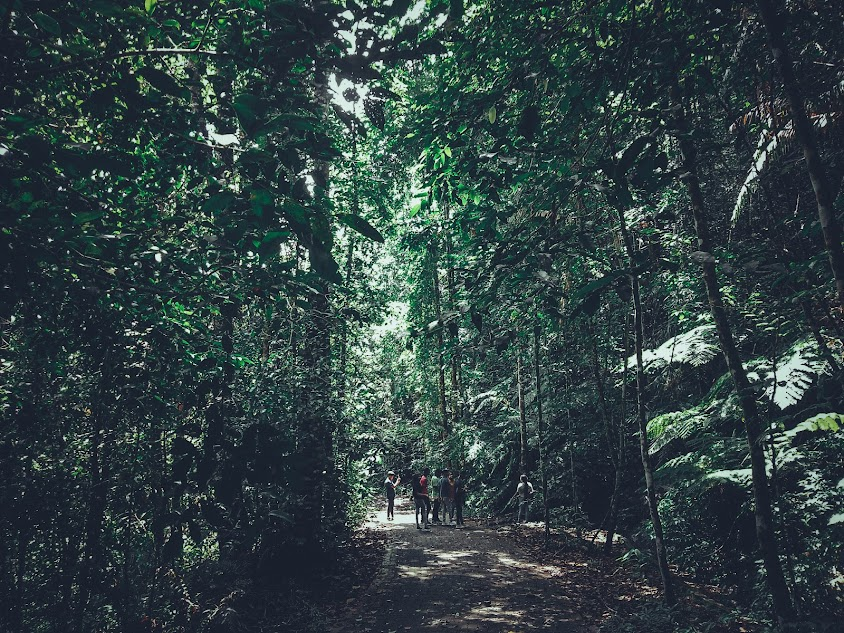
forest cover of Sinharaja

Reptiles include the endemic green pit viper, hump-nosed viper, a large variety of amphibians (especially tree frogs) and invertebrates include the endemic Sri Lankan birdwing butterfly and leeches.

The endemic, giant Anthoshorea stipularis tree, in the Kudawa area of Sinharaja Forest Reserve

Alsophila sinuata; an endemic tree fern species, in Sinharaja Forest Reserve

== Geography ==
=== Location ===
Sinharaja Forest Reserve covers most of the Kalu Ganga basin and a small part of the northern Gin Ganga. Most of the forest (60%) is contained within the borders of Rathnapura District. The other parts include Galle District with 20% and Kaluthara District with 20%.

=== Natural ===
The rainforest likely formed during the Jurassic period (from 200 million years to 145 million years ago). This forest encompasses an area of 36,000 hectares (88,960 acres/360 km^{2}).

== Human activity ==
The reserve is well-integrated with the local population who live in some dozens of villages dotted along the border. The locals collect herbal medicine, edible fruits, nuts, mushrooms, other non-timber forest products including bees honey and a sugary sap collected from a local palm species of the genus Caryota.

In 2013, UNESCO requested to halt the widening of the ancient road linking Lankagama area to Deniyaya along a 1-km jungle patch inside the protected area after a complaint from the Centre for Environmental and Nature Studies of Sri Lanka. A group of environmentalists carried out a social media campaign and asked the authorities to stop

Martin Wijesinhe was one of the most significant people in Sri Lanka in connection to the Sinharaja, unofficial guardian and caretaker of it since the 1950s till his death in 2021.

In March 2021, an expose of the extent of deforestation inside the Reserve by the environmentalist Bhagya Abeyratne received widespread media attention.

== Tourism ==
The Sinharaja Forest Reserve is open to the public and accessible to tourists through four main entrances: Weddagala (north-west), Rakwana (north-east), Neluwa (south-west), and Deniyaya–Mederipitiya (South-East).

In accordance with conservation regulations, all visitors are required to enter the forest accompanied by a licensed guide. A variety of guided hiking tours are available, led by certified Sri Lankan tour guides, offering insights into the forest's rich biodiversity and ecological significance.

== Endemic Mammals ==
- Sri Lankan elephant (Elephas maximus maximus)
- Sri Lankan leopard (Panthera pardus kotiya)
- Sri Lankan deer (Rusa unicolor unicolor)
- Sri Lankan spotted chevrotain (Moschiola meminna)
- Sri Lankan jackal (Canis aureus naria)
- Toque macaque (Macaca sinica)
- Red slender loris (Loris tardigradus)
- Purple-faced langur (Semnopithecus vetulus)
- Sinharaja shrew (Crocidura hikmiya)
- Golden palm civet (Paradoxurus zeylonensis)
- Paradoxurus aureus
- Golden dry-zone palm civet (Paradoxurus stenocephalus)
- Sri Lankan brown palm civet (Paradoxurus montanus)
- Yellow-striped chevrotain (Moschiola kathygre)

Sinharaja Forest Reserve supports the last two remaining lowland rainforest elephant individuals in the country.

Elephants in Sinharaja Forest Reserve

== See also ==
- Protected areas of Sri Lanka
