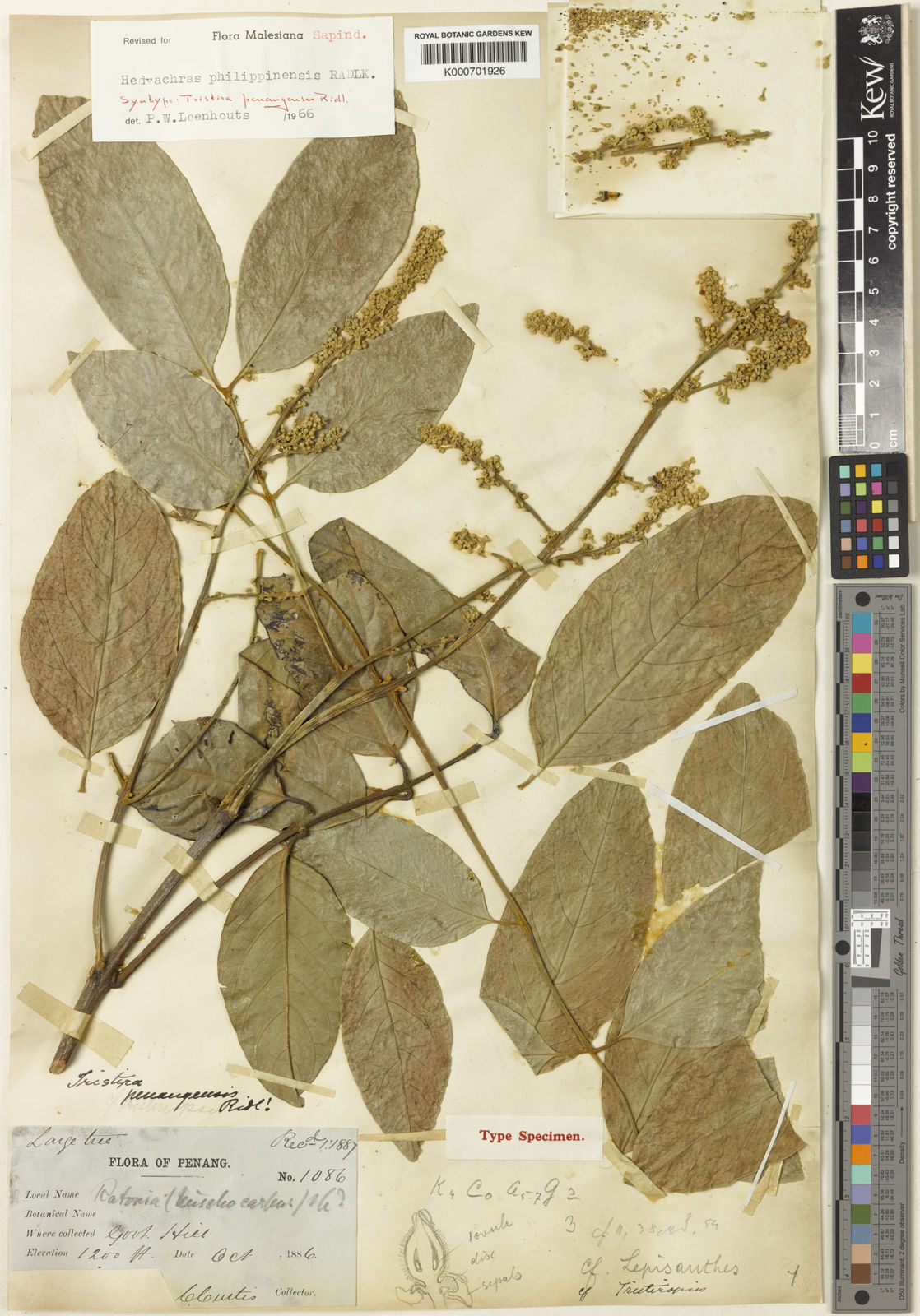
- type specimen at the Royal Botanic Gardens, Kew

Scientific classification
- Kingdom: Plantae
- Clade: Tracheophytes
- Clade: Angiosperms
- Clade: Eudicots
- Clade: Rosids
- Order: Sapindales
- Family: Sapindaceae
- Genus: Glenniea
- Species: G. philippinensis

Binomial name
- Glenniea philippinensis (Radlk.) Leenh.
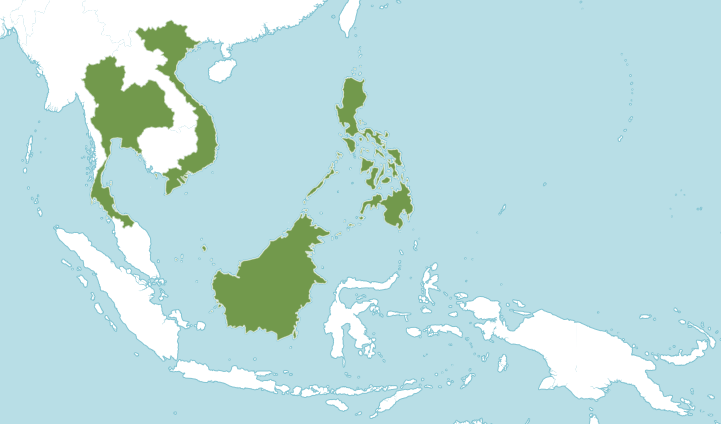

Synonyms
- Hedyachras philippinensis Radlk.; Crossonephelis philippinensis (Radlk.) Leenh.

= Glenniea philippinensis =

Species of flowering plant

Glenniea philippinensis is a species of flowering plant, a tropical forest fruit-tree in the lychee family, that is native to Southeast Asia.

== Description ==
The species grows as a tree to 15–25 m in height, with a 5 m bole and small buttresses. The pinnate leaves have 3–6 pairs of opposite leaflets. The axillary inflorescences consist of panicles of small white flowers. The smooth, round fruits, green ripening yellow, have an edible, yellow mesocarp.

== Distribution and habitat ==
The species is found in Thailand, Vietnam, the Malay Peninsula, the Philippines and Borneo. It occurs in mixed hill forest at an elevation of 300–800 m.
