= A. C. Tutein-Nolthenius =

Ceylonese planter (1892–1954)

- Born: Adriaan Constant Tutein-Nolthenius; 16 September 1892; Vlissingen, Netherlands
- Died: 13 October 1954 (aged 62); Bandarawela, Ceylon
- Burial place: St. Andrew's Church, Haputale
- Occupations: Planter, naturalist

Adriaan Constant Tutein-Nolthenius (16 September 1892 – 13 October 1954) was a Dutch-born Ceylonese tea planter, amateur naturalist, author and appointed member of parliament.

== Biography ==
Adriaan Constant Tutein-Nolthenius was born on 16 September 1892 in Vlissingen, Netherlands, the oldest son and second child of Henri Paul Jules Tutein Nolthenius (1861–1930), a Burgemeester, and Petronella Adriana van Haeften (1868–1942). He emigrated to Ceylon, taking on British nationality in 1921. Tutein-Nolthenius married Marjorie née Fellowes-Gordon (1885–?), Harry Fellowes-Gordon's sister and Denis Rynd's widow (1883–?). In 1925 he owned a tea plantation in West Haputale, adjoining the Horton Plains National Park.

In late 1931, he authored 37 years of Game Protection in Ceylon. A short history of the Ceylon Game and Fauna Protection Society, 1894 to 1931, which records the activities of the Ceylon Game and Fauna Protection Society from when it was first established on 23 May 1894 by E. Gordon Reeves as the Ceylon Game Protection Society to the date of the publication. The book documents the Society's campaign to prevent the indiscriminate slaughter of game for profit.

An amateur naturalist, he was responsible for collecting several species of animals from the central highlands, including the Sri Lankan Highland Tree Mouse (Vandeleuria nolthenii) in 1929, the Sri Lankan shrew (Suncus fellowesgordoni) in 1932, and a pair of rare Horton Plains slender loris (Loris tardigradus nycticeboides) in 1937.

He was appointed a member of the Parliament of Ceylon on 9 June 1952 and died on 13 October 1954 in Bandarawela. He was buried at St. Andrews Church, Haputale.

== Bibliography ==
- Tutein-Nolthenius, A. C. (1931). 37 years of Game Protection in Ceylon. A short history of the Ceylon Game and Fauna Protection Society, 1894 to 1931. Colombo: Times of Ceylon.
