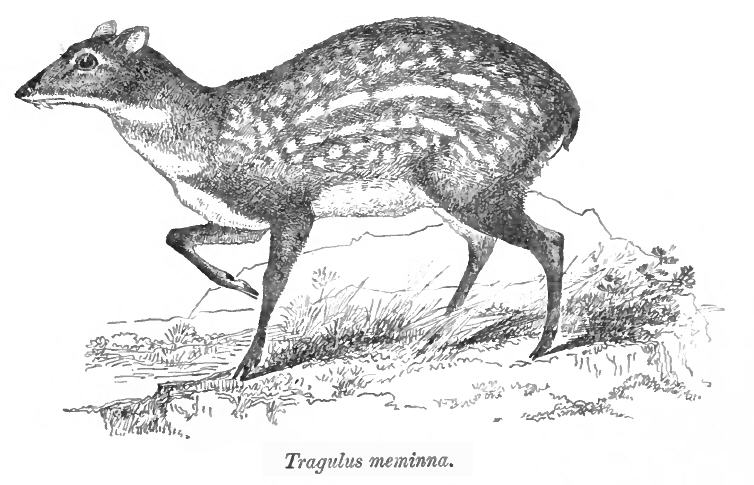
- "Tragulus meminna" from the Fauna of British India

Scientific classification
- Kingdom: Animalia
- Phylum: Chordata
- Class: Mammalia
- Order: Artiodactyla
- Family: Tragulidae
- Genus: Moschiola; Gray, 1852

Type species
- Moschus meminna Erxleben, 1777
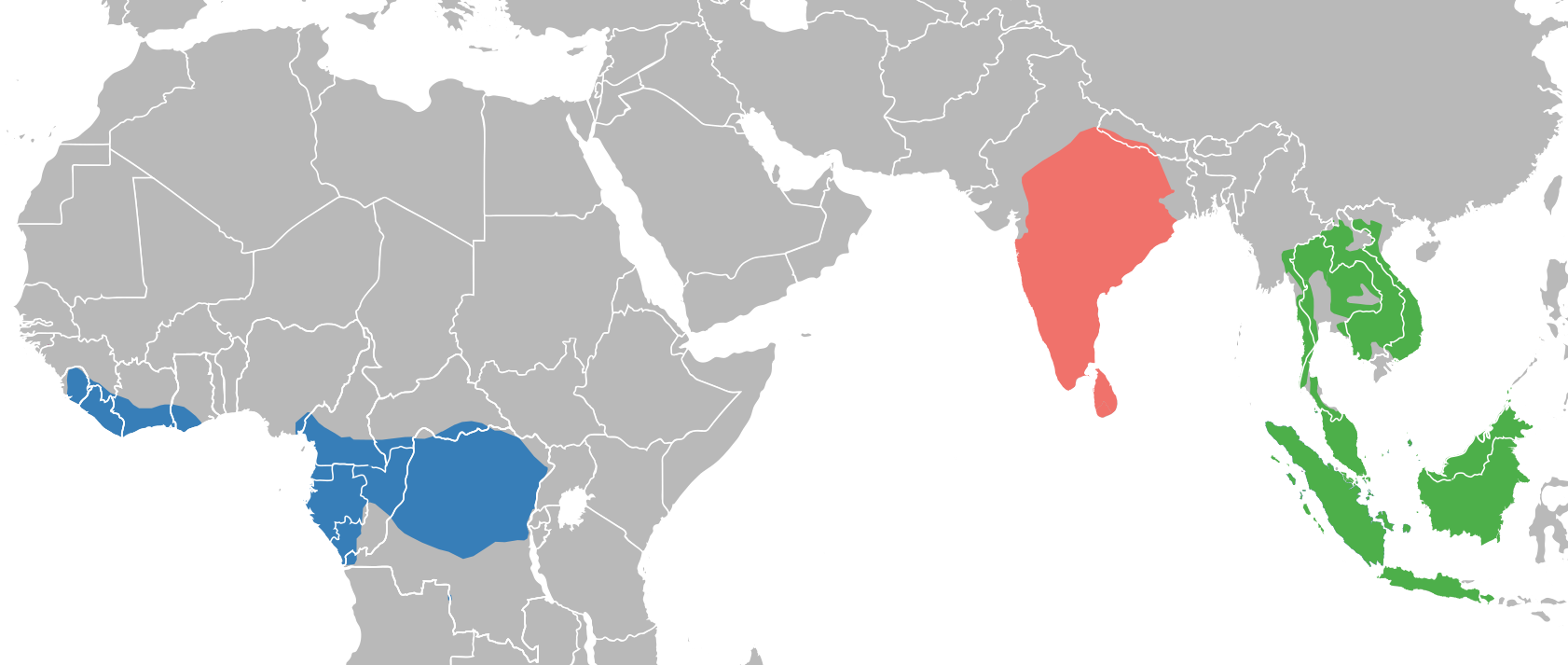
- Tragulidae distribution Moschiola in red

= Moschiola =

Genus of mammals

Moschiola, the spotted chevrotains, are a genus of small even-toed ungulates in the family Tragulidae. They are found in forests in India, Sri Lanka and perhaps Nepal, and have pale-spotted or -striped upperparts unlike the other Asian members of the family, the mouse-deer of the genus Tragulus.

In former times, the genus was usually treated as monotypic. Described as Moschus meminna, for most of the time the name Tragulus meminna was used, but changed to Moschiola meminna eventually. In the 21st century, this is increasingly divided into up to three parapatric species:

Image	Scientific name	Common name	Distribution
	M. meminna sensu stricto	Sri Lankan spotted chevrotain	drier parts of Sri Lanka
	M. indica	Indian spotted chevrotain	South Asian mainland north to Nepal
	M. kathygre	Yellow-striped chevrotain	humid parts of Sri Lanka
