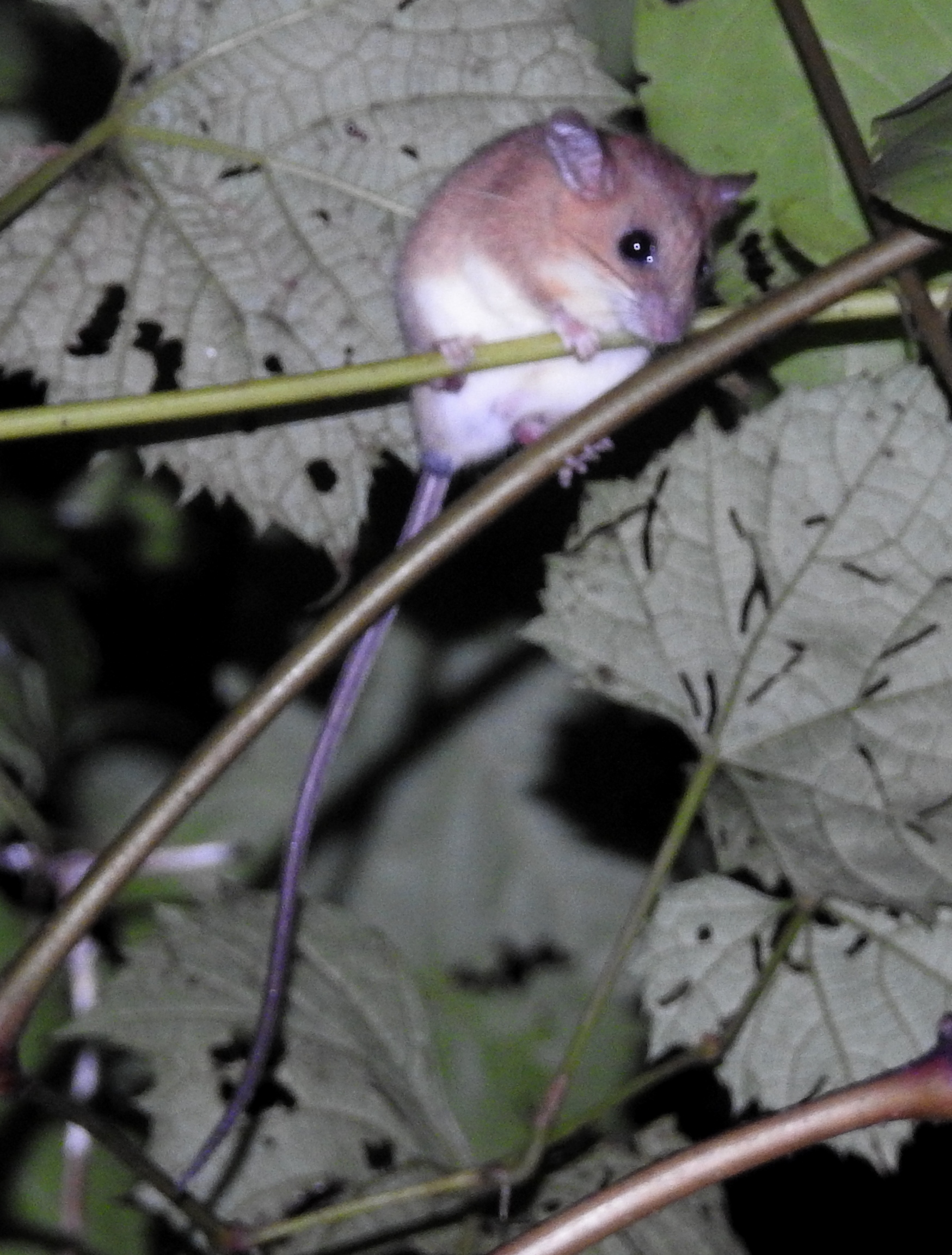
- Asiatic long-tailed climbing mouse (Vandeleuria oleracea)

Scientific classification
- Domain: Eukaryota
- Kingdom: Animalia
- Phylum: Chordata
- Class: Mammalia
- Order: Rodentia
- Family: Muridae
- Subfamily: Murinae
- Tribe: Vandeleurini; Pagès et al., 2015
- Genus: Vandeleuria; Gray, 1842

Type species
- Mus oleraceus

Species
- Vandeleuria nilagirica Vandeleuria nolthenii Vandeleuria oleracea

= Vandeleuria =

Vandeleuria Temporal range: Early Pleistocene to Recent

Genus of rodents

Vandeleuria is a small genus of rodent from Asia with only three species. It is the only member of the tribe Vandeleurini. Species in this genus are known as the long-tailed climbing mice.

== Species ==
- Nilgiri long-tailed tree mouse, Vandeleuria nilagirica Jerdon, 1867
- Nolthenius's long-tailed climbing mouse, Vandeleuria nolthenii Phillips, 1929
- Asiatic long-tailed climbing mouse, Vandeleuria oleracea Bennett, 1832
