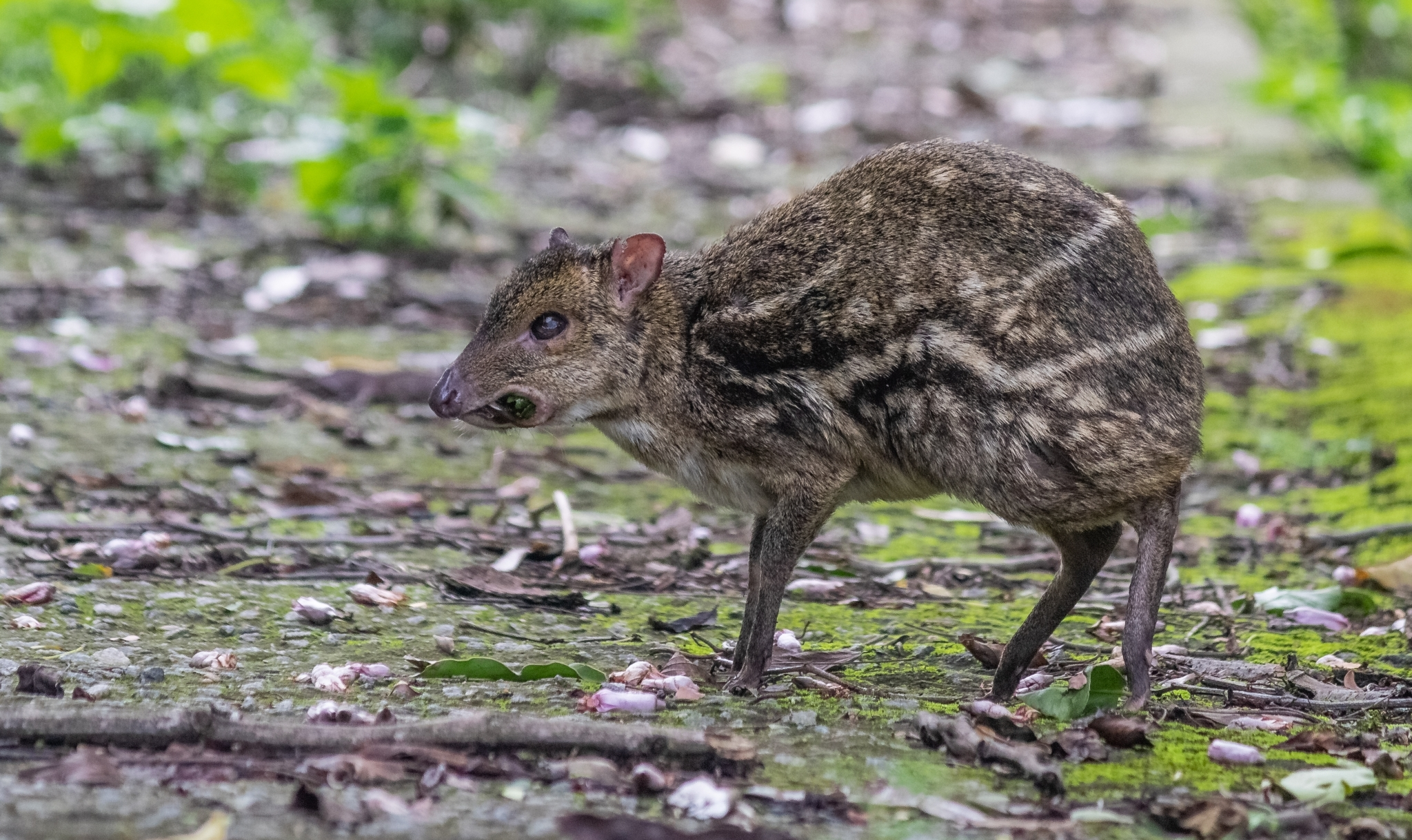
- Indian spotted chevrotain in the Nilgiris, India.

Conservation status
- Least Concern (IUCN 3.1)

Scientific classification
- Kingdom: Animalia
- Phylum: Chordata
- Class: Mammalia
- Order: Artiodactyla
- Family: Tragulidae
- Genus: Moschiola
- Species: M. indica

Binomial name
- Moschiola indica (Gray, 1852)
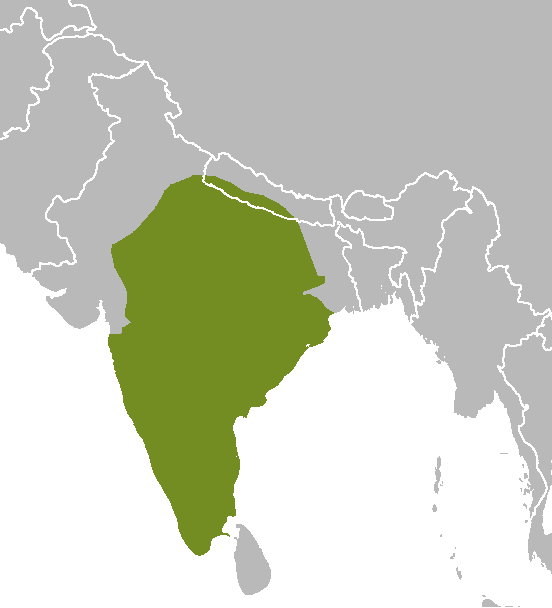

Synonyms
- Tragulus meminna (in part)

= Indian spotted chevrotain =

Species of mammal

The Indian spotted chevrotain (Moschiola indica) is a species of even-toed ungulate in the family Tragulidae. It is native to India and possibly Nepal. It lives in rainforests and is nocturnal. It has a body length of 57.5 cm (22.6 in) with a 2.5 cm (0.98 in) long tail length and weighs around 3 kg (6.6 lb). This was earlier included under the name of Tragulus meminna, but studies on the systematics of the group have led to that name being restricted to the Sri Lankan spotted chevrotain.
