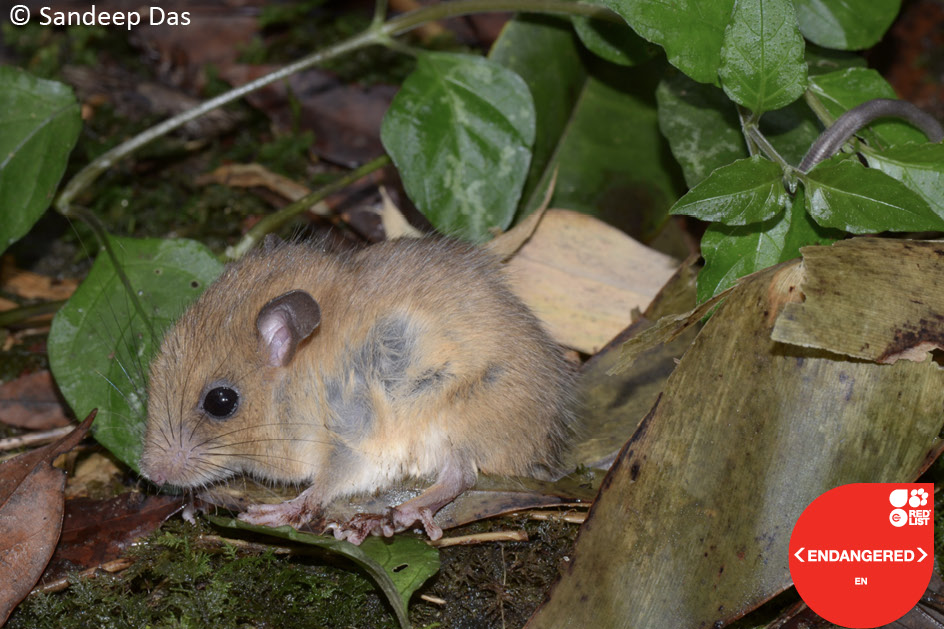

Conservation status
- Endangered (IUCN 3.1)

Scientific classification
- Kingdom: Animalia
- Phylum: Chordata
- Class: Mammalia
- Order: Rodentia
- Family: Muridae
- Genus: Vandeleuria
- Species: V. nilagirica

Binomial name
- Vandeleuria nilagirica Jerdon, 1867
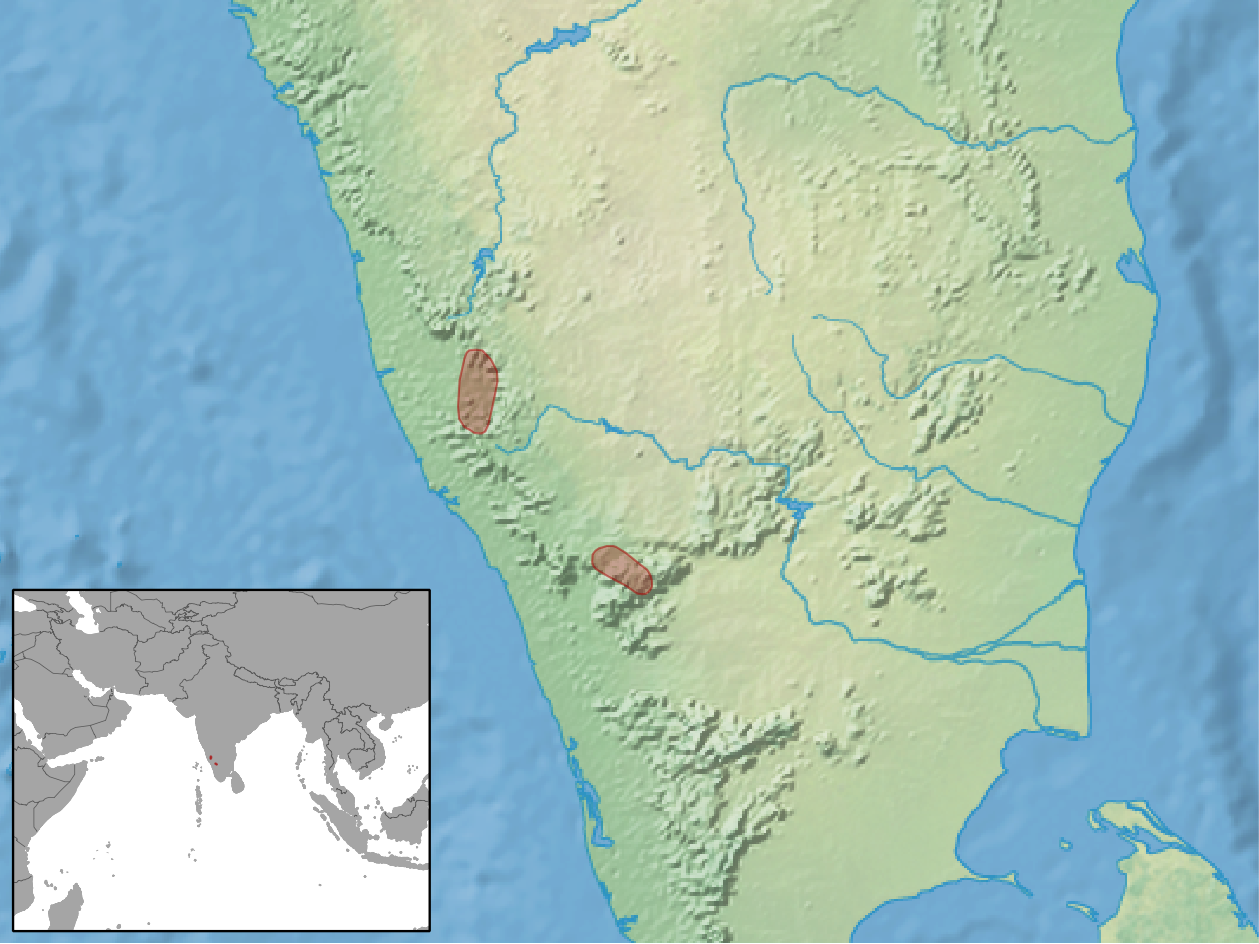

= Nilgiri long-tailed tree mouse =

Nigiri long-tailed tree mouse

Species of rodent

Nigiri vandeleuria (Vandeleuria nilagirica), also known as the Nigiri long-tailed tree mouse and the Indian long-tailed tree mouse, is a species of rodent in the family Muridae. There has been some dispute as to whether this specimen is actually a subspecies of the Asiatic long-tailed climbing mouse but current opinion seems to suggest that it is indeed a separate species. It is found in India.
