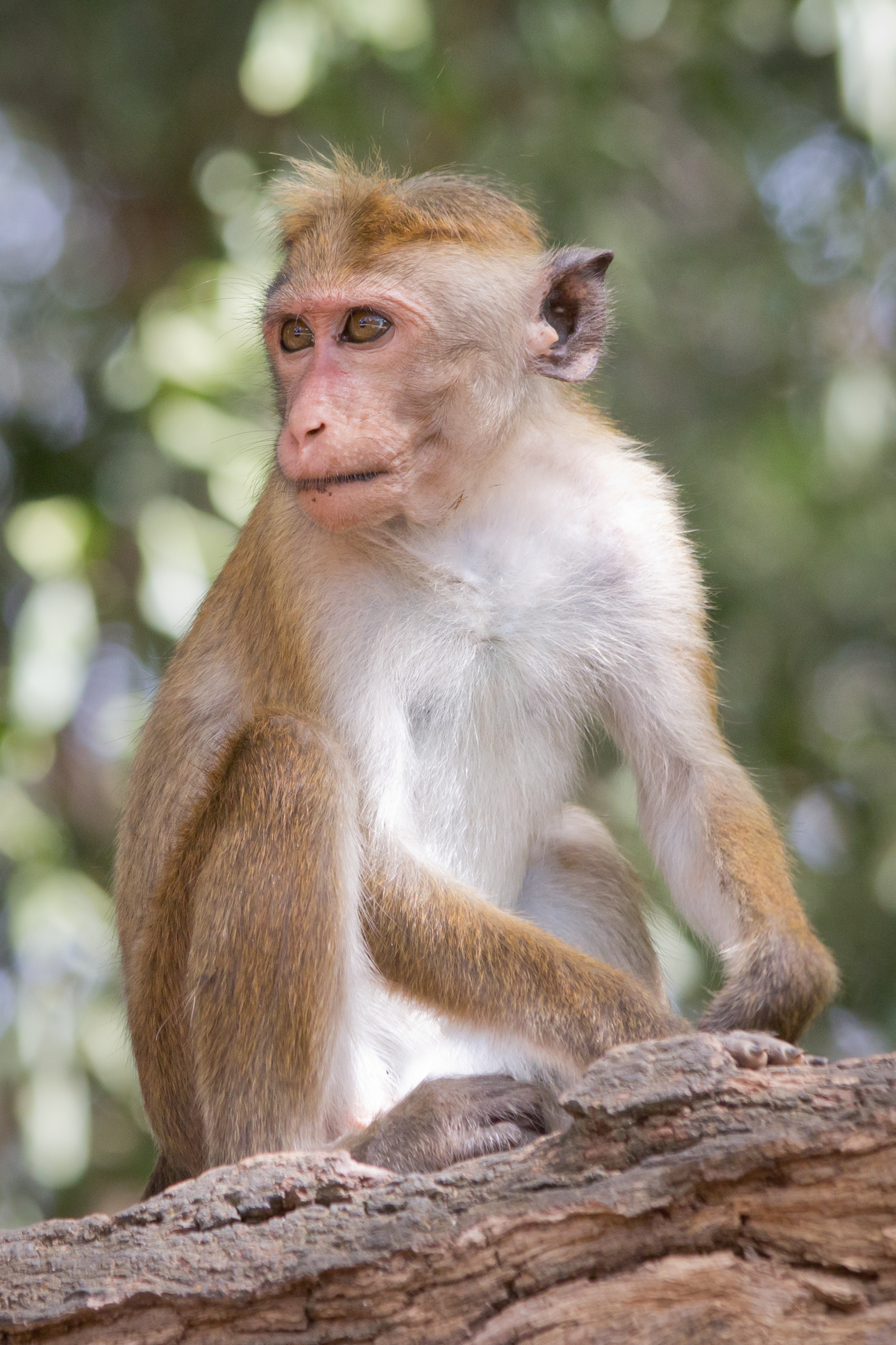
- At Yala National Park, Sri Lanka

Conservation status
- Endangered (IUCN 3.1)

Scientific classification
- Kingdom: Animalia
- Phylum: Chordata
- Class: Mammalia
- Order: Primates
- Family: Cercopithecidae
- Genus: Macaca
- Species: M. sinica

Binomial name
- Macaca sinica (Linnaeus, 1771)
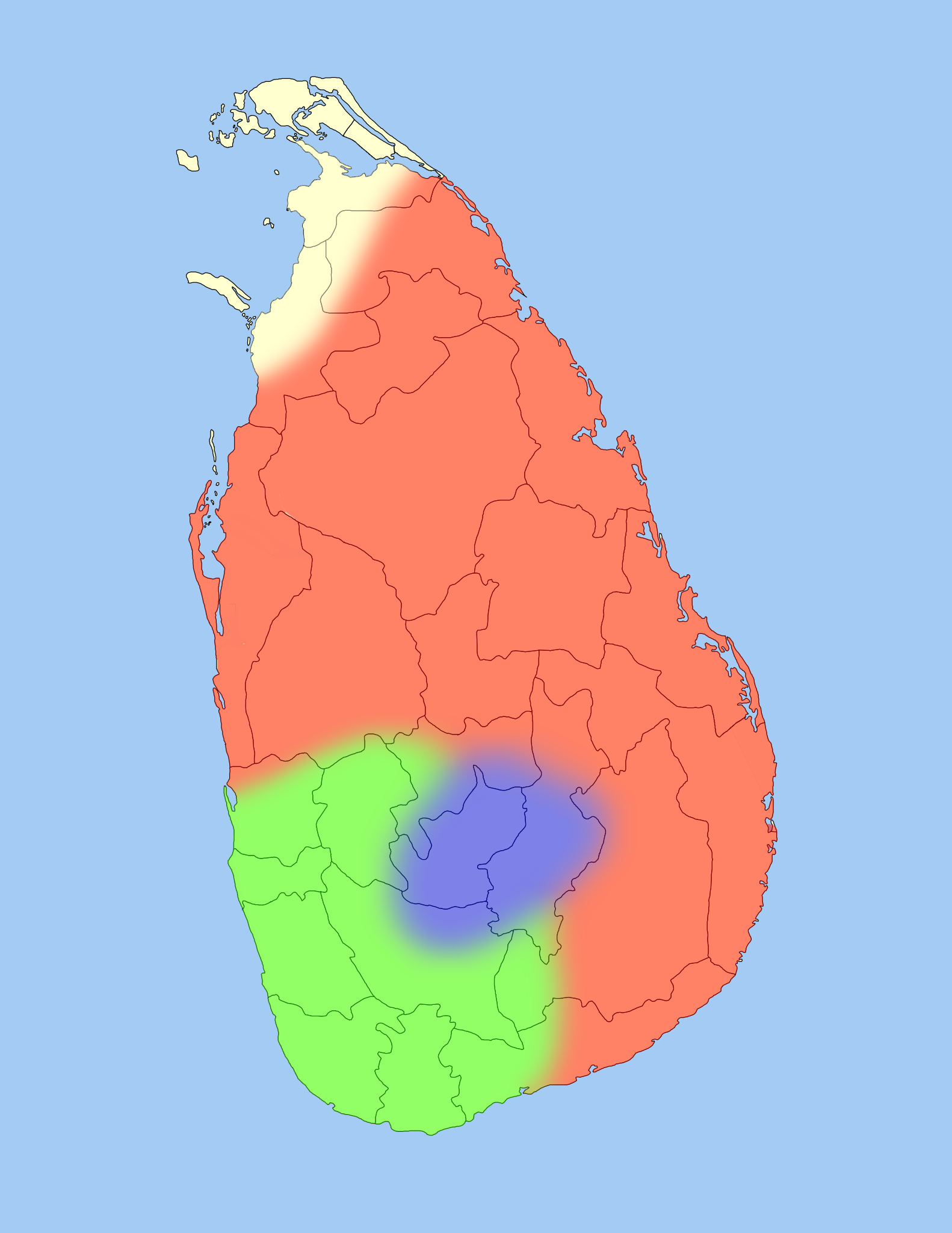
- Dry Zone Toque Macaque Wet Zone Toque Macaque Highland Toque Macaque

= Toque macaque =

Species of Old World monkey

3d model of skeleton

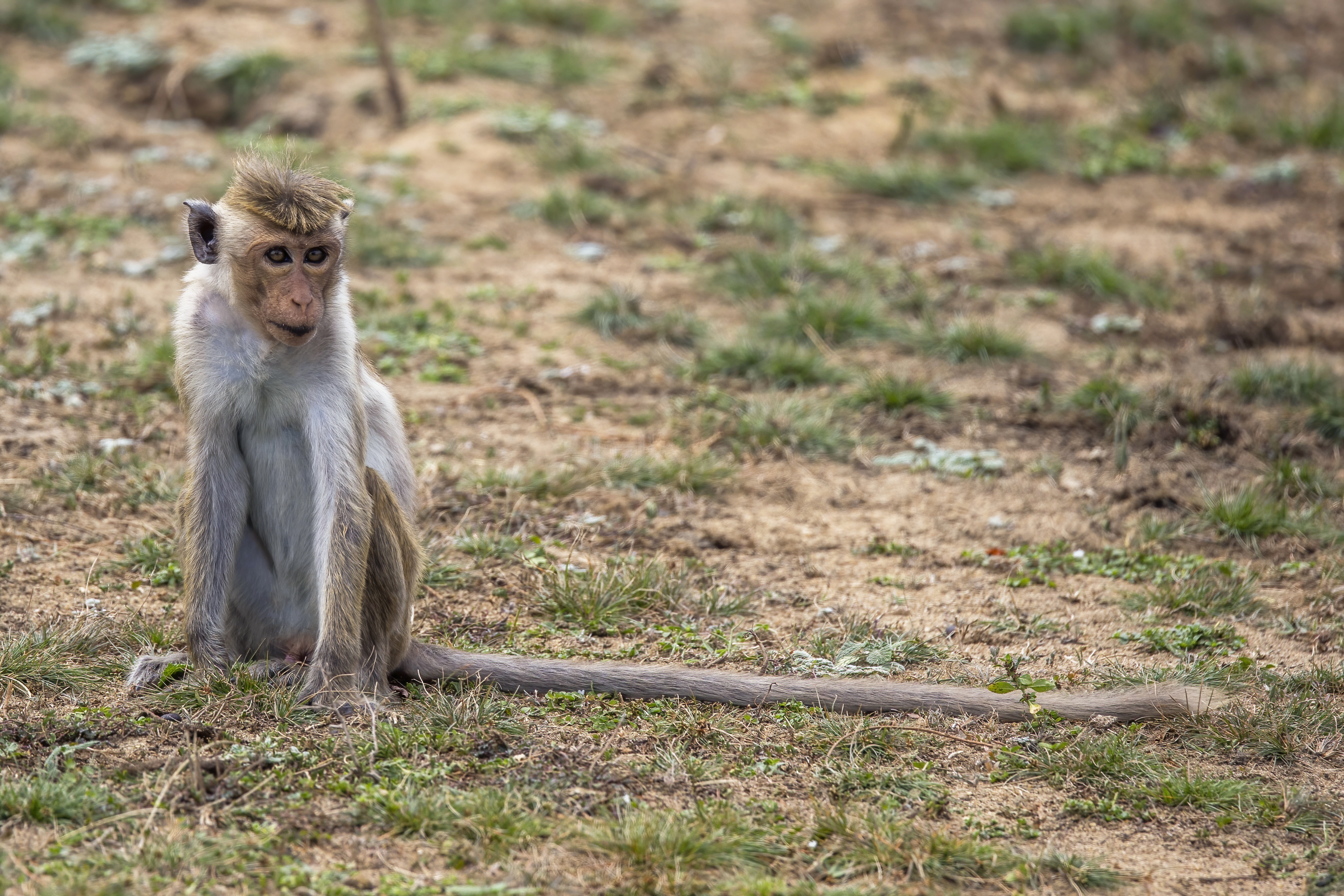
juvenile M. s. sinica

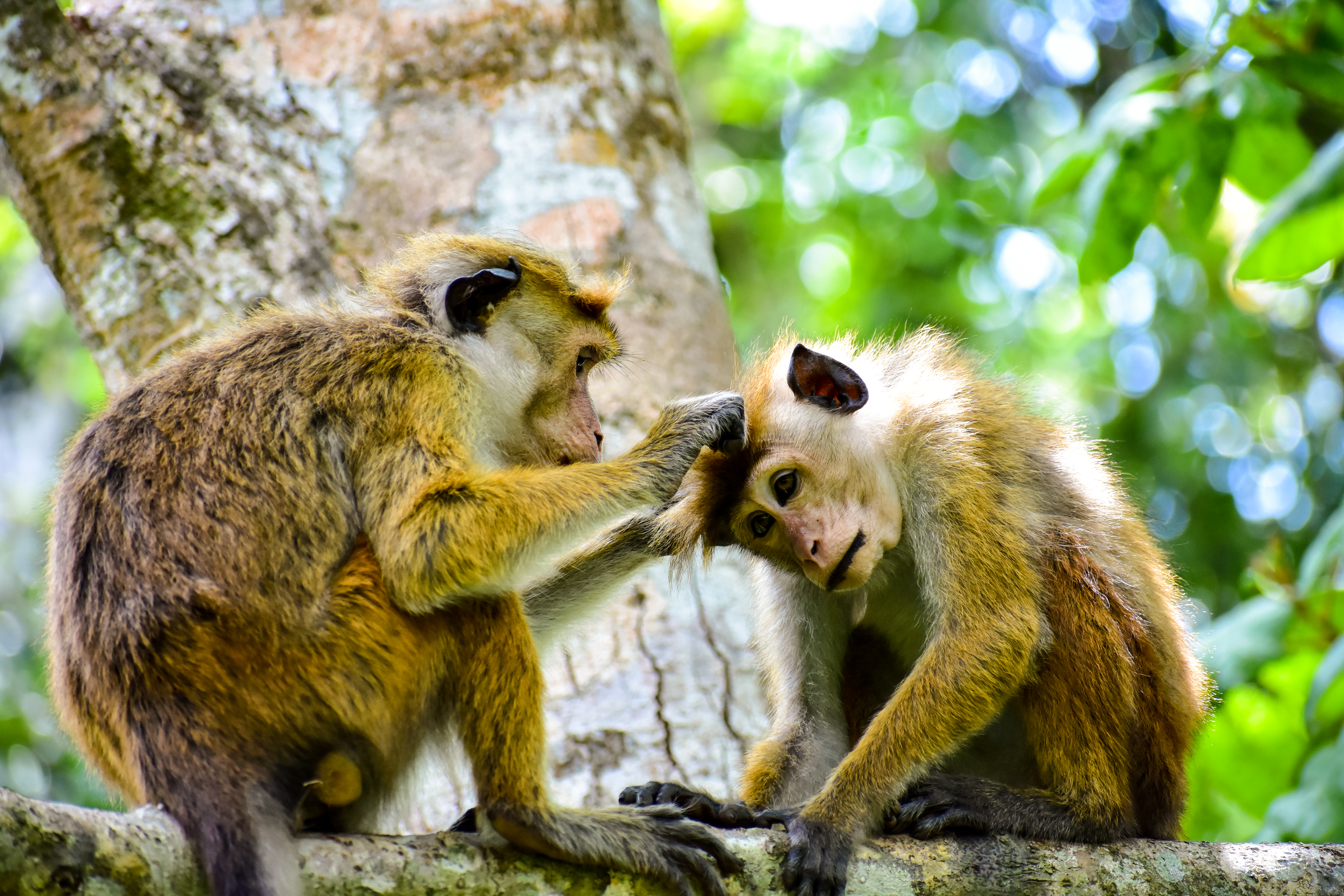
Allogrooming between two toque macaques

The toque macaque (/tɒk məˈkæk/; Macaca sinica) is a reddish-brown-coloured Old World monkey endemic to Sri Lanka, where it is known as the riḷawā (Sinhala: රිළවා), (hence the English word rillow). Its name refers to the whorl of hair at the crown of the head, reminiscent of a brimless toque cap.

== Taxonomy ==
The generic name Macaca is from Portuguese macaco, of unclear origin, while sinica means "of China," even though the species is not found there.

There are three recognized subspecies of toque macaques:

- Macaca sinica sinica, dry zone toque macaque or common toque macaque
- Macaca sinica aurifrons, wet zone toque macaque or pale-fronted toque macaque
- Macaca sinica opisthomelas, highland toque macaque or hill zone toque macaque

M. s. opisthomelas is similar to subsp. aurifrons, but has a long fur and contrasting golden color in the anterior part of its brown cap.

The three subspecies can be identified their head colour patterns.

== Description ==
With age, the face of females turns slightly pink. This is especially prominent in the subspecies M. s. sinica.

== Distribution ==
M. s. sinica is found from the Vavuniya, Mannar to the lowlands of Anuradhapura, Polonnaruwa, Puttalam, and Kurunegala; and along the arid zone of the Monaragala and Hambantota districts.

M. s. aurifrons can be found sympatrically with the subspecies M. s. sinica within intermediate regions of the country in Kegalle and parts of Kurunegala. It is also found in south-western parts of the island in the Galle and Matara districts near Kalu Ganga.

M. s. opisthomelas has recently been identified as a separate subspecies. It can be found in the entire south-western region of Ratnapura and in the Nuwara Eliya districts. It is also found around Hakgala Botanical Garden and other cold climatic montane forest patches.

== Behaviour and ecology ==
=== Social structure ===
Social status is highly structured in toque macaque troops and dominance hierarchies occur among both males and females. A troop may consist of eight to forty individuals. When the troop becomes too large, social tension and aggression towards each other rises, causing some individuals to leave. This is noticeable in adults and sub adults, where a troop may consist largely of females. Newly appointed alpha males show aggressiveness towards females, causing the females to leave the group. Fighting within the troop can cause serious injuries including broken arms.

Young offspring of a troop's alpha female will typically receive better sustenance and shelter than their peers.

=== Reproduction ===
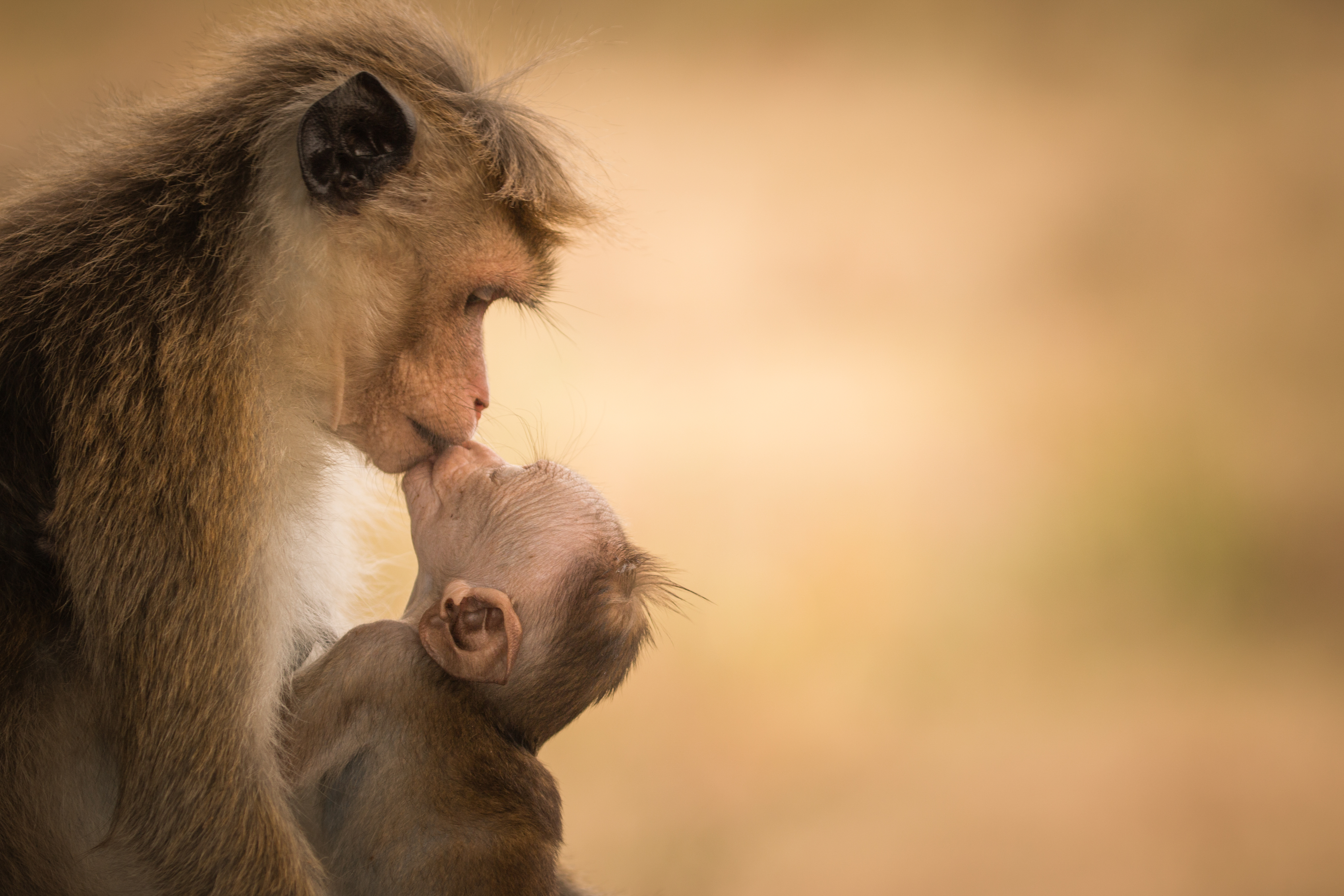
Female toque macaque with her baby in Katagamuwa sanctuary, Sri Lanka

When in estrous, the female's perineum becomes reddish in color and swells. This signals to males that she is ready to mate. There is an average of 18 months between births. After a 5–6 month gestation period, the female will give birth to a single offspring. The baby will hold on to its mother for about 2 months. During this time the infant learns social skills critical for survival. The infant will inherit its social standing from its mother's position in the troop. Young males are forced to abandon their troop when they are about 6–8 years of age. This prevents inbreeding and ensures that the current alpha male maintains his position in the troop. Leaving the troop is the only way a male can change his social standing. If he has good social skills and is strong he may become an alpha male. A single alpha male can father all of the troops' offspring.

Birth rarely occurs during the day or on the ground. During labor the female isolates herself from the group (about 100 m). The mother stands bipedally during parturition and assists the delivery with her hands. The infant is usually born 2 minutes after crowning. The infant can vocalize almost immediately after birth; it is important for the mother and infant to recognize each other's voices. Vocalization will be used to alert the mother of imminent danger, and can assist in finding each other if separated. After birth the mother licks the infant and orients it toward her breasts. She will resume foraging behavior within 20 minutes after parturition. The mother also eats part of the placenta, because it contains needed protein. The alpha female of the group asserts her power by taking part of the placenta for herself to eat.

=== Diet ===
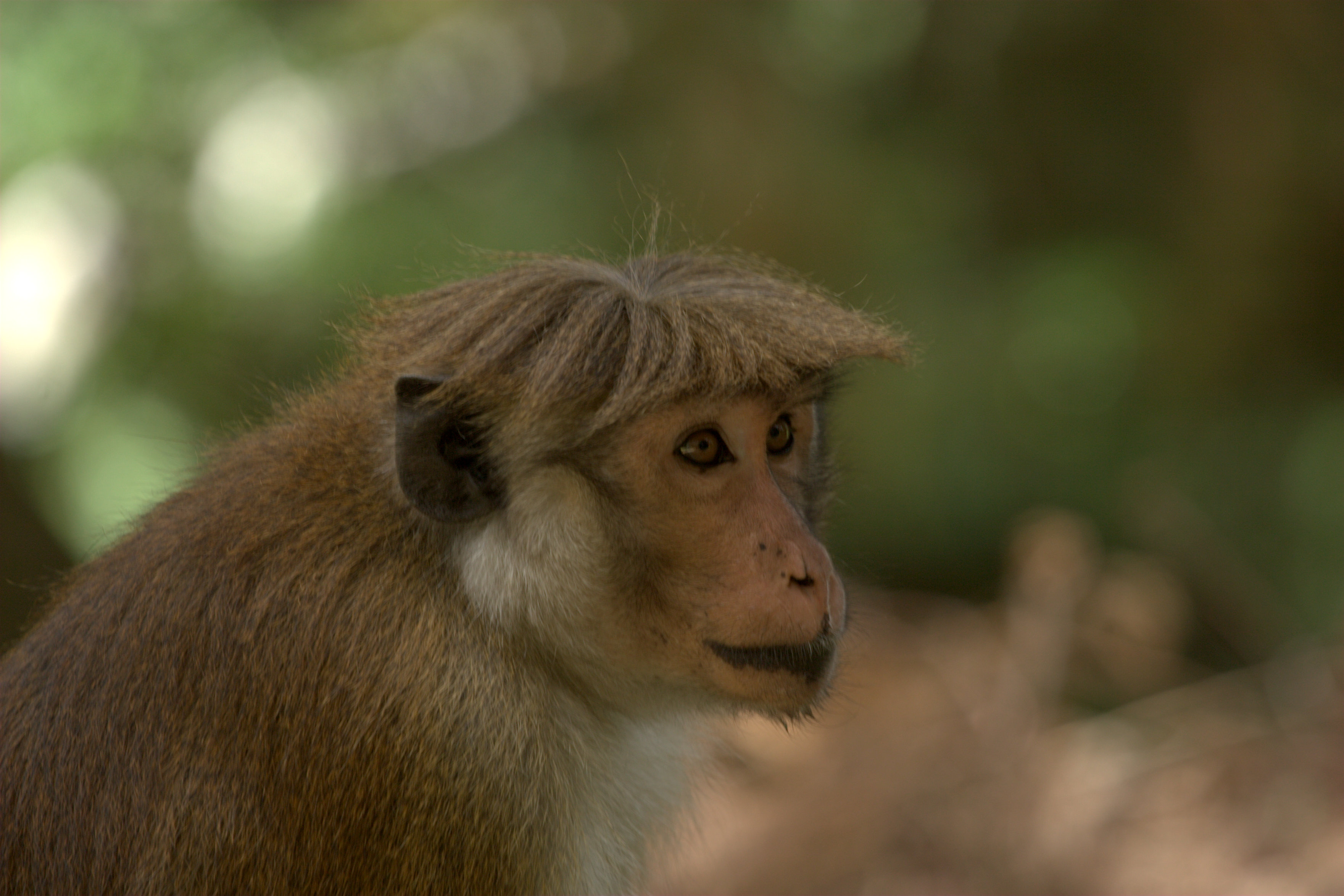
Macaca sinica opisthomelas

One study of toque macaques recorded a diet of 14% flowers, 77% fruits, 5% mushrooms, and 4% prey items. The preferred fruit species included Ficus bengalensis, Glenniea unijuga, Schleichera oleosa, Drypetes sepiaria, Grewia polygama, Ficus amplissima, and Ficus retusa. It was found that mushrooms were much sought after during the wet season.

Cheek pouches enable toque macaques to store food while eating fast. In the dry zone, they are known to eat drupes of the understory shrub Zizyphus and ripe fruits of Ficus, and Cordia species. They occasionally eat small animals ranging from small insects to mammals like the Indian palm squirrel and the Asiatic long-tailed climbing mouse.

=== Predators ===
Leopards and Indian rock pythons are the main predators of this species.

Suspected or confirmed predators of toque macaques include forest eagle owls, grey-headed fish eagles, white-bellied sea eagles, and Brahminy kites.

== Conservation ==
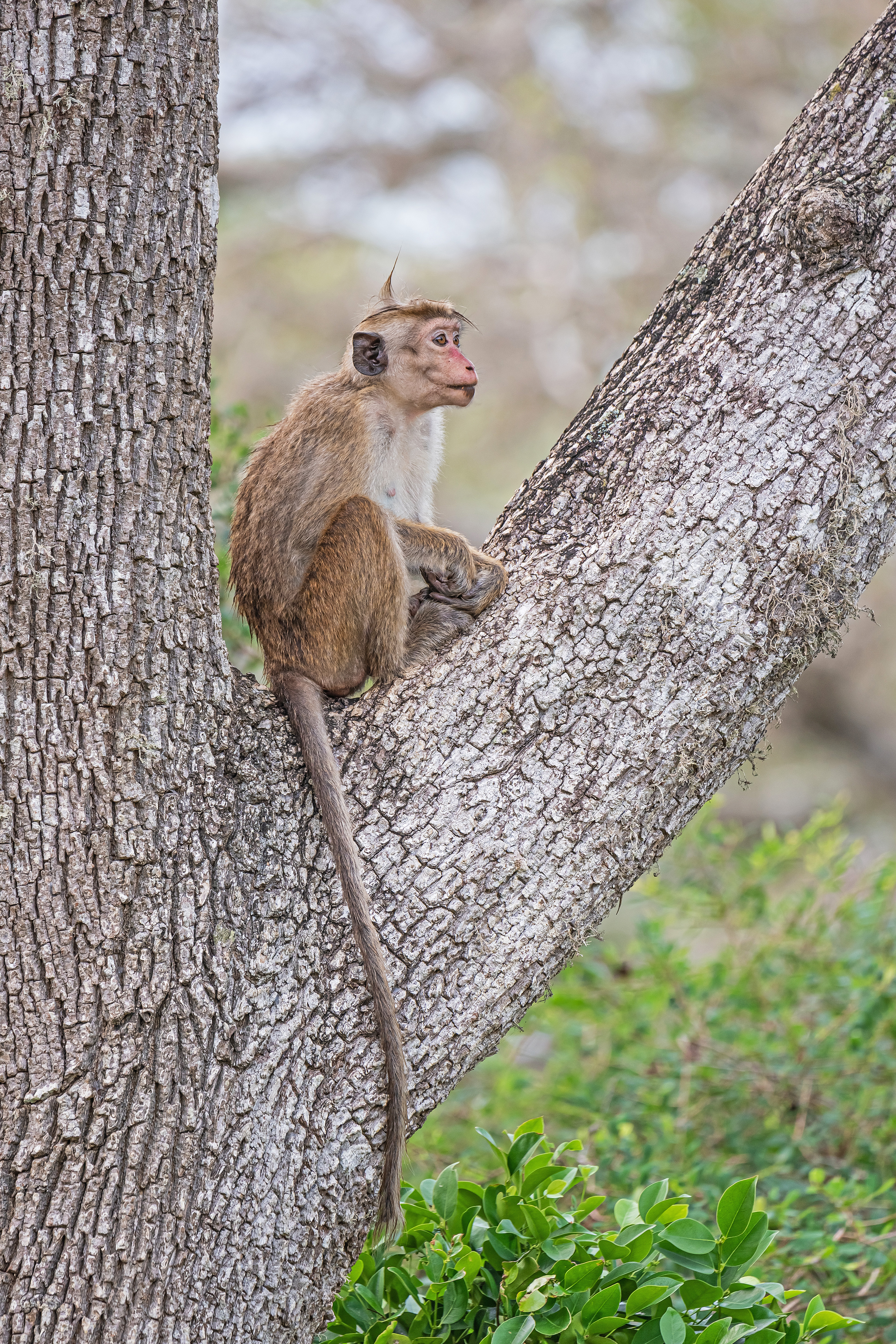
Macaca sinica in the Bundala National Park, Sri Lanka

The toque macaque is listed as Endangered by the International Union for the Conservation of Nature (IUCN) due to habitat destruction and hunting, and also for the pet trade. Much of the original forested habitat of the toque macaque has been lost: Between 1956 and 1993 50% of Sri Lanka’s forest cover was destroyed. Plantations and fuel wood collection have been the main drivers of habitat lost.

Pushed out of forest habitat, toque macaques are considered a “menace” by farmers. They were used by both Sri Lanka Army and Tamil Tigers as target practice during the Sri Lankan Civil War. The Sri Lankan government proposed exporting 100,000 monkeys to China but scrapped the effort after conservationists and zoologists protested. In 2023, the government issued shotguns to farmers to stop the monkeys from raiding their crops and, when that failed to have an impact, began experimenting with implanting IUDs in females to stop them from reproducing.

Both subspecies M. s. aurifrons and M. s. sinica are kept as pets.
