= Crocidura hikmiya =

Conservation status
- Endangered (IUCN 3.1)

Scientific classification
- Kingdom: Animalia
- Phylum: Chordata
- Class: Mammalia
- Order: Eulipotyphla
- Family: Soricidae
- Genus: Crocidura
- Species: C. hikmiya

Binomial name
- Crocidura hikmiya Meegaskumbura, Meegaskumbura, Manamendra-Arachchi, Pethiyagoda & Schneider, 2007
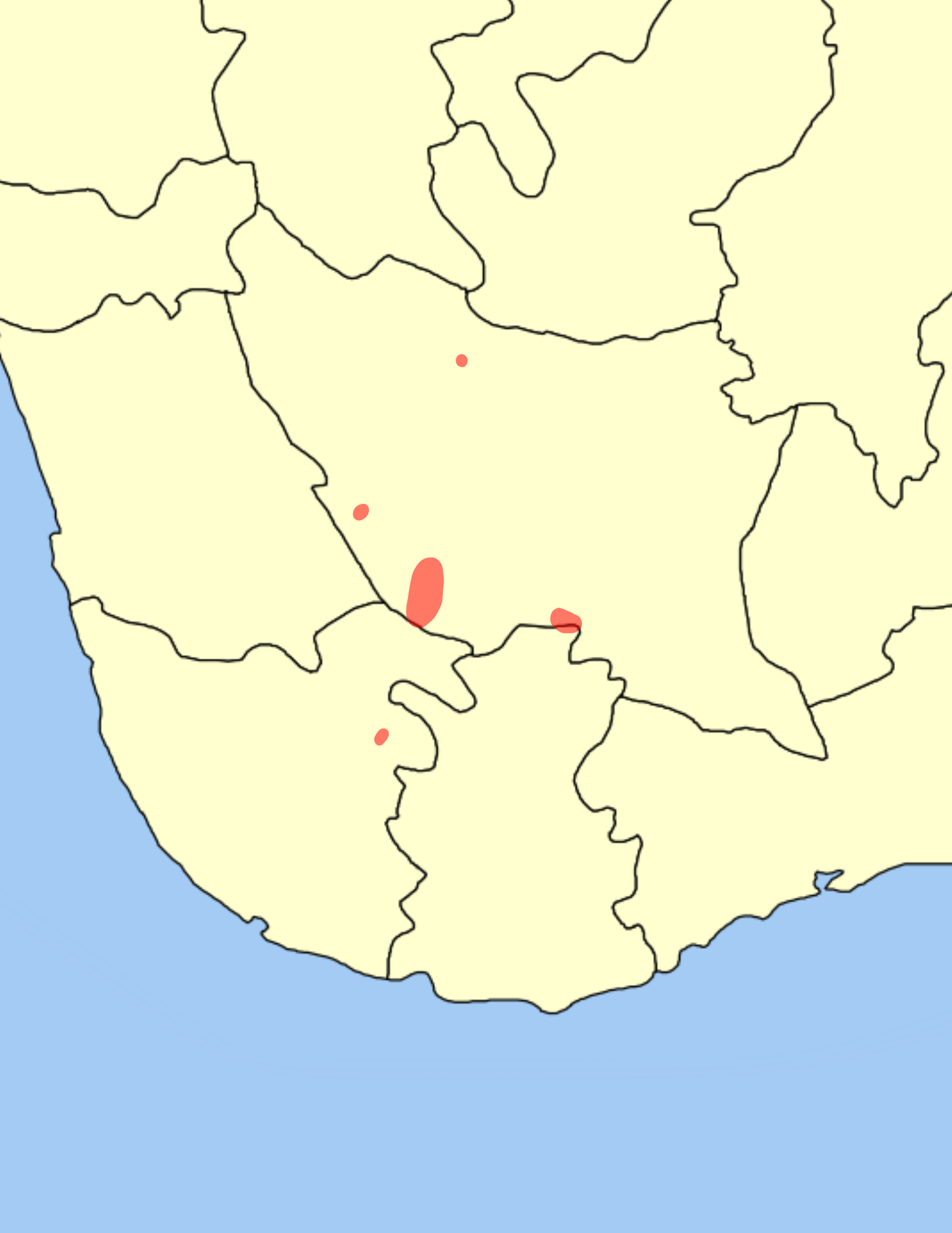
- Crocidura hikmiya range

Species of mammal

Crocidura hikmiya (Sinharaja white-toothed shrew, Sinharaja Shrew or Sri Lankan rain forest shrew) is a species of shrew described from the rainforests of Sri Lanka, based on both morphological and molecular data. Its closest sister species is the Sri Lankan long-tailed shrew, another Sri Lankan crocidurine shrew restricted to the high-elevation habitats of the Central Highlands. C. hikmiya has a shorter tail than the Sri Lankan long-tailed shrew. Most of the other characteristics that distinguish the two species are osteological natured .

== Etymology ==
The specific epithet hikmiya is Sinhala for 'shrew', applied here as a substantive in apposition. It is known as ශ්‍රී ලංකා සිංහරාජ කුනු හික් මීයා in Sinhala.

== Distribution ==
Crocidura hikmiya is endemic to southern Sri Lanka and is known from only a few localities. Its distribution is primarily within the wet zone forests.

The species was first described from the Sinharaja Forest Reserve, where it has been recorded at two distinct areas: the Kudawa sector (460 m above sea level) and the Morningside estate (1,040 m above sea level). Subsequent records have also located the species further north, near the Peak Wilderness Sanctuary, and to the south, in the Kanneliya Forest Reserve.

Despite this scattered distribution, the species has a very limited range. Three of the known sites : Kudawa, Morningside, and another nearby location are clustered within the Sinharaja Forest Reserve, making them potentially vulnerable to a single widespread threat. When considering these clustered sites as one, the species is estimated to occur at only three distinct locations.

== Habitat ==
Within Sinharaja, this species has been recorded in recently regenerated secondary forest, which grew back after logging operations in the 1970s. However, it is possible that individuals previously identified as Sri Lankan Long-tailed Shrew from unlogged forest in Sinharaja might have been the Sinharaja Shrew. The species inhabits different forest types; the Kudawa site is characterized as a Mesua–Doona community (a type of mixed dipterocarp forest), while the Morningside site features forest transitional between lowland wet-evergreen and tropical montane forest. This ecological separation suggests that this species may be more widespread throughout the Sinharaja Forest Reserve than current records indicate.
