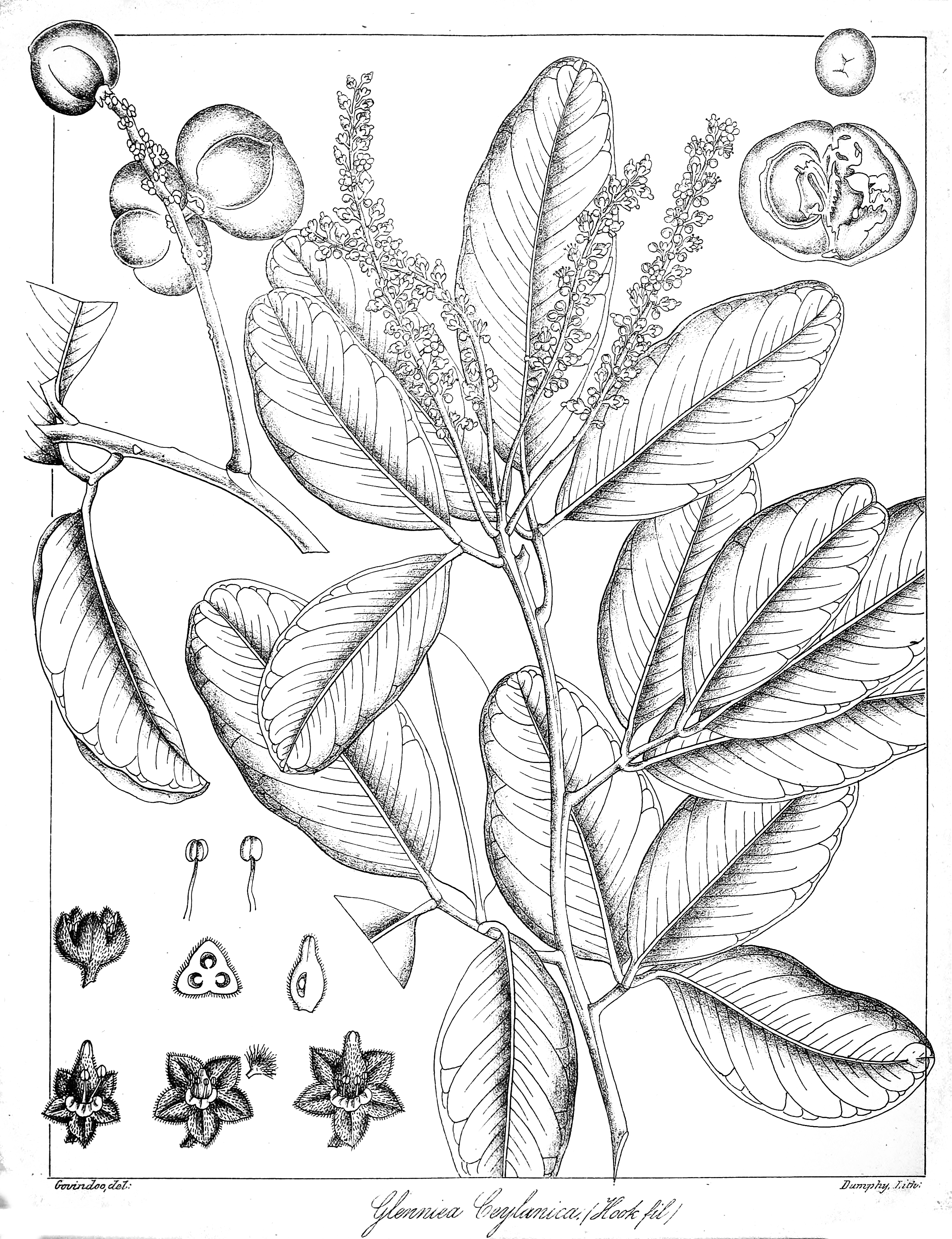
- Glenniea unijuga

Scientific classification
- Kingdom: Plantae
- Clade: Tracheophytes
- Clade: Angiosperms
- Clade: Eudicots
- Clade: Rosids
- Order: Sapindales
- Family: Sapindaceae
- Subfamily: Sapindoideae
- Tribe: Nephelieae
- Genus: Glenniea; Hook.f.

Synonyms
- Cnemidiscus Pierre; Crossonephelis Baill.; Hedyachras Radlk.; Melanodiscus Radlk.

= Glenniea =

Genus of flowering plants

Glenniea is a genus of plant in the family Sapindaceae. It includes eight species native to tropical Africa, Sri Lanka, southeast Asia, and New Guinea.

== Species ==
Plants of the World Online currently includes:

- Glenniea adami (Fouilloy) Leenh.
- Glenniea africana (Radlk.) Leenh.
- Glenniea penangensis (Ridl.) Leenh.
- Glenniea pervillei (Baill.) Leenh.
- Glenniea philippinensis (Radlk.) Leenh.
- Glenniea thorelii (Pierre) Leenh.
- Glenniea unijuga (Thwaites) Radlk.
- Glenniea unijugata (Aubrév. & Pellegr.) Leenh.
