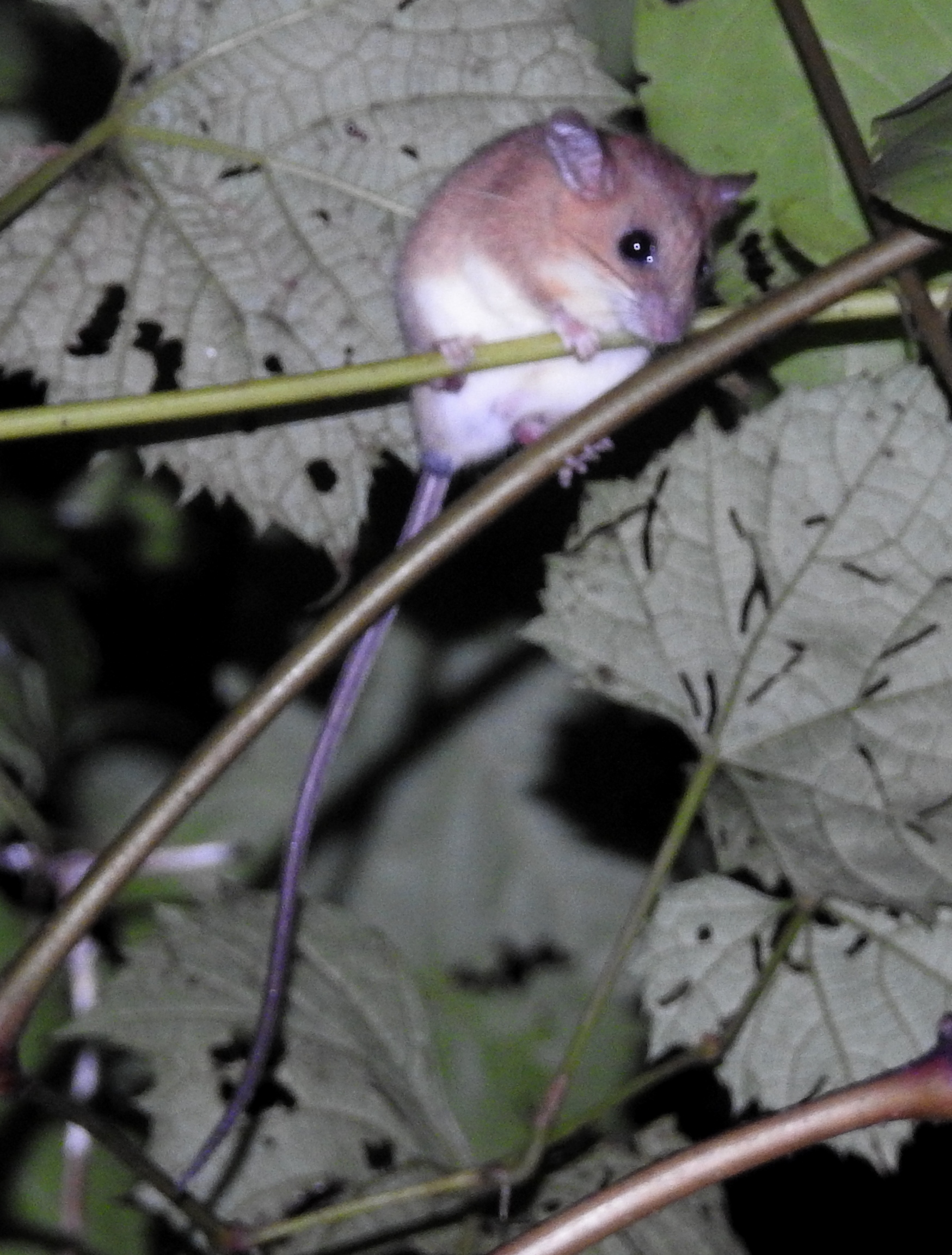

Conservation status
- Least Concern (IUCN 3.1)

Scientific classification
- Kingdom: Animalia
- Phylum: Chordata
- Class: Mammalia
- Order: Rodentia
- Family: Muridae
- Genus: Vandeleuria
- Species: V. oleracea

Binomial name
- Vandeleuria oleracea (Bennett, 1832)
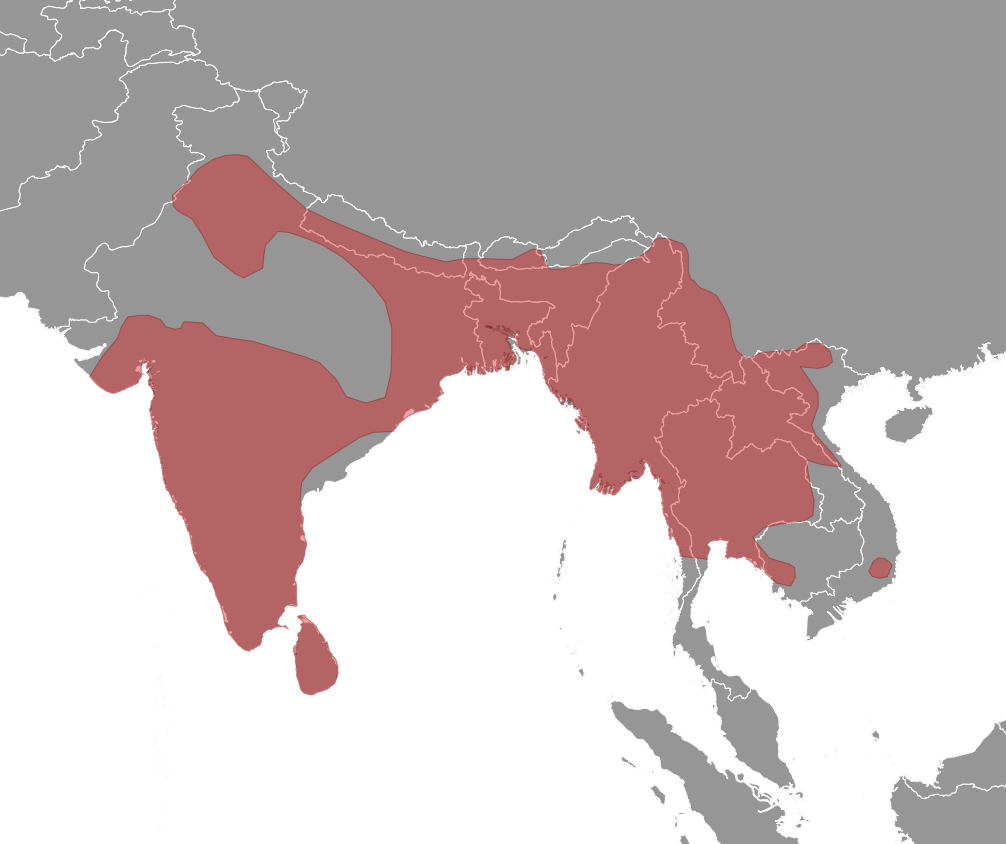

Synonyms
- Vandeleuria badius (Blyth, 1859); Vandeleuria domecolus (Hodgson, 1841); Vandeleuria dumeticola (Hodgson, 1845); Vandeleuria marica (Thomas, 1915); Vandeleuria modesta (Thomas, 1914); Vandeleuria povensis (Hodgson, 1845); Vandeleuria rubida (Thomas, 1914); Vandeleuria sibylla (Thomas, 1914); Vandeleuria scandens (Osgood, 1932); Vandeleuria spadicea (Ryley, 1914); Vandeleuria wroughtoni (Ryley, 1914)

= Asiatic long-tailed climbing mouse =

Species of rodent

The Asiatic long-tailed climbing mouse (Vandeleuria oleracea) is a species of rodent found in South and Southeast Asia. It is known as Sinhala: ගස් මීයා by Sinhalese people.

Vandeleuria oleracea has a lifespan of 2 years. They have a body length that is between 7–9 cm and has different colored upper and underparts. The species is within the Muridae family, which includes close relatives like the Vandeleuria nilagirica. They are found within terrestrial habitats in Asia. Along with this, they are able to secrete and carry two different viruses, Xenotropic Type C Virus and Kyasanur Forest Disease. Their overall conservation status is least concerned.

== Description ==
Head and body length is 7–9 cm. Tail is 10–12 cm. Reddish brown upperparts grading on the sides to light yellowish brown. Underparts are light brownish white. Long tail is dark, and slender with no tuft at tip. Largish hind feet with nails instead of claws on the outer toes, which are opposable. They are called a climbing mouse because they climb many different plants, such as cane grass.

== Taxonomy ==
V. oleracea is a part of the order Rodentia and the family Muridae. From the Muridae, specifically in the South-East Asian arboreal murine rodents, the following tribes are the closest relatives as listed below:

· Acomys

· Apodemus

· Bandicota

· Berylmys

· Chiropodomys

· Cremnomys

· Dacnomys

· Diomys

· Golunda

· Hadromys

· Leopoldamys

· Micromys

· Millardia

· Mus

· Nesokia

· Niviventer

· Rattus

· Srilankamys

In the genus Vandeleuria, the closest relatives to this species are Vandeleuria nolthenii and Vandeleuria nilagirica.

== Habitat and Distribution ==
The Asiatic long-tailed climbing mouse lives in a terrestrial habitat, such as forests, shrubland, and grasslands. The species are found in Bangladesh, Bhutan, Cambodia, China, India, Myanmar, Nepal, Sri Lanka, Thailand, and Vietnam. They are typically found in elevations between 200 meters to 1,500 meters.

A field study report showed that the species's distribution started from Kamrup, India in 1961 and is now in Rongtara, India, which is about 215 kilometers apart. The report concluded that there needs to be more studies done to understand the phylogenetic changes the species acquired and the habitat.

== Xenotropic Type C Virus ==
A 1978 study showed that the V. oleracea was able to release a xenotropic type C virus that is similar to the murine type C-I class of endogenous retroviruses. The virus was able to grow on non-rodent tissue cultures, such as primates. From the results, it is suggested that the V. oleracea may contribute to horizontal transmission of the type C viruses, which are found in gibbon populations. Also, viral sequences show that the C-I class of endogenous retroviruses are highly conserved and have evolved to what V. oleracea is able to release.

== Kyasanur Forest Disease ==
The Asiatic long-tailed climbing mouse is known to spread the Ixodes tick-borne viral Kyasanur Forest Disease (KFD). Kyasanur Forest Disease is from India, which is where the species is from. There have been studies suggesting that the disease evolved when distributed across Asian and European forests as well as having the possibility of spreading based on the movement and ecological changes from the area.

In a study, V. oleracea contracted the disease and showed a peak of viremia within two to five days. The disease was present in the brain, kidney, liver, spleen, and lung tissues during viremia. Some cases showed that the virus was mostly in the brain and kidney tissues. After the experiments, the researchers gave the species a serum, which neutralized the KFD virus.

== Conservation Status and Threats ==
There is habitat loss and degradation from multiple things, such as agriculture, human encroachment, and grazing by livestock. The conservation status for the species is labeled as "Least Concerned" from the IUCN reports. The last assessment that was conducted for the Asiatic long-tailed climbing mouse was on October 11, 2016.
