= Alsophila sinuata =

- In Sinharaja Forest Reserve

Scientific classification
- Kingdom: Plantae
- Clade: Tracheophytes
- Division: Polypodiophyta
- Class: Polypodiopsida
- Order: Cyatheales
- Family: Cyatheaceae
- Genus: Alsophila
- Species: A. sinuata

Binomial name
- Alsophila sinuata (Hook. & Grev.) R.M.Tryon

Synonyms
- Cyathea sinuata Hook. & Grev.; Schizocaena sinuata (Hook. & Grev.) J.Sm.

Species of fern

Alsophila sinuata, synonym Cyathea sinuata, is unique among the tree ferns in that it has entire leaves, not pinnate or lobed. It is native to Sri Lanka but rare.This species was recorded previously only from three southern lowland rainforest areas, Sinharaja world heritage site, Kanneliya forest reserve and Beraliya proposed forest reserve.The present survey records Alsophila sinuata from fragmented forests in the south-west of the country as a few isolated patches in the Hiniduma forest reserve and Runakanda forest reserve. It is one of the smallest species of tree ferns, growing only about one meter (3.3 feet) tall, with fronds 60 to 90 centimeters (15 to 23 inches) long.

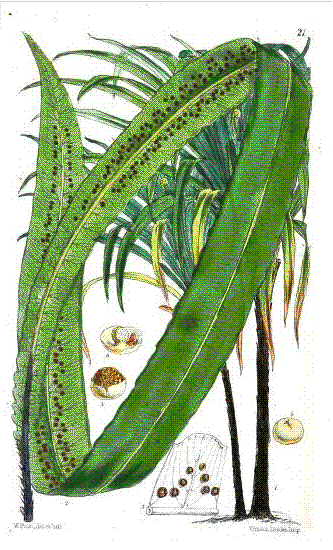
Drawing by Walter Fitch
