= Glenniea penangensis =

Conservation status
- Vulnerable (IUCN 2.3)

Scientific classification
- Kingdom: Plantae
- Clade: Tracheophytes
- Clade: Angiosperms
- Clade: Eudicots
- Clade: Rosids
- Order: Sapindales
- Family: Sapindaceae
- Genus: Glenniea
- Species: G. penangensis

Binomial name
- Glenniea penangensis (Ridl.) Leenhouts

Species of tree

Glenniea penangensis is a species of plant in the family Sapindaceae. It is a tree endemic to Peninsular Malaysia, but it is threatened by habitat loss.
