= Bhagya Abeyratne =

Sri Lankan environmental activist

- භාග්‍යා අබේරත්න
- Born: c. 2002
- Known for: Environmental activism

Bhagya Abeyratne (Sinhala: භාග්‍යා අබේරත්න; born c. 2002), also known as Bhagya Abeyrathna, is a Sri Lankan environmental activist from Kajugaswatta, Sabaragamuwa Province. In March 2021, Abeyratne received wide media attention for exposing the deforestation of the Sinharaja Forest Reserve.

== Biography ==
Abeyratne was born c. 2002, and attended Rahula National School. In 2020, Abeyratne completed her Advanced Level examinations.

In March 2021, Abeyratne took part in the reality television show Lakshapathi in which she made revelations about the deforestation of the Sinharaja forest. She said that the environment surrounding the Sinharaja forest has been subjected to deforestation. Her comments regarding Sinharaja were scrutizined by the relevant authorities, with her residence being raided by police officers to record statements of her remarks. The government officials denied the allegations made by Abeyratne and also threatened her to not get involved without knowing the facts.

She became a talking point on social media and was compared to Swedish environmental activist Greta Thunberg. Several activists urged the government to stop the investigation and the harassment of Abeyratne.
