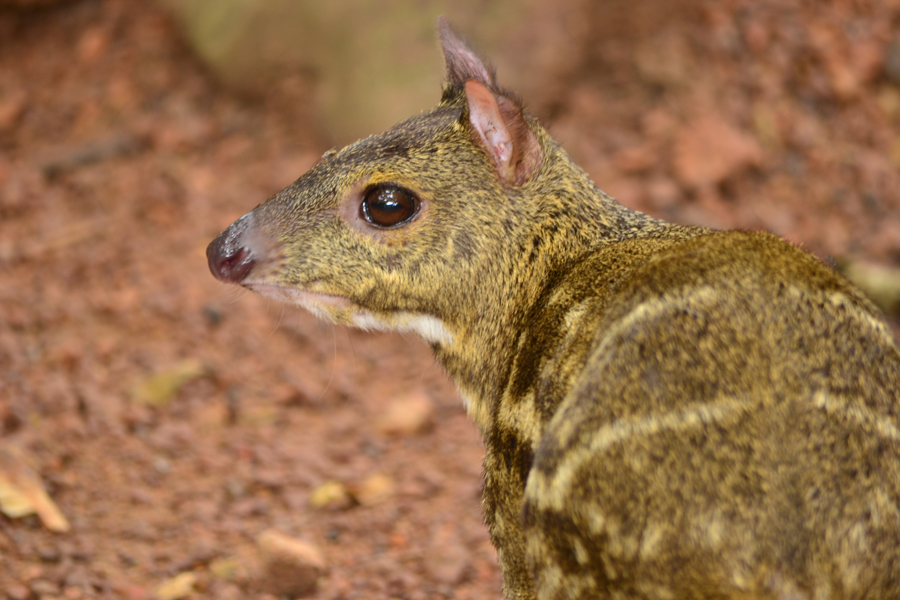

Conservation status
- Least Concern (IUCN 3.1)

Scientific classification
- Kingdom: Animalia
- Phylum: Chordata
- Class: Mammalia
- Order: Artiodactyla
- Family: Tragulidae
- Genus: Moschiola
- Species: M. kathygre

Binomial name
- Moschiola kathygre Groves & Meijaard, 2005
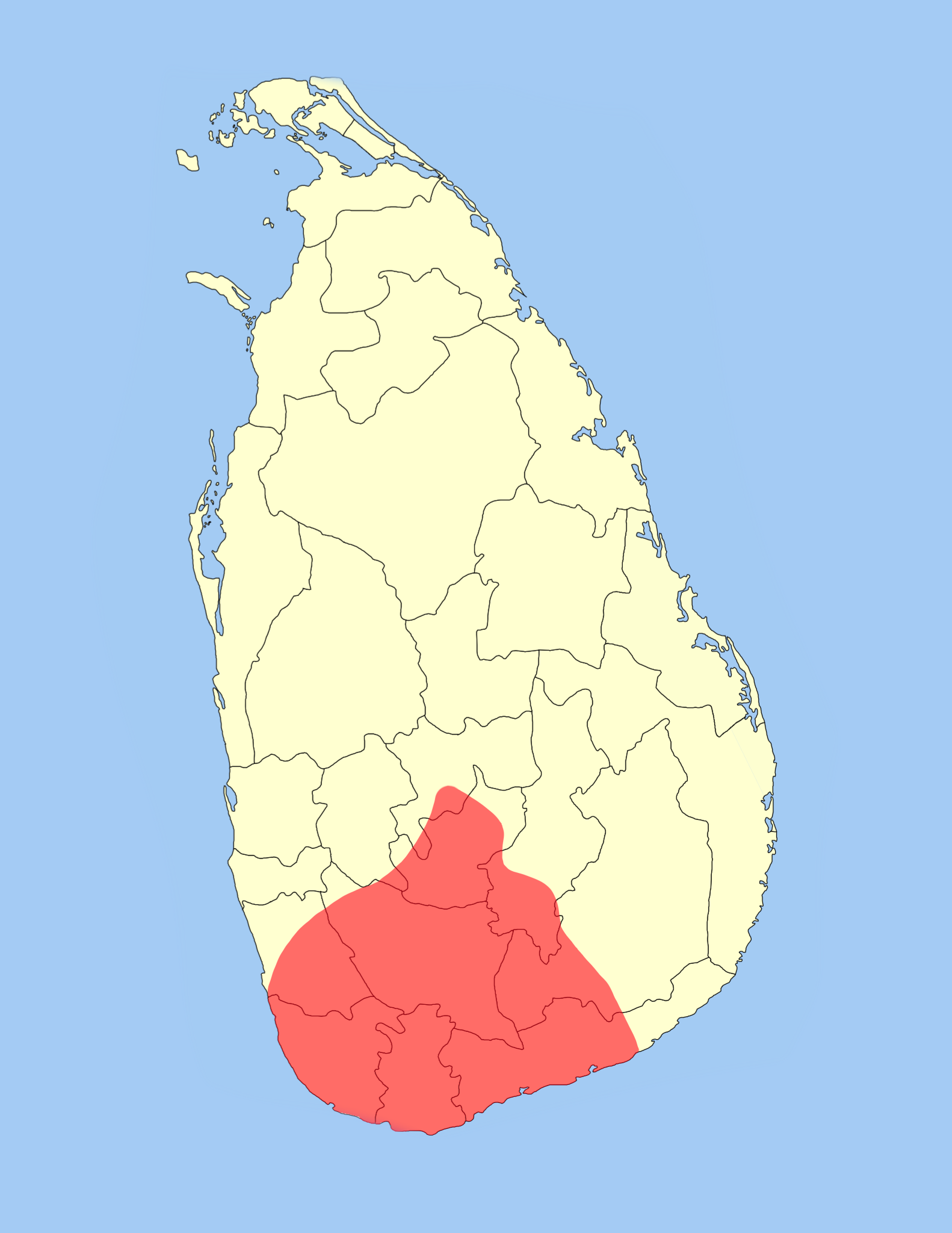
- Yellow-striped chevrotain range map

= Yellow-striped chevrotain =

Species of mammal

The yellow-striped chevrotain (Moschiola kathygre) is a species of chevrotain described in 2005. It is found in the wet zones of Sri Lanka. It was recognized as a species distinct from Moschiola meminna based on the phylogenetic species concept.

== Description ==
Head and body length in the species is typically 43–51 cm (17–20 in). Dorsally, it is a warm yellowish brown in color with at least two light yellow stripes longitudinally along flanks separated by a row of light yellow spots. Two distinct stripes along back plus another below the tail, all are pale yellow in color. Fur is fine and coarse. Tusk-like upper canines are visible in males.

== Distribution ==
The yellow-striped chevrotain is endemic to the Wet Zone of Sri Lanka. Its range extends from the Sinharaja Forest in the south, through the lowlands around Colombo, and north to Katagamuwa on the border of the Dry Zone. It also occurs in the highlands, at least as far as the Kandy District.

== Habitat ==
This species is primarily restricted to wet forests but demonstrates considerable adaptability to human-modified landscapes. It is known to freely enter rice paddies and is more abundant in secondary forest than in primary forest. It also occurs commonly in rubber plantations and home gardens. While riverine forests in the intermediate zone are known to support other Wet Zone endemics, it is unclear if the yellow-striped chevrotain utilizes these habitats.
