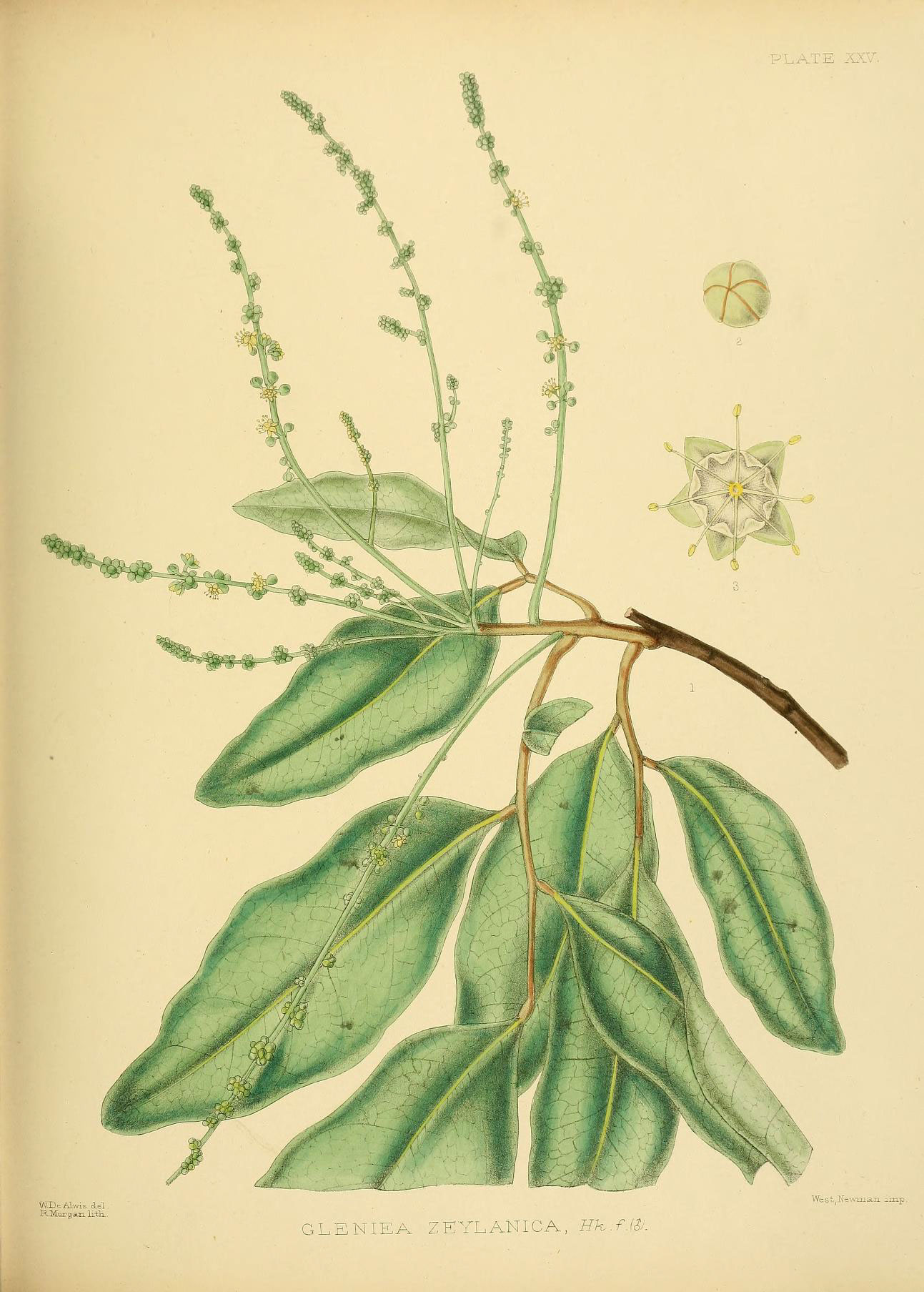

Conservation status
- Vulnerable (IUCN 2.3)

Scientific classification
- Kingdom: Plantae
- Clade: Tracheophytes
- Clade: Angiosperms
- Clade: Eudicots
- Clade: Rosids
- Order: Sapindales
- Family: Sapindaceae
- Genus: Glenniea
- Species: G. unijuga

Binomial name
- Glenniea unijuga (Thwaites) Radlk.

= Glenniea unijuga =

Species of flowering plant

Glenniea unijuga is a species of plant in the family Sapindaceae. It is endemic to Sri Lanka.

== Culture ==
Known as "වල් මොර - wal mora" in Sinhala.
