= Sri Lankan shrew =

Conservation status
- Endangered (IUCN 3.1)

Scientific classification
- Kingdom: Animalia
- Phylum: Chordata
- Class: Mammalia
- Order: Eulipotyphla
- Family: Soricidae
- Genus: Suncus
- Species: S. fellowesgordoni

Binomial name
- Suncus fellowesgordoni Phillips, 1932
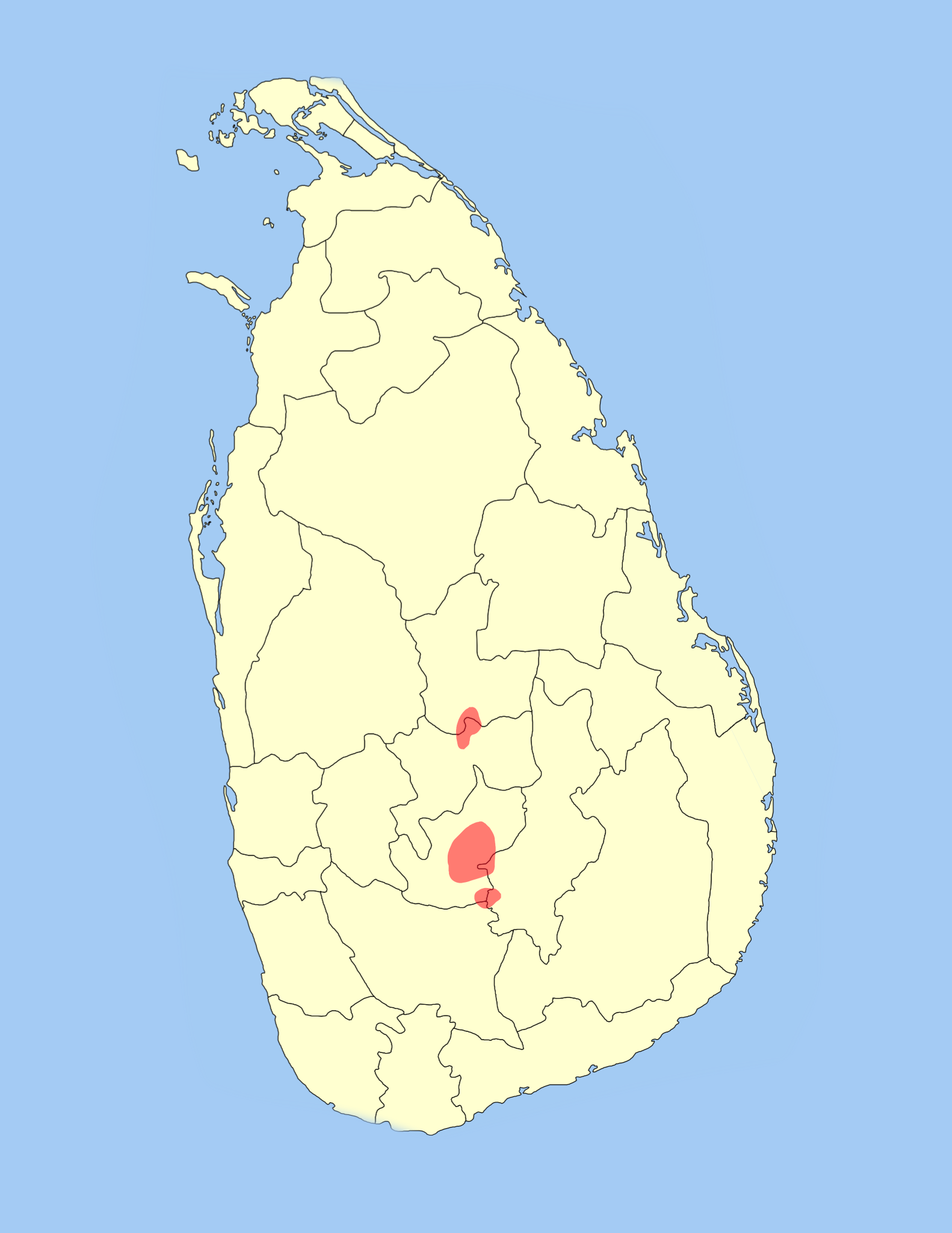
- Sri Lankan shrew range

Species of mammal

The Sri Lankan shrew (Suncus fellowesgordoni), also called Gordon's pygmy shrew, is a species of mammal in the family Soricidae. It is endemic to Sri Lanka. It is threatened by habitat loss. It is known as හික් මීයා ([hikmiːya]) in Sinhala. It was named after the wife of A. C. Tutein-Nolthenius, Marjory née Fellowes-Gordon, who collected specimens of the shrew and provided them to Phillips.

== Description ==
Sri Lankan shrews have a head and body length of 5–6 cm (2.0–2.4 in) with a tail 3 cm (1.2 in) long. Females are larger than males. They are dark chocolate brown to blackish brown above and dark gray with a silver sheen below. The throat is very gray in color, while the snout, ears, and forefeet are pink and the claws reddish brown. The tail has gray hairs that are dark above and light below.

== Distribution ==
This shrew is endemic to the Central Highlands of Sri Lanka. It was historically known from a limited range, but its distribution was extended further south to Agarapatana. It occurs at elevations between 1,100 and 2,500 meters.

== Ecology ==
The species is nocturnal and terrestrial. Its habitat consists of montane forests and the wet Patana grasslands found within this ecoregion.
