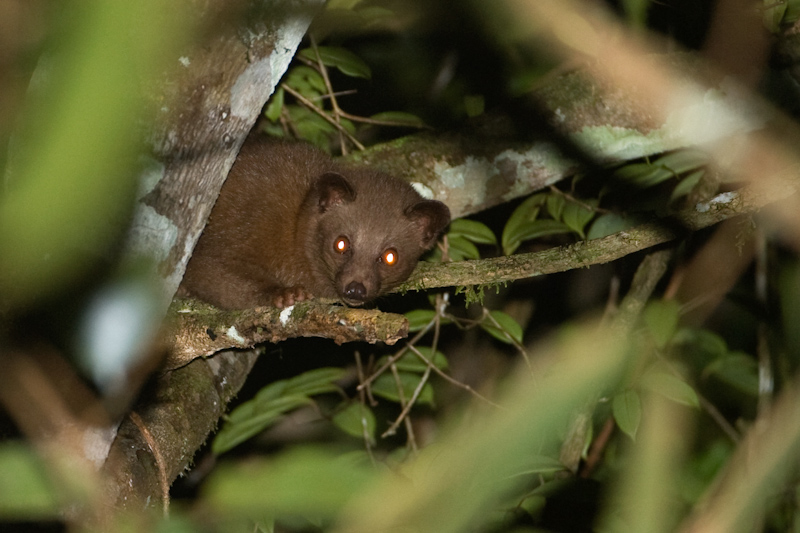

Conservation status
- Least Concern (IUCN 3.1)

Scientific classification
- Kingdom: Animalia
- Phylum: Chordata
- Class: Mammalia
- Order: Carnivora
- Family: Viverridae
- Genus: Paradoxurus
- Species: P. zeylonensis

Binomial name
- Paradoxurus zeylonensis (Pallas, 1778)
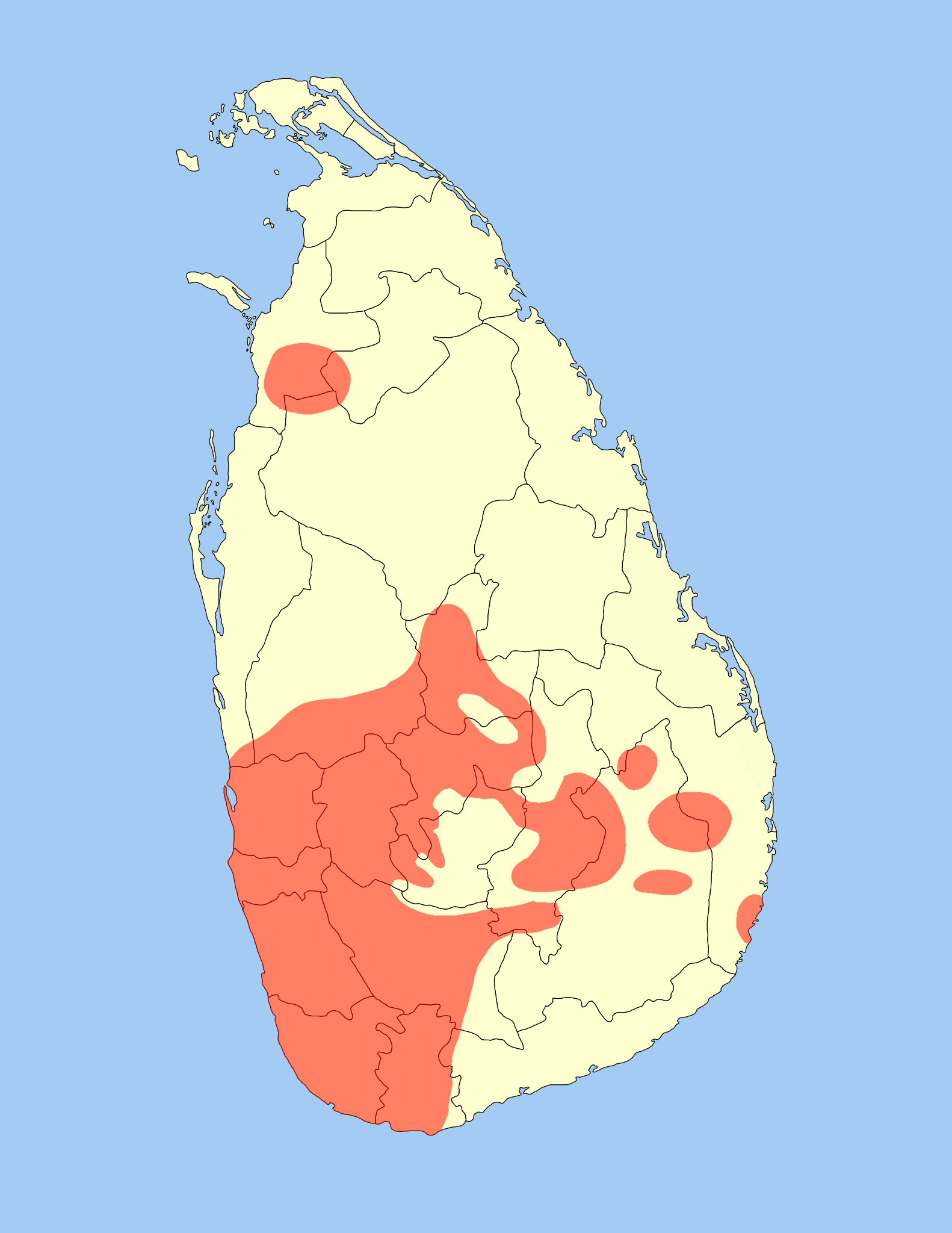
- Golden palm civet range

Synonyms
- P. montanus Kelaart, 1852; P. aureus Cuvier, 1822; P. stenocephalus Groves et al., 2009

= Golden palm civet =

Species of carnivore

The golden palm civet (Paradoxurus zeylonensis) is a viverrid endemic to Sri Lanka. It is listed as Least Concern on the IUCN Red List since 2016.The extent and quality of its habitat in Sri Lanka's hill regions are declining.

The golden palm civet was described by Peter Simon Pallas in 1778.

== Taxonomy ==
Viverra zeylonensis was the scientific name proposed by Peter Simon Pallas in 1778 for a palm civet specimen from Sri Lanka. Between the 19th and early 21st centuries, several zoological specimens were described, including:

- Paradoxurus aureus by Frédéric Cuvier in 1822
- Paradoxurus montanus by Edward Frederick Kelaart in 1852 who described a fulvous brown palm civet from the mountains of Sri Lanka, which he considered a variety of the golden palm civet.
- Paradoxurus stenocephalus by Colin Groves and colleagues in 2009 who described a golden brown specimen from Sri Lanka's dry zone. They proposed to regard P. montanus, P. aureus and P. stenocephalus as distinct species based on coat colour and skull measurements of specimens.

Genetic analysis indicates that specimens of P. montanus, P. aureus and P. stenocephalus share the same haplotype. Because of their low genetic difference, they should neither be considered distinct species nor subspecies, but junior synonyms of the golden palm civet.

== Characteristics ==
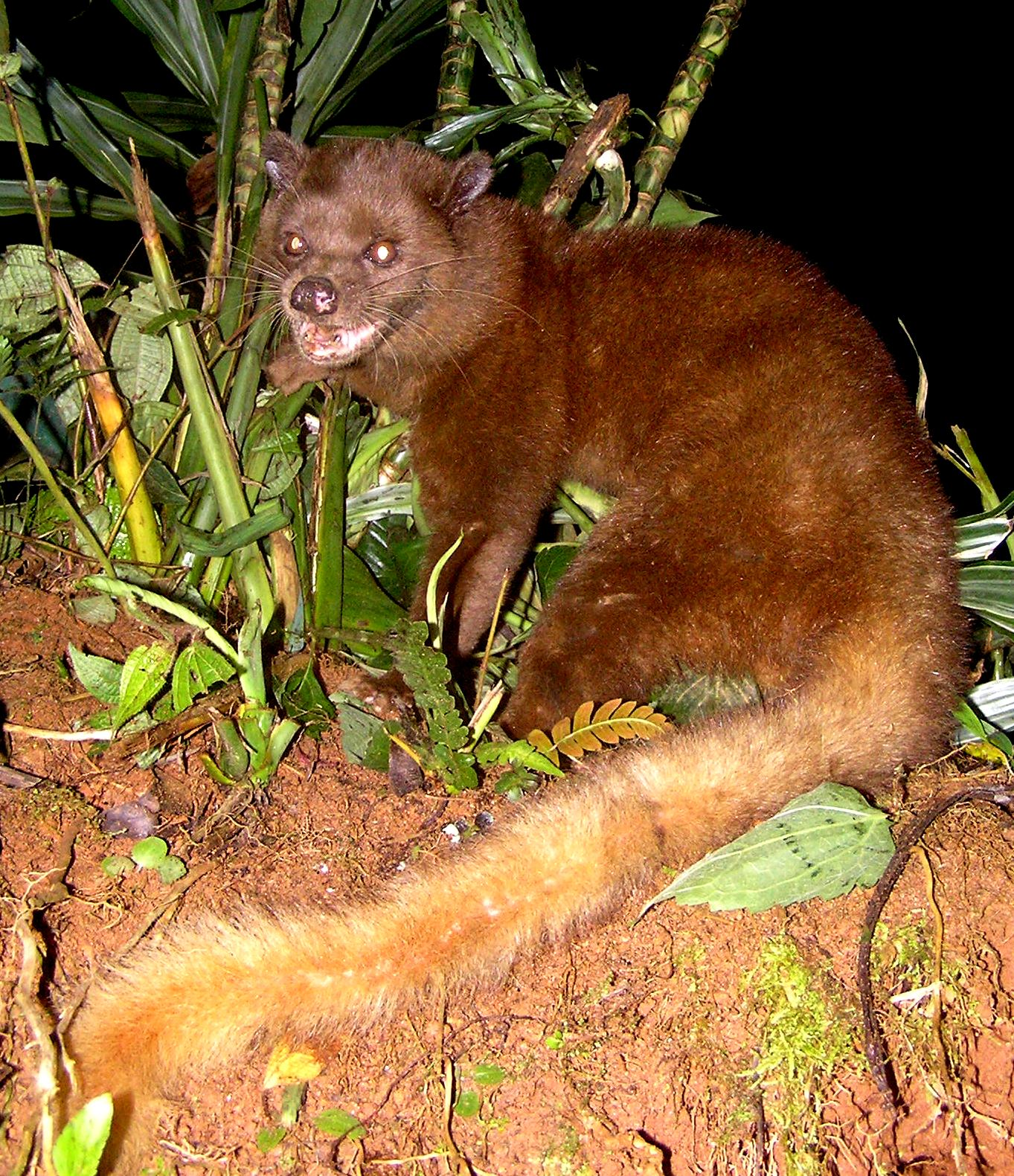
Golden palm civet in Peak Wilderness Sanctuary

The golden palm civet is gold to golden brown on the upper side and paler gold on the belly. Individuals vary from dark sepia to ochreous, rusty or golden-brown. The tips of the contour hairs are frequently lustrous, sometimes greyish. The legs are about the same tint as the back, but the tail and the face are sometimes noticeably paler, buffy-grey. The face does not have a pattern, and the vibrissae are dirty white. The hair in front of the shoulders radiates from two whorls and grows forward along the sides of the neck and the nape to the head. It also grows forward on the fore throat, radiating from a single whorl. The dorsal pattern consists of faint bands and spots that are slightly darker than the ground colour. The lower side is slightly paler and sometimes greyer than the upper. The golden palm civet has two morphs — one golden and one dark brown. Specimens from montane areas are darker, slightly greyish-toned wood-brown, and paler on the underside with a yellowish-white tail tip.

The rounded ears have hairless edges. The eyes are large with vertical pupils. It emits a pleasant odour from anal glands, which is reminiscent of Michelia champaca flowers.

== Distribution and habitat ==
The golden palm civet's distribution is largely contiguous across the island's wet, intermediate, and dry zones. An isolated population exists in Wilpattu National Park. The species' elusive, nocturnal, and arboreal nature has likely led to significant under-reporting of its true range. It occurs from sea level up to at least 2,000 m (6,600 ft) in the Central Highlands and Knuckles Mountain Range. This species inhabits lowland rainforests, tropical montane cloud forests, dense monsoon forests and dry zone forests.

It is unclear if the golden palm civet inhabits the more arid southern and eastern thorn scrub forests, as these areas have been poorly surveyed for nocturnal mammals. It is not confined to pristine forests and demonstrates considerable habitat flexibility. It is also found in degraded and secondary forests, small, fragmented forest patches, agricultural landscapes and home gardens with tall trees. There are numerous records from human-dominated areas, including near busy roads, archaeological sites like Sigiriya, and on the edges of villages. However, it does not appear to inhabit urban areas, which are typically occupied by the related Asian palm civet.

While the golden palm civet readily uses disturbed habitats, its long-term survival likely depends on the presence of some forest cover, as it is not expected to survive in completely deforested landscapes.

== Ecology and behaviour ==
The golden palm civet is forest-dependent, yet tolerant of minor habitat modification where some continuous forest remains. It is arboreal, nocturnal, and solitary; its diet consists of fruits, berries, invertebrates, and a wide range of small vertebrates.

== In culture ==
In Sri Lanka the golden palm civet is called pani uguduwa පැනි උගුඩුවා, sapumal kalawaddha සපුමල් කලවැද්දා, or ranhothambuwa රන් හොතබුවා / hotambuwa හොතබුවා, by the Sinhala speaking community. Both golden and Asian palm civets are sometimes collectively called kalawedda in Sinhala and maranai (மரநாய்) in Tamil.
