= Nolthenius's long-tailed climbing mouse =

Conservation status
- Endangered (IUCN 3.1)

Scientific classification
- Kingdom: Animalia
- Phylum: Chordata
- Class: Mammalia
- Order: Rodentia
- Family: Muridae
- Genus: Vandeleuria
- Species: V. nolthenii

Binomial name
- Vandeleuria nolthenii Phillips, 1929
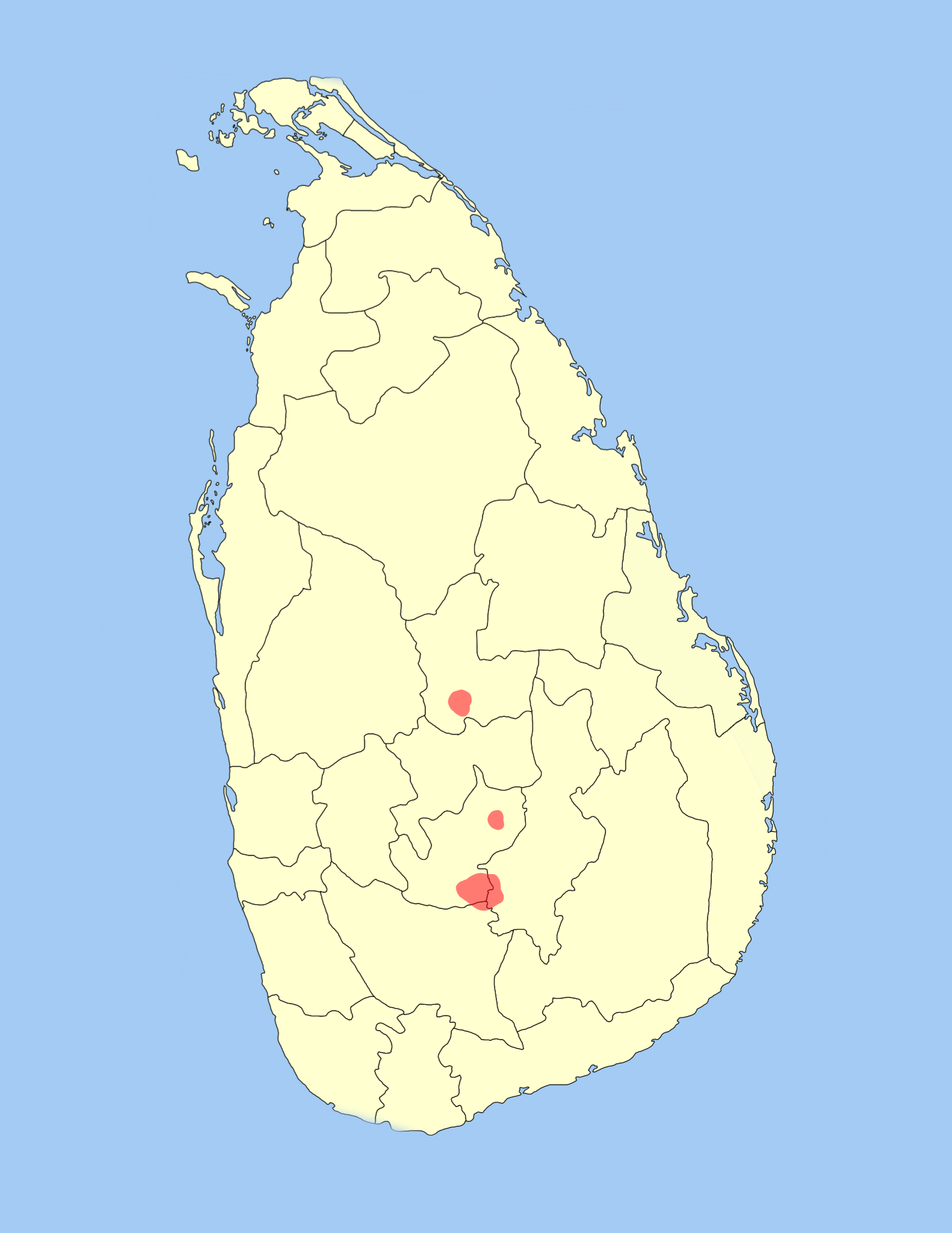
- Nolthenius's long-tailed climbing mouse Range Map

Species of rodent

Nolthenius's long-tailed climbing mouse (Vandeleuria nolthenii), also known as Sri Lanka highland tree mouse or Podi-gas-miya (Sinhala: ශ්‍රී ලංකා ගස් මීයා), is a species of rodent in the family Muridae. The species is endemic to the highlands of Sri Lanka. It is a nocturnal arboreal mouse, which is named after A. C. Tutein-Nolthenius, an amateur zoologist who collected the first specimens in 1929.

== Description ==
The body is 8 cm (3 in) – 9 cm (4 in), with a 12 cm (5 in) - 13 cm (5 in) tail. It has dark reddish brown dorsally and is darker on the back. Underparts gray. Dark brown face. Dark brown tail and ears. Long whiskers are black, short ones are silvery in color. Back fur long, soft, and dense.

== Distribution and Habitat ==
Endemic to the central highlands of Sri Lanka, this species has a restricted and fragmented distribution. Its populations are confined to montane evergreen forests at altitudes of 1,320–2,130 m in the Central Province. The species is nocturnal and arboreal.
