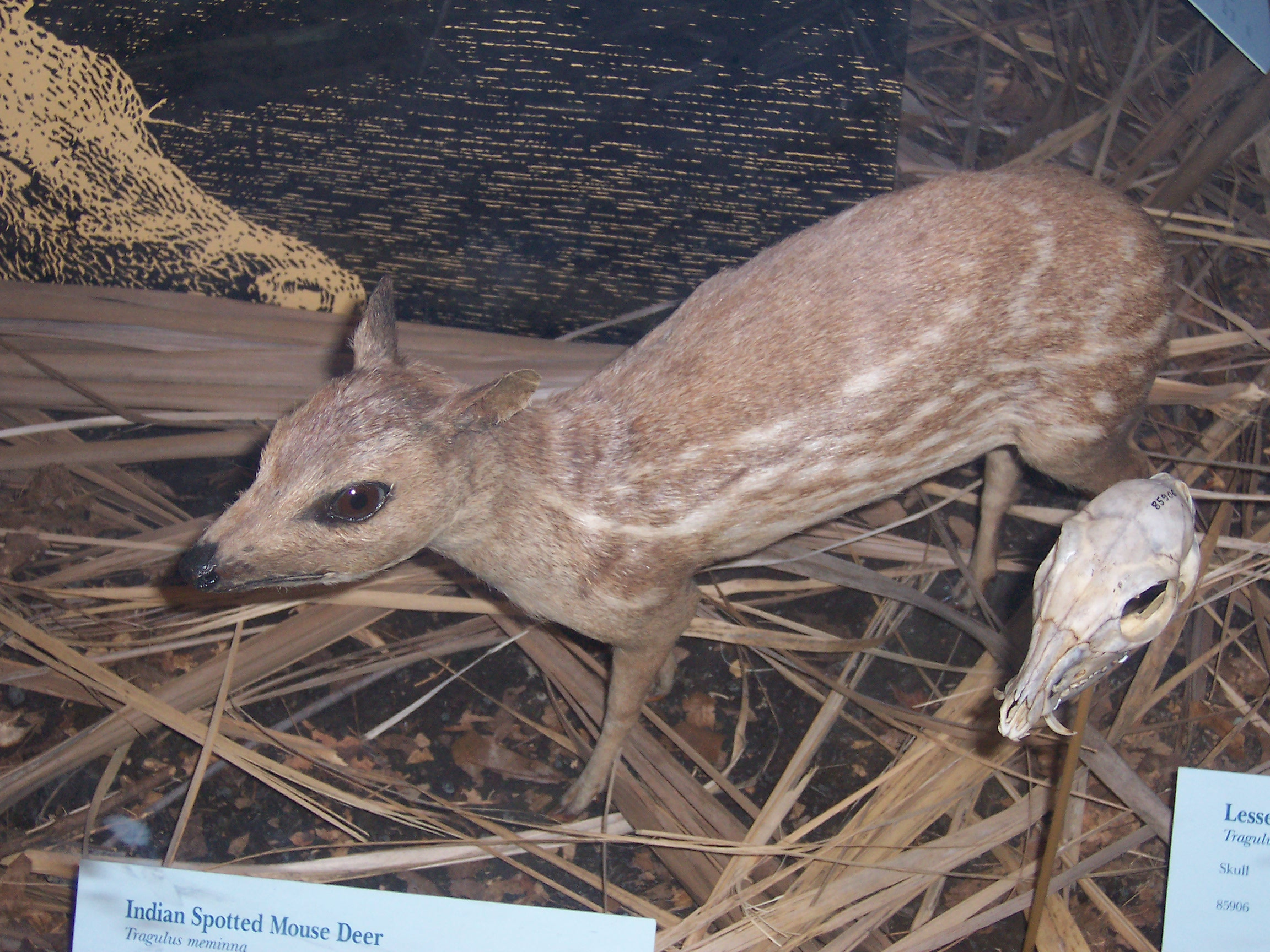
- Sri Lanka spotted chevrotain at Field Museum, mounted specimen

Conservation status
- Least Concern (IUCN 3.1)

Scientific classification
- Kingdom: Animalia
- Phylum: Chordata
- Class: Mammalia
- Order: Artiodactyla
- Family: Tragulidae
- Genus: Moschiola
- Species: M. meminna

Binomial name
- Moschiola meminna (Erxleben, 1777)
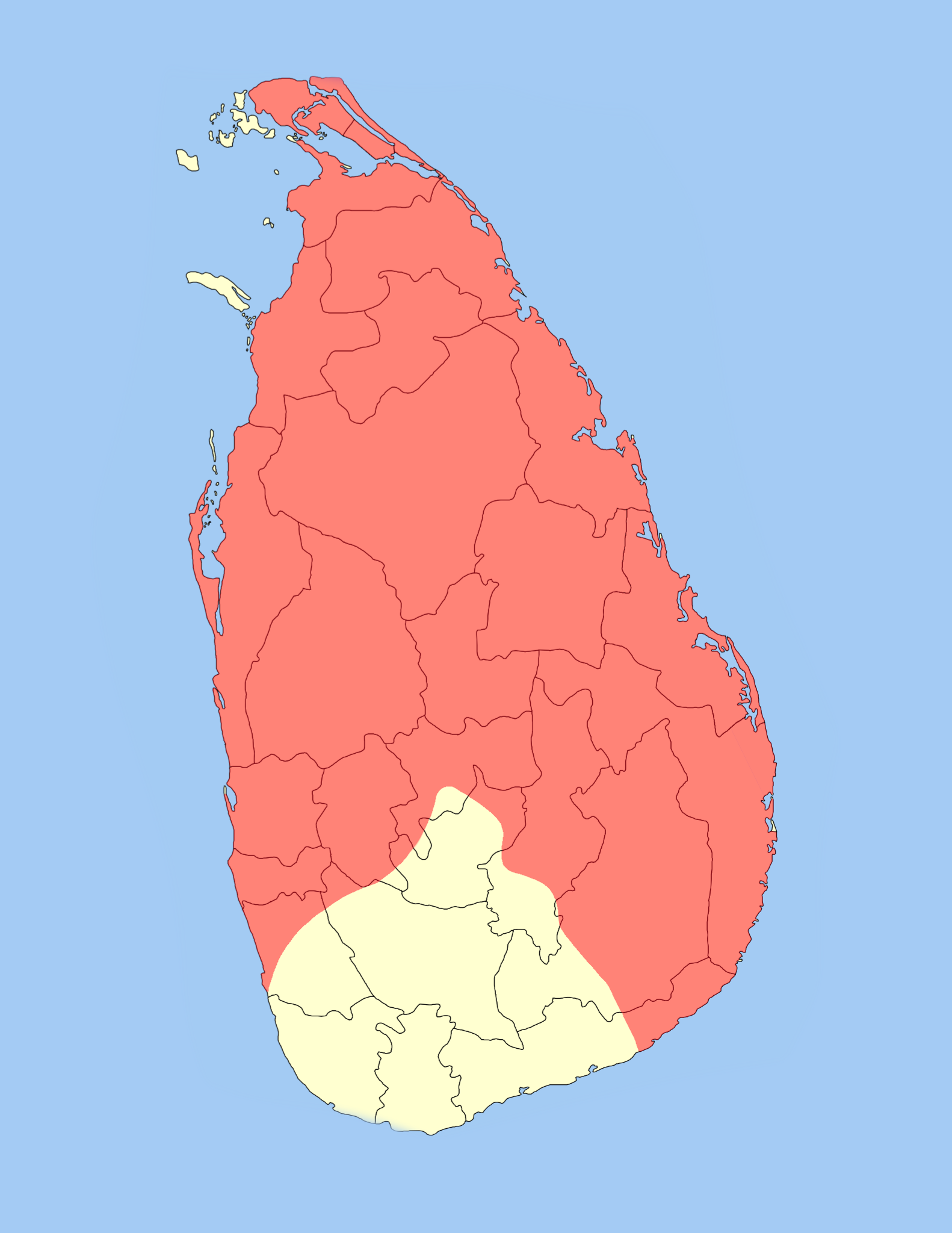

Synonyms
- Moschus meminna Erxleben, 1777; Tragulus meminna (Erxleben, 1777)

= Sri Lankan spotted chevrotain =

Species of mammal

Moschiola meminna is a species of even-toed ungulate in the chevrotain family (Tragulidae). Particularly in the old literature, M. meminna often refers to the spotted chevrotains as a whole. Today, the name is increasingly restricted to the Sri Lankan spotted chevrotain or white-spotted chevrotain, with the Indian spotted chevrotain M. indica and/or the yellow-striped chevrotain M. kathygre treated as distinct species.

== Description ==
Head and body length in the species typically is 55–60 cm (22–24 in). It is dull brown in color with three or four dotted white stripes going longitudinally along flank.

== Distribution ==
Moschiola meminn is endemic to the dry zone of Sri Lanka and it’s likely widespread throughout this region, which encompasses most of the island except for the wet zone inhabited by the yellow-striped chevrotain.

== Habitat ==
This chevrotain is a denizen of deciduous vegetation formations within the dry zone. It is fundamentally a forest species, being commonly found in all dry zone forest types. It also adapts to cultivated areas, including coconut plantations and home gardens. The species is seldom found far from water sources.
