= Sri Lankan long-tailed shrew =

Conservation status
- Endangered (IUCN 3.1)

Scientific classification
- Kingdom: Animalia
- Phylum: Chordata
- Class: Mammalia
- Order: Eulipotyphla
- Family: Soricidae
- Genus: Crocidura
- Species: C. miya

Binomial name
- Crocidura miya Phillips, 1929
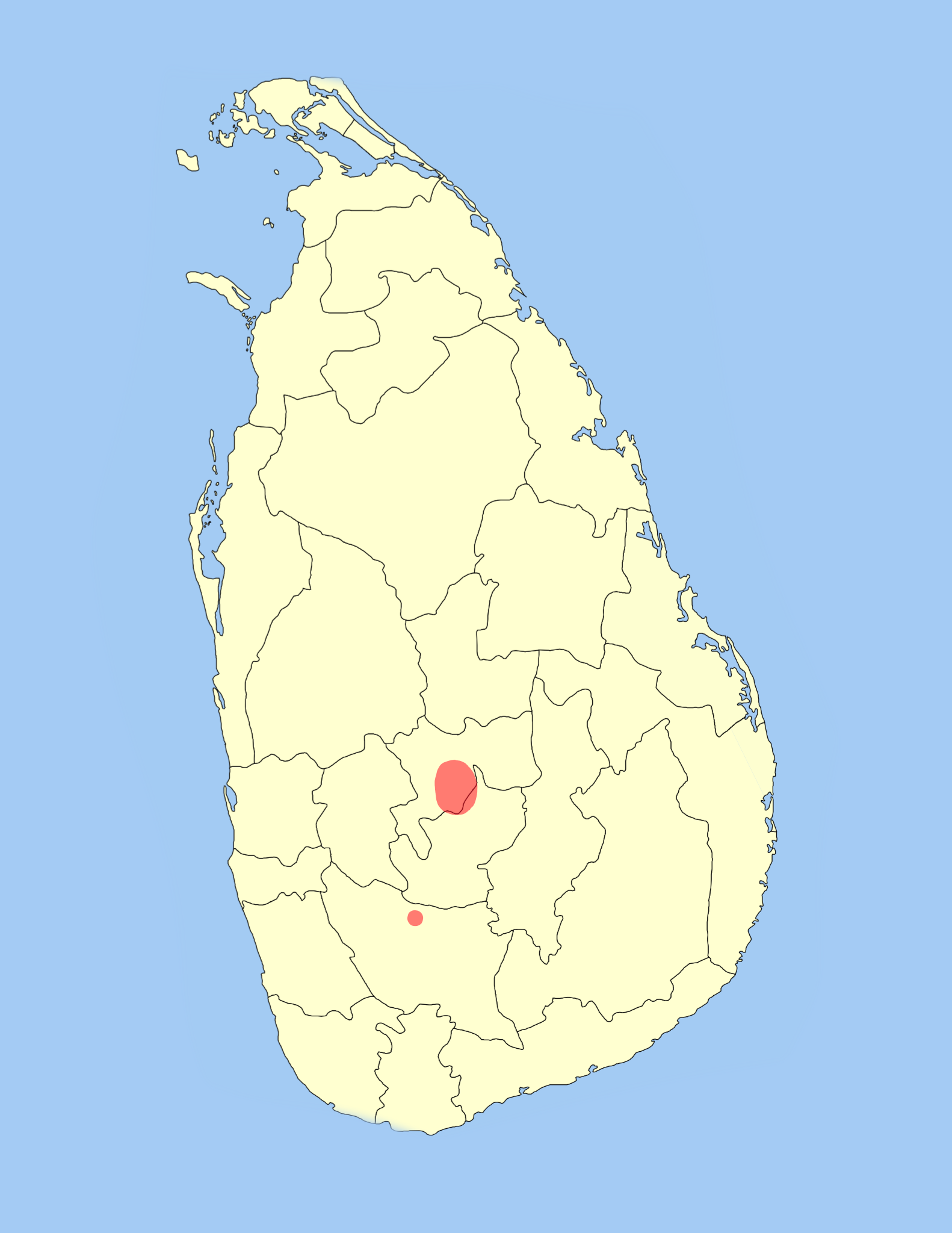
- Sri Lankan long-tailed shrew range

Species of mammal

The Sri Lankan long-tailed shrew (Crocidura miya) is a species of mammal in the family Soricidae. It is endemic to Sri Lanka.

== Description ==
The head and body length of the Sri Lankan long-tailed shrew is 7–8.5 centimetres (2.8–3.3 in), and the tail is 9–10 cm (3.5–3.9 in) long. It is brown above with gray at the base of hairs and is colored slightly lighter below. The tail is brown and longer than the head and body combined.

== Distribution ==
This species is endemic to the island's Central Highlands. Its distribution is highly fragmented, with confirmed records from only five localities: Agarapatana, Galaha-Moolgama, and Talawakelle in the Central Province, and Ohiya and Hakgala in the Uva Province. It occurs across a broad altitudinal range, from 330 to 2,310 meters above sea level.

== Ecology ==
It is nocturnal and crepuscular, and leads a fossorial (burrowing) lifestyle. Its primary habitat is tropical montane and lowland forests, specifically the wet Patana grasslands found within these forested areas. It is listed as endangered under criteria B1ab(iii)+2ab(iii).
