= Sri Lanka lowland rain forests =

Ecoregion in Sri Lanka

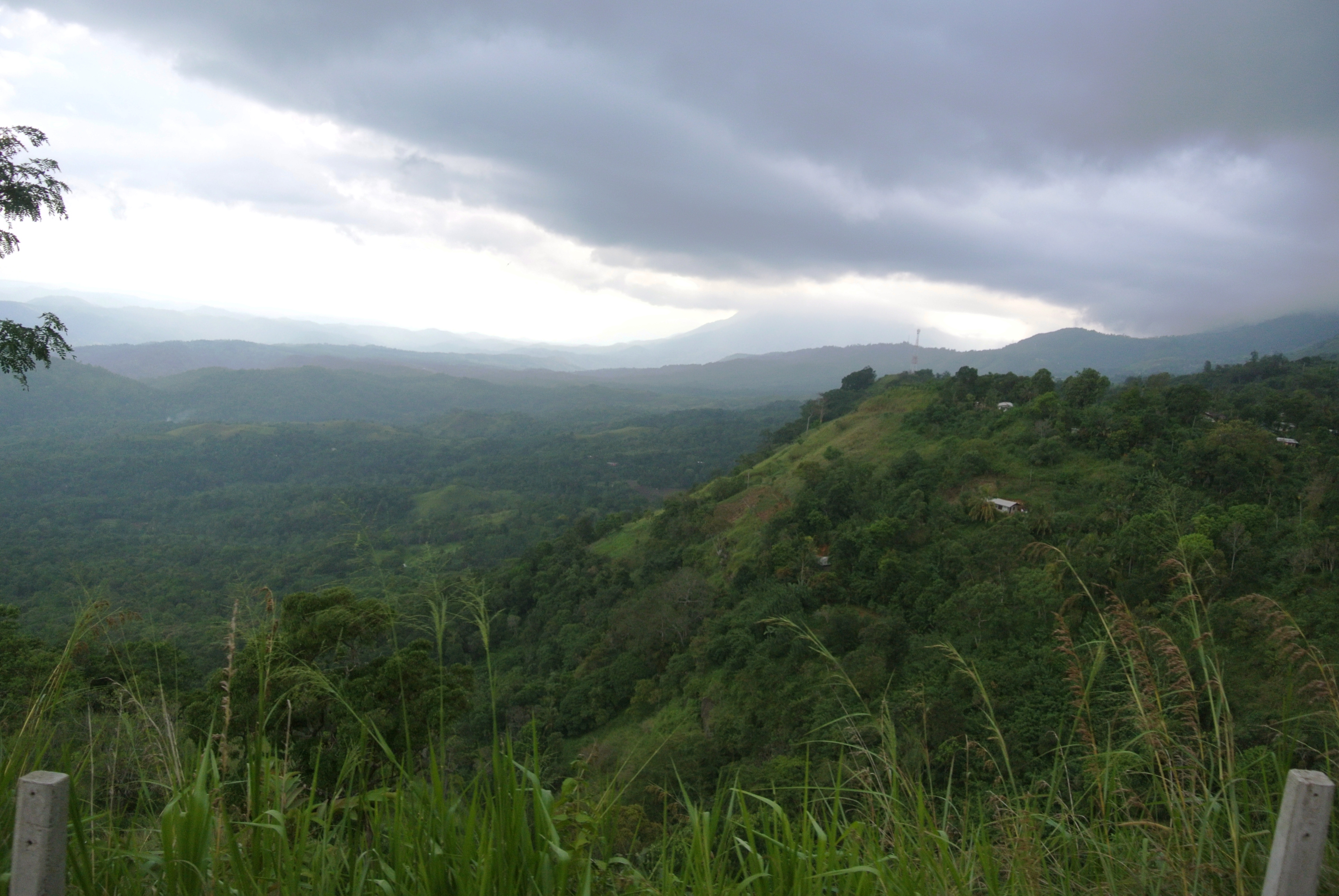
- Lowland rain forest in the south of Badulla District.

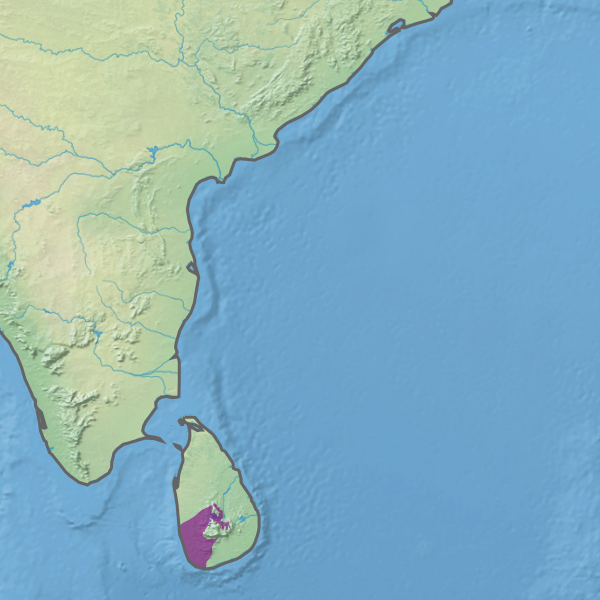
- Ecoregion territory (in purple)

Ecology
- Realm: Indomalayan
- Biome: tropical and subtropical moist broadleaf forests
- Borders: Sri Lanka dry-zone dry evergreen forests; Sri Lanka montane rain forests

Geography
- Area: 12,493 km^{2} (4,824 mi^{2})
- Country: Sri Lanka

Conservation
- Conservation status: critical/endangered
- Global 200: Sri Lanka moist forests (with Sri Lanka montane rain forests)
- Protected: 1,176 km² (9%)

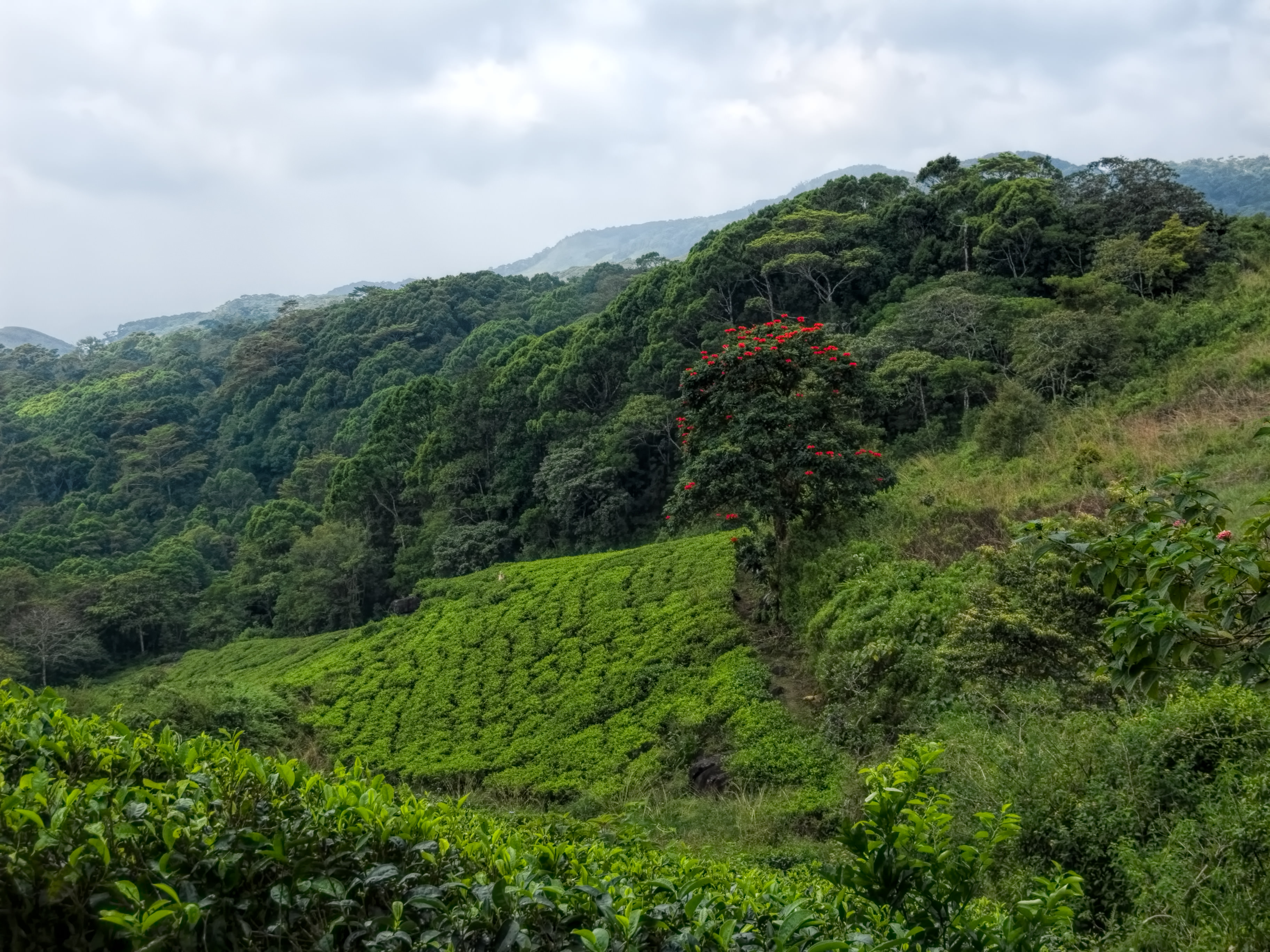
World Heritage Site Sinharaja Forest Reserve is an important forest in this ecoregion

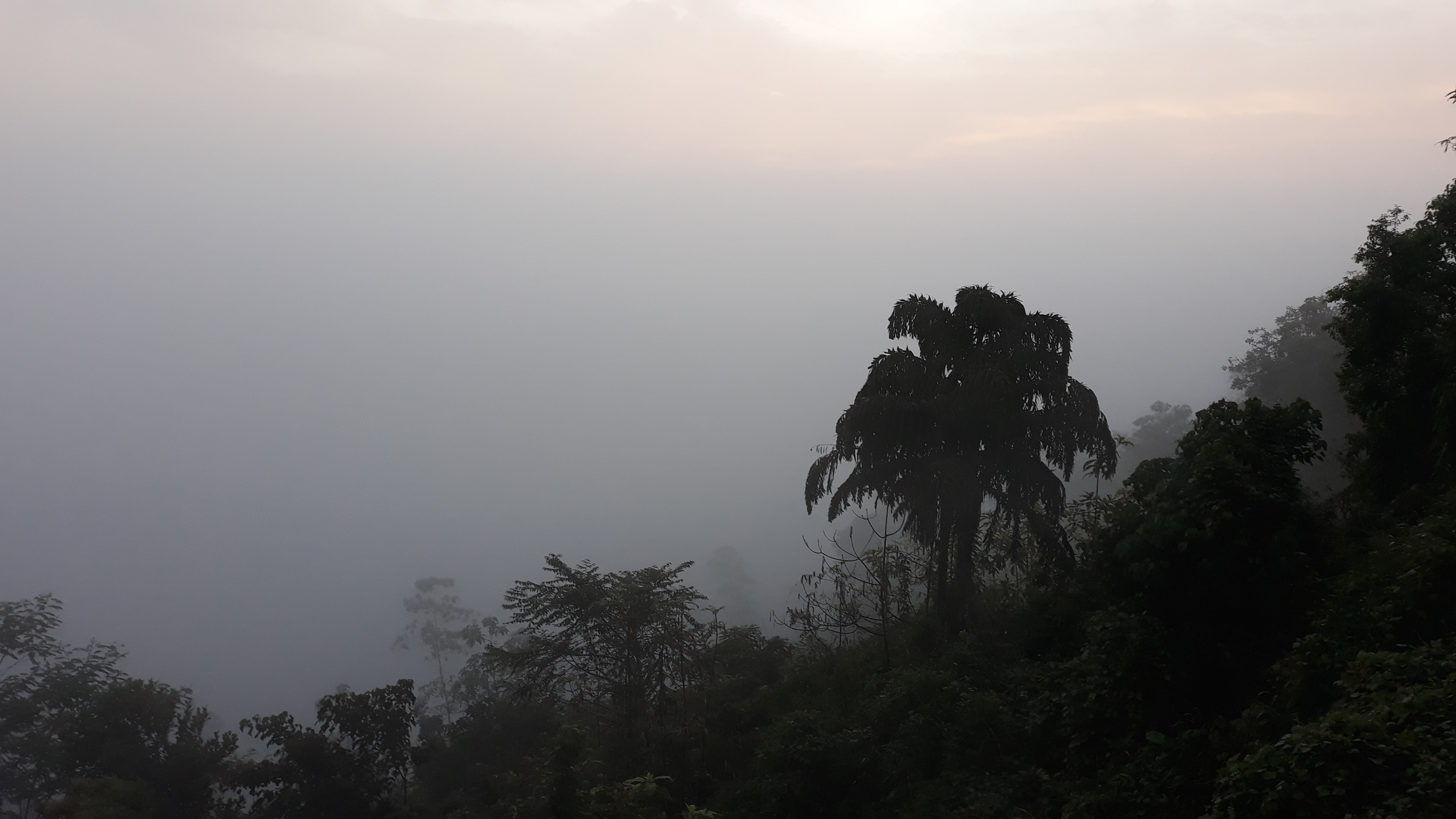
Lowland rain forest in the Western Province

The Sri Lanka lowland rain forests represents Sri Lanka's Tropical rainforests below 1,000 m (3,281 ft) in elevation in the southwestern part of the island. The year-around warm, wet climate together with thousands years of isolation from mainland India have resulted in the evolution of numerous plants and animal species that can only be found in rain forests in Sri Lanka. The thick forest canopy is made up of over 150 species of trees, some of the emergent layer reaching as high as 45 m (148 ft). The lowland rain forests accounts for 2.14 percent of Sri Lanka's land area. This ecoregion is the home of the jungle shrew, a small endemic mammal of Sri Lanka. Sri Lanka has the highest density of amphibian species worldwide. Many of these, including 250 species of tree frogs, live in these rain forests.

== Forest cover ==
The lowland rain forests cover 124,340.8 ha (480.1 sq mi) in total and accounts for 2.14 percent of Sri Lanka's land area. Wet monsoon forests receive 2,500–1,800 mm (98–71 in) of annual rainfall and are situated belove 1,000 meters (3,281 ft) of altitude. Kanneliya, Viharakele, Nakiyadeniya,Yagirala, Pilikuttuwa, Labugama Kalatuwa, Kottawa, Hiyare, Sooriyakanda, Walankanda, Mahausakanda, Hinidumakanda, Ilumbakanda and Sinharaja, which is a World Heritage Site, are the forests that represent this ecoregion. Bambarabotuwa, Morapitiya Runakanda, Makandawa, Kitulgala, Bambaragala, Kalugala, Dellawa, Meethirigala, Udakeeruwa, Gilimale and Eratne are some of the other forest reserves. Even rainfall throughout the year, and invariable temperature resulted in rich biodiversity. These forests also act as an important catchment area for rivers.

District	Lowland rain forests in ha	Lowland rain forests in sq. miles	Wet monsoon forests in ha	Wet monsoon forests in sq. miles
Ampara	—	—	45,519.2	175.8
Badulla	1,610.6	6.2	15,750.8	60.8
Batticaloa	—	—	13,378.2	51.7
Colombo	1,359.7	5.2	—	—
Galle	18,849.4	72.8	—	—
Gampaha	240.8	0.9	—	—
Hambantota	207	0.8	570.3	2.2
Kalutara	14,021.2	54.1	—	—
Kandy	14,065.5	54.3	3,543.9	13.7
Kegalle	9,985.1	38.6	44.2	0.2
Kurunegala	—	—	1,260.9	4.9
Matale	8,217	31.7	31,108.7	120.1
Matara	15,717.6	60.7	1,772	6.8
Monaragala	392.5	1.5	56,769	219.2
Nuwara Eliya	3,639.3	14.1	121.4	0.5
Polonnaruwa	—	—	46,388	179.1
Ratnapura	36,035.1	139.1	5,746.4	22.2
Trincomalee	—	—	4	0.015
Total	124,340.8	480.1	221,977	857.1

== Geological history ==
Sri Lanka is a continental island, separated from the Asian continent only by shallow Palk Strait. Sri Lanka was once a part of Gondwanaland, until the Cretaceous Period. Then as a part of the Indian Plate, it detached and drifted northward. The Indian Plate collided with the Asian mainland about 55 million years later. Therefore, there are many ancient Gondwana taxonomic groups present in Sri Lanka. Sri Lanka first became separated from the mainland Indian subcontinent during the late Miocene Epoch. Due to climatic changes, an intermittent drier region emerged between the moist forests in southwest Sri Lanka and the Western Ghats in India, the closest other moist forests. Although the island has been connected with the mainland repeatedly by land bridges since the initial separation, Sri Lanka's moist forests and its wet forest-adapted biota have been identified as being ecologically isolated.

== Features ==
The ecoregion partially encircles the Central Massif, which reach above 2,500 m (8,202 ft) and detached Knuckles Mountain Range. These mountains are represented by their own ecoregion, Sri Lanka montane rain forests. The type of the soil of the ecoregion is red-yellow podzolic soil. The extended Southwestern monsoon in May to September brings more than 5,000 mm (196.9 in) of rainfall to the ecoregion. The temperature remains constantly between 27–30 °C (81–86 °F) throughout the year. Due to the proximity to the Indian Ocean daily temperatures are relieved by the ocean breezes. Relative humidity ranges between 75%-85%.

== Flora ==
The vegetation of the region is determined primarily by climate, with topography and edaphic conditions contributing secondarily. Two floral communities dominate in the Sri Lankan lowland rain forests - the Dipterocarpus-dominated (Sinhalese "Hora") community and the Mesua-Doona community (Sinhalese "Na-Doona"). The Dipterocarpus community comprises Dipterocarpus zeylanicus, Dipterocarpus hispidus, Vitex altissima, Chaetocarpus castanicarpus, Dillenia retusa, Dillenia triquetra, Myristica dactyloides, and Semecarpus gardneri. The Mesua-Doona community comprises Anisophyllea cinnamomoides, Cullenia rosayroana, Mesua ferrea (the national tree of Sri Lanka), Myristica dactyloides, Palaquium petiolare, Doona affinis, Doona congestiflora, Doona disticha, Doona macrophylla, Doona trapezifolia, Doona venulosa, Syzygium rubicundum, and a sub canopy of Chaetocarpus castanicarpus, Garcinia hermonii, Syzygium neesianum, and Xylopia championii. Virgin forests of this ecoregion have four strata, a main canopy at 30–40 m (98–131 ft), a sub-canopy at 15–30 m (49–98 ft), a 5–15 m (16–49 ft) understory, and a sparse shrub layer. Trees of the emergent layer reach above the main canopy to 45 m (148 ft).

Sinharaja forest is the most dense rain forest in Asia.The total vegetation density has been estimated to be around 240,000 plants per hectare.

Freshwater swamp forests situated closer to the coastlines are a distinct plant community within the ecoregion. Avicennia-Rhizophora-Sonneratia dominated mangroves fringe the coastlines.

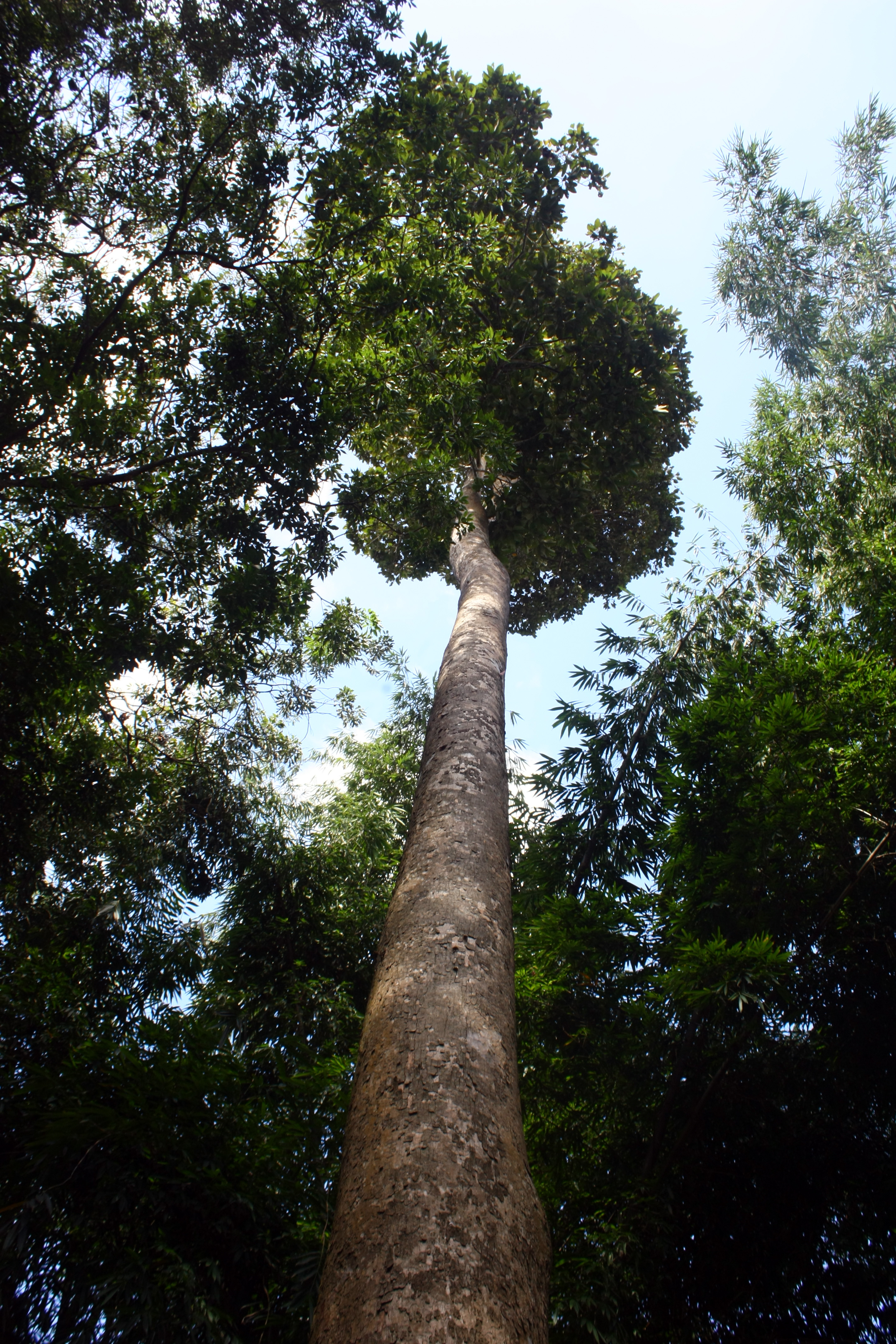
Dipterocarpus zeylanicus, the most common canopy layer and emergent layer plant in lowland rainforests

Anthoshorea stipularis, a giant lowland rainforest canopy plant in Sinharaja Forest Reserve

Vesak orchid in Peak Wilderness Sanctuary

== Biodiversity ==
Almost all the endemic flora and fauna of Sri Lanka are confined to the southwestern rain forests. Due to the warm and moist climate and long physical isolation, wet forest adopted species have promoted a high degree of endemism and specialization. More than 60 percent of 306 endemic tree species of Sri Lanka are restricted to this ecoregion. A further 61 species are shared with the montane rain forests and dry forests. The dominant tree family in Asian rain forests, the family Dipterocarpaceae shows a special endemicity. All but one species of the 58 species of the family Dipterocarpaceae can only be found in these rain forests, including two endemic genera, Doona and Stemonoporus. Anoectochilus setaceus or Wanaraja (Sinhalese for "King of forest"), an endemic orchid, is only found in undisturbed forests of this ecoregion. Several plant species show highly localized distribution. The lowland and sub montane forests are the floristically richest in Sri Lanka and of all South Asia.

== Fauna ==
=== Mammals ===
Sri Lanka lacks the land area to support large animals. Although fossil records of ancestral forms of rhinoceroses, hippopotamuses, and lions have been found. Despite the small number of species, this ecoregion is home to several near-endemic mammals, including one strict endemic species, the jungle shrew. The two endemic shrews, the Asian highland shrew and the jungle shrew are listed as vulnerable and endangered respectively. The Sri Lanka leopard, the largest carnivore of the island, is identified as threatened. Sri Lankan elephants live in small numbers in these rain forests and are listed as endangered. Unlike in dry-zone forests, where they live in large numbers, this ecoregion's elephant population is faced with habitat loss and fragmentation.

Sinharaja Forest Reserve supports the last two remaining lowland rainforest elephant individuals in the country.

Elephants in Sinharaja Forest Reserve

Peak Wilderness Sanctuary supports the last remnant wet zone and montane region elephant population in the country following its separation from the lowland forests. This separation caused by deforestation has isolated an estimated number of 30 – 50 elephants, a population size that allows the viability of the species, in the mountainous high elevations of the peak wilderness forests. This herd of elephants is known as 'The Ghost Herd'. On the first sighting in the 2000s, Wildlife Officer Anil Vithanage found these elephants at the Dharmaraja Gala area of the Peak Wilderness Sanctuary.

The Indian hare, fishing cat and rusty-spotted cat are some of the other mammals who dwell in this ecoregion.

The near-endemic and strict endemic mammals live in the areas listed below. Strict endemic species are marked with an asterisk.

- Asian highland shrew
- Jungle shrew*
- Thailand roundleaf bat
- Purple-faced langur
- Golden palm civet
- Layard's palm squirrel
- Travancore flying squirrel
- Ceylon spiny mouse
- Nolthenius's long-tailed climbing mouse

=== Birds ===
This ecoregion is completely contained within the Endemic bird area of Sri Lanka. Out of sixteen bird species categorized as near-endemic, two species, the green-billed coucal and the white-throated flowerpecker are indigenous. The green-billed coucal and the Sri Lanka whistling-thrush are listed as threatened. The ashy-headed laughingthrush, red-faced malkoha and scaly thrush are the other threatened species.

The near-endemic and strict endemic birds live in the areas listed below. Strict endemic species are marked with an asterisk.

- Sri Lanka wood pigeon
- Sri Lanka grey hornbill
- Red-faced malkoha
- Green-billed coucal*
- Sri Lanka spurfowl
- Sri Lanka junglefowl
- Sri Lanka blue magpie
- Spot-winged thrush
- White-faced starling
- Sri Lanka myna
- Kashmir flycatcher
- Brown-capped babbler
- Orange-billed babbler
- White-throated flowerpecker*
- Yellow-fronted barbet
- Sri Lanka hanging parrot
- Layard's parakeet
- Chestnut-backed owlet

=== Reptiles, fishes and amphibians ===
Sri Lanka's reptile fauna includes 204 species with 114 endemic species. A further 17 taxa are endemic at subspecies level. The mugger crocodile and the spineless forest lizard are listed as endangered along with eight freshwater fish species. Sri Lanka has the highest density of amphibian species worldwide (3.9 species per 1,000 square kilometres (386 sq mi)). These include 250 species of frogs belonging to the family Rhacophoridae. Many of these species have only limited range distributions, often less than 0.5 km^{2} (0.19 sq mi). These species are also faced with habitat fragmentation and loss.

== Threats and conservation ==
Most of the Sri Lanka's rain forests were cleared for plantations, originally for coffee and cinchona and then tea and rubber. The remaining forests cover only 4.6 percent of the wet zone. Between 1990 and 2005, Sri Lanka has had one of the highest deforestation rates of primary forests in the world. A survey carried out in 2005 found that 17 of Sri Lanka's frogs have become extinct in the past decade and another 11 species face imminent threat of extinction unless their habitat is secured. These remaining forests exist as highly fragmented patches. Most of them are less than 10 km^{2} (3.86 sq mi) in extent. Poaching and the extraction of forest products (timber, firewood, medicinal plants) are a problem in almost all forest reserves.

Nevertheless, if the existing forests are preserved the condition can be improved, as many of the species of this ecoregion have small habitat needs. There are several protected areas that overlap with the ecoregion. The two most notable are the world heritage site the Sinharaja Forest Reserve and the Peak Wilderness Sanctuary. Altogether, protected areas of this ecoregion accounts for only 260 square kilometres (100.39 sq mi).

Protected areas that overlap with the ecoregion:

Protected area	Area km ^{2}	Area sq. mi	IUCN Category
Sri Jayewardenepura bird sanctuary	30	11.6	IV
Sinharaja Forest Reserve	111.87	43.2	IV
Thelwatta	20	7.7	IV
Attidiya marsh	10	3.9	IV
Peak Wilderness Sanctuary	100	38.6	IV
Kanneliya-Dediyagala-Nakiyadeniya	101.39	39.1	IV
Total	260	100.4	
