= Sri Lanka montane rain forests =

Ecoregion in Sri Lanka

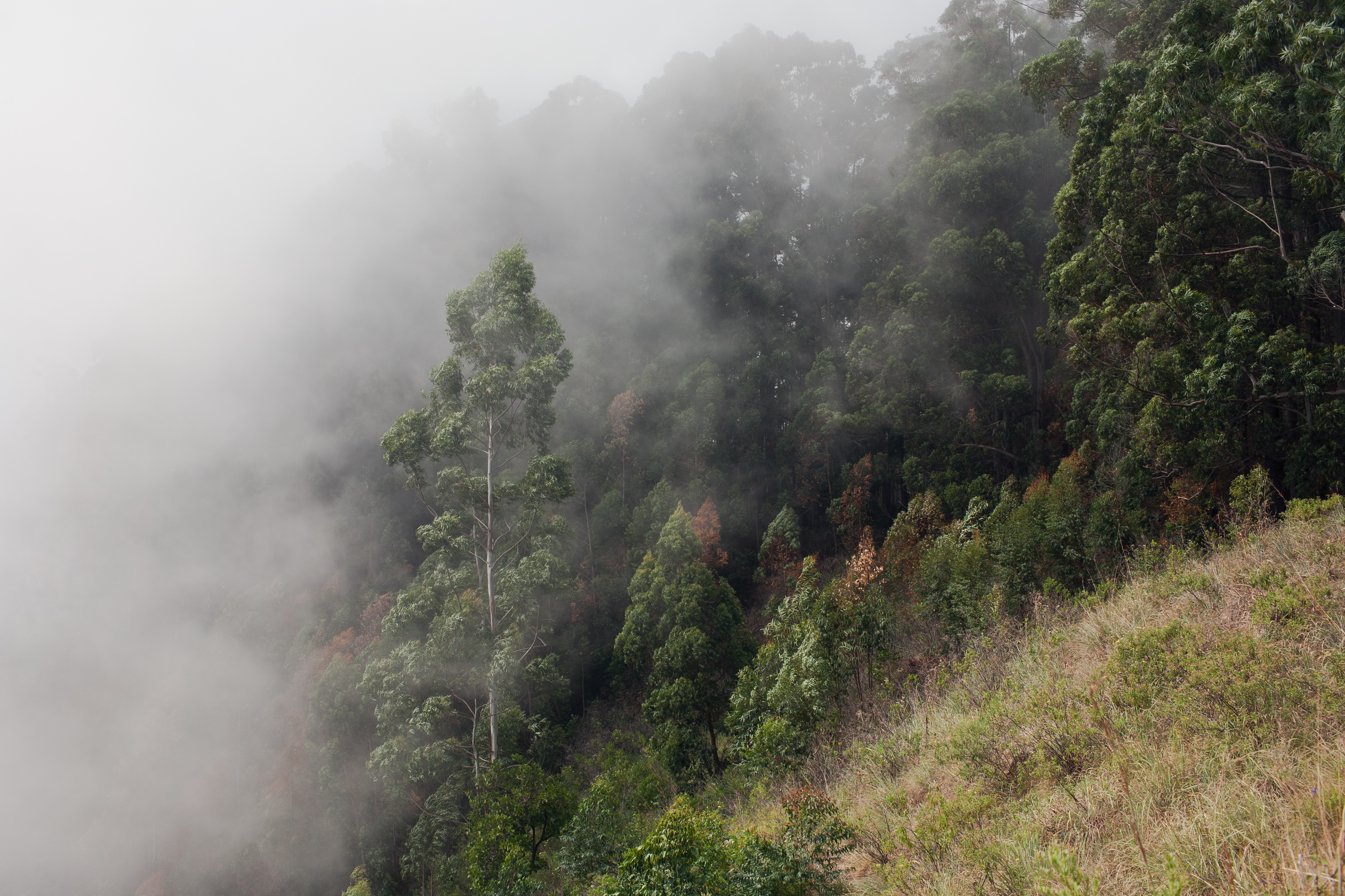
- Cloud forest near Ella

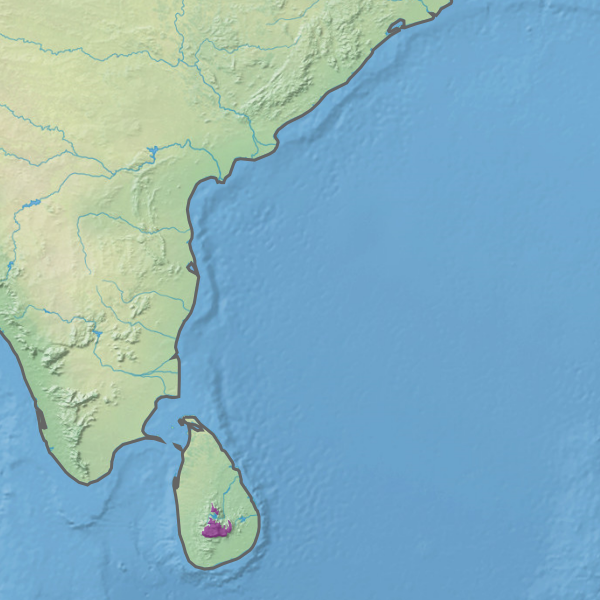
- Ecoregion territory (in purple)

Ecology
- Realm: Indomalayan
- Biome: tropical and subtropical moist broadleaf forests
- Borders: Sri Lanka dry-zone dry evergreen forests; Sri Lanka lowland rain forests

Geography
- Area: 3,066 km^{2} (1,184 mi^{2})
- Country: Sri Lanka

Conservation
- Conservation status: critical/endangered
- Global 200: Sri Lanka moist forests (with Sri Lanka lowland rain forests)
- Protected: 636 km² (21%)

The Sri Lanka montane rain forests is an ecoregion found above 1,000 m (3,300 ft) in the central highlands of Sri Lanka. Owing to their rich biodiversity, this region is considered to be a super-hotspot within endemic hotspots of global importance. These forests are cooler than lowland forests and therefore they have ideal conditions for growth of cloud forests. These forests classifications tropical sub montane forest, tropical sub-montane and tropical upper montane. Half of Sri Lanka's endemic flowering plants and 51 percent of the endemic vertebrates are restricted to these forests. More than 34 percent of Sri Lanka's endemic trees, shrubs, and herbs can only be found in this ecoregion. Twisted, stunted trees are a common sight in these forests, together with many varieties of orchids, mosses and ferns. The trees of montane rain forests grow to a height 10–15 m (33–49 ft), shorter than the lowland rain forest trees. These high altitude forests are the catchment area for most of Sri Lanka's major rivers.

== Forest cover ==
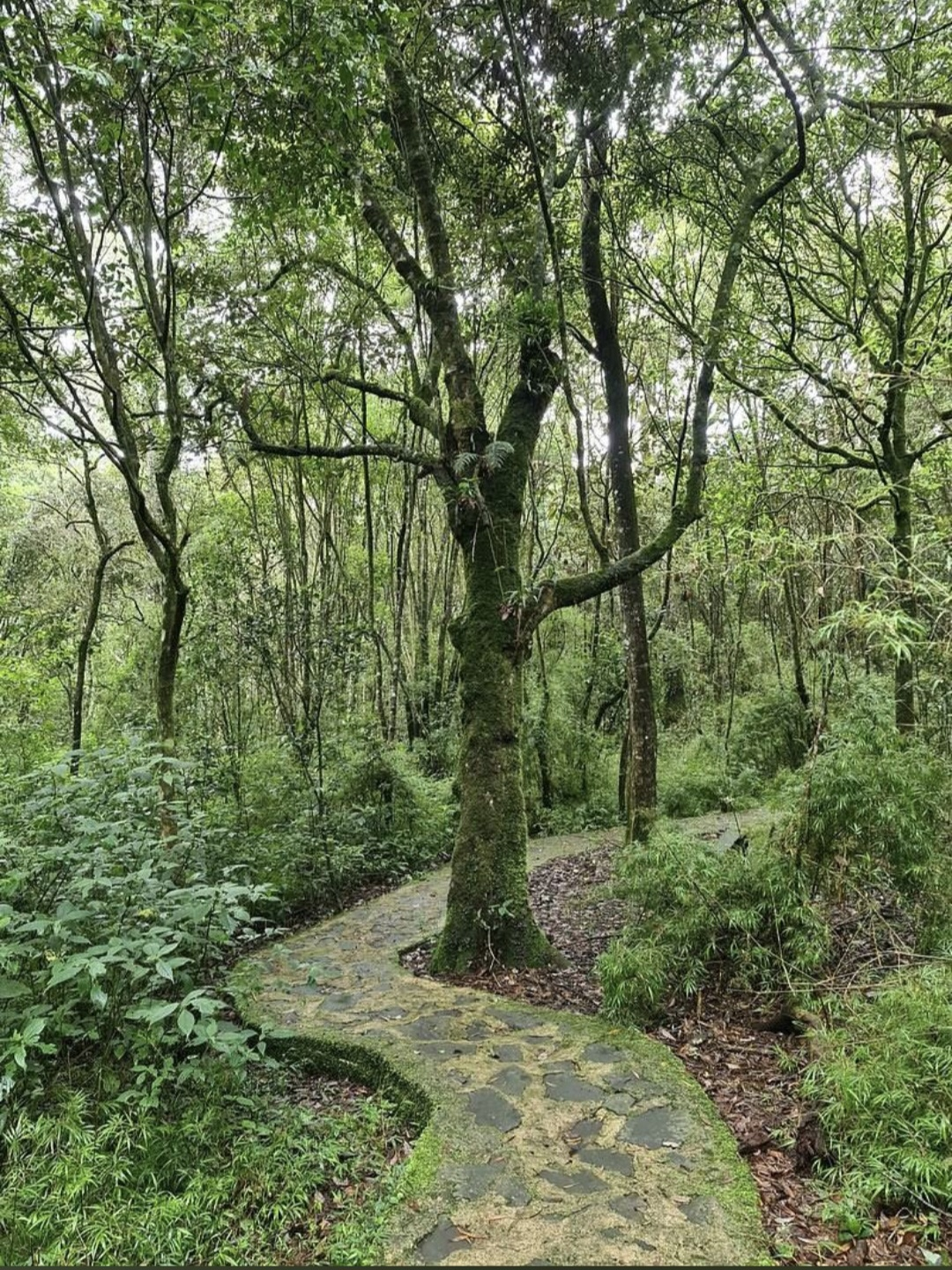
Heavily dense cloud forest vegetation in Galway's Land National Park

Tropical cloud forests in Pidurutalagala

Tropical cloud forests in Hakgala Strict Nature Reserve

Sri Lanka's montane forests are located above 1,220 m (4,000 ft). The montane rain forests cover 3,099.5 ha (7,659 acres) in total, or 0.05 percent of Sri Lanka's total area. These forests are found in the mountain tops, such as Pidurutalagala, Kikilimana, Meepilimana, Agrabopaththalawa, Knuckles, Haputale, Namunukula, Lunugala, Ragala, Batalegala, Dolosbage, Ravana ella, Hantana, Hunnasgiriya, Peak Wilderness sanctuary and Hakgala. Ambawela, Pattipola, Ohiya, Kudahagala, Agrabopath, Bagawanthalawa, Bopattalawa are some other areas that can found montane rain forests. In lower elevations, at altitudes ranging 1,000–1,500 m (3,300–4,900 ft), submontane forests occur; those forests account for 1.04 percent of the nation's area, totalling 65,793.3 ha (162,579 acres).

District	Montane forests in ha	Submontane forests in ha
Nuwara Eliya	1,940.1	29,384.1
Kandy	935.1	8,633.3
Badulla	94.5	3,030.3
Matale	89.0	4,780.4
Ratnapura	40.8	15,711.4
Kegalle	—	3,705.4
Monaragala	—	11.2
Matara	—	536.2
Total	3,099.5	65,792.3

== Geological history ==
Sri Lanka detached from the Deccan peninsula during the end of the Miocene epoch, but its origin lies within Gondwanaland. According to biogeographic patterns southwestern lowland wet forests became isolated from the nearest wet forests in the mainland soon after the separation when climatic changes created drier, warmer conditions in the lowland. Although the two lands bridged in the Pleistocene subsequently, intervening dry habitat prevented the exchange of wet climate adapted species with wet forests in India. This resulted in southwestern species to evolve and specialize separately, giving rise higher to the higher level of endemism that can be seen today.

== Features ==
Some of the mountain peaks of the central highlands reach above 2,500 m (8,200 ft), although the average height is 1,800 m (5,900 ft). Knuckles rises to 1,800 m (5,900 ft), with an average elevation of 1,500 m (4,900 ft). Because of the elevation, ambient temperature is cooler than in the lowlands. The mean temperature in this area ranges between 15–20 °C (59–68 °F). In the mornings of the winter months of December to February, ground frost appears.

The average annual rainfall ranges from 2,000–2,500 mm (79–98 in). The southwestern monsoon brings most of the rain from May to September, but the northeastern monsoon contributes a fair amount of rain as well. All of the island's major rivers arise in the central highlands, and montane rain forests act as the main catchment area.

A picturesque stream with a mossy background at the Pidurutalagala conservation forest reserve

== Flora ==
Tropical cloud forest vegetation in Pidurutalagala

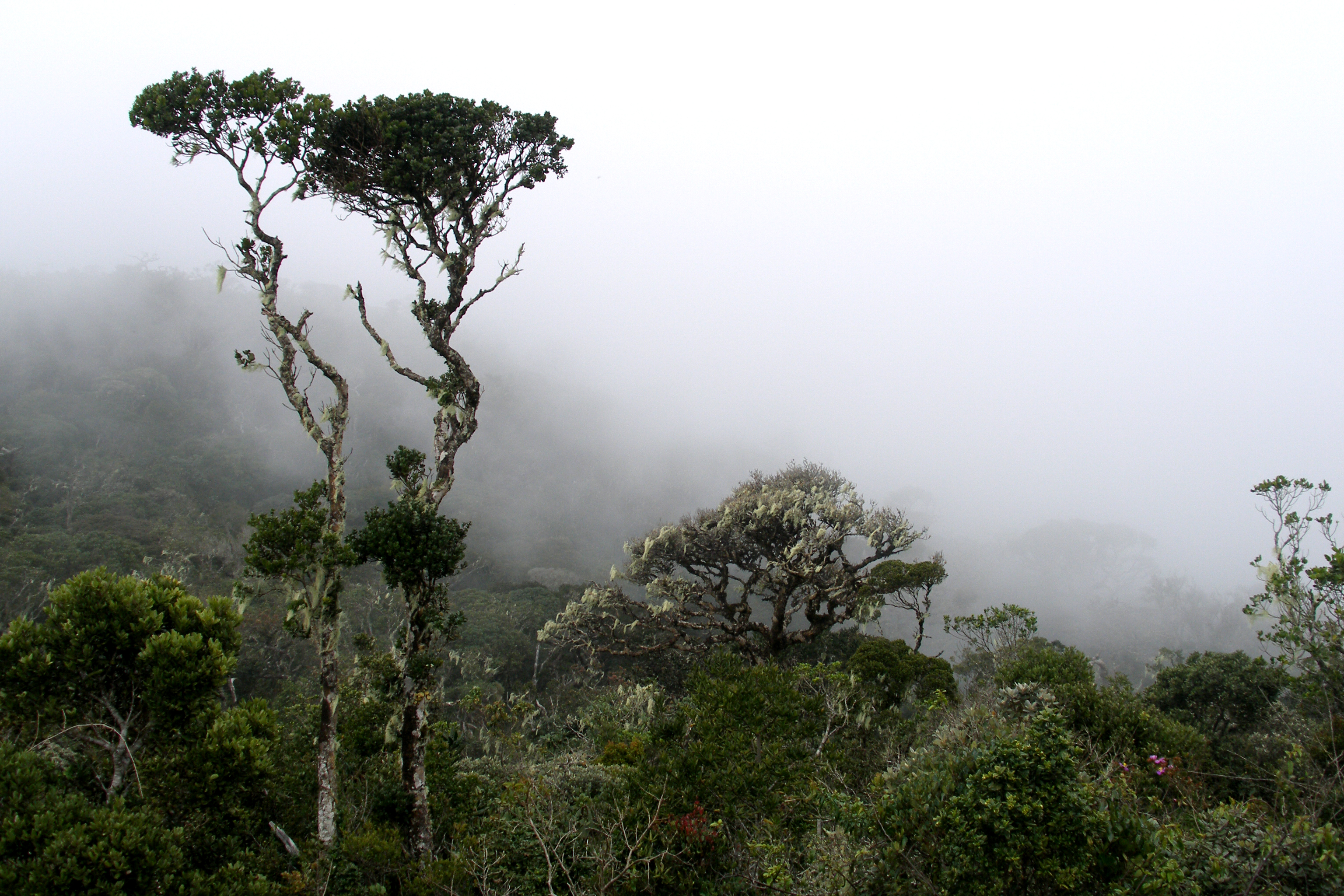
Rhododendron trees in clouds

Rhododendron arboreum in Pidurutalagala forest reserve

The vegetation of this ecoregion is determined by the climate and the elevation. Montane moist forest vegetation is dominated by Dipterocarpus while montane savanna and cloud forests feature Rhododendron. Canopies of Shorea-Calophyllum-Syzygium community can be seen in submontane forests. The understory of the higher elevations is dominated by Strobilanthes. The Peak Wilderness of all montane rain forests may be the only forest area dominated by endemic Stemonoporus of family Dipterocarpaceae. Rhododendron species thrive in the wet montane grasslands known as wet pathanas in Sinhalese. Knuckles Range's vegetation differs from the rest of the central highlands because of the geographical detachment; it has a Myristica-Cullenia-Aglaia-Litsea community.

Endemic Vesak orchid in Peak Wilderness Sanctuary

Dense and lush cloud forest undergrowth with giant tree ferns in Knuckles forest reserve

== Biodiversity ==
The montane forests accommodate more endemic species than the lowland rain forests. Half of the country's flowering plants and 51 percent of the endemic vertebrates are confined to these forests. The isolated Knuckles range harbours several relict, endemic flora and fauna that are distinct from central massif. More than 34 percent of Sri Lanka's endemic trees, shrubs, and herbs are only found in these forests.

== Fauna ==
=== Mammals ===
Montane rain forests harbours eight near-endemic mammals, and five are strict endemics. Small mammals in Sri Lanka shows a great degree of diversity, such as rodents, shrews and bats. Of these mammals 70 percent are smaller than a small cat. This area is an atypical habitat to the largest carnivore of Sri Lanka, Sri Lanka leopard. The leopard has categorised as threatened. Another five rodents listed endangered.

- Sri Lankan long-tailed shrew
- Kelaart's long-clawed shrew
- Pearson's long-clawed shrew
- Sri Lankan shrew
- Jungle shrew

The near-endemic and strict endemic mammals harbours in the area listed below. Strict endemic species marked with an asterisk.

- Asian highland shrew
- Kelaart's long-clawed shrew*
- Sri Lankan long-tailed shrew*
- Pearson's long-clawed shrew*
- Purple-faced langur
- Golden palm civet
- Layard's palm squirrel
- Dusky palm squirrel
- Travancore flying squirrel
- Ceylon spiny mouse
- Nolthenius's long-tailed climbing mouse
- Nillu rat*
- Ohiya rat*

Endemic Bear monkey(Semnopithecus vetulus monticola); the montane subspecies of Semnopithecus vetulus in Galway's Land National Park

Endemic Montane Tocaque macaque monkey(Macaca sinica opisthomelas); the montane subspecies of Macaca sinica in Galway's Land National Park

The Asian elephant, which once roamed freely in these forests, was thought to be locally extinct.Peak Wilderness sanctuary is also significant as the sanctuary that supports the last remnant wet zone and montane region elephant population in the country following its separation from the lowland forests. This separation caused by deforestation has isolated an estimated number of 30 – 50 elephants, a population size that allows the viability of the species, in the mountainous high elevations of the peak wilderness forests. It is known as 'The Ghost Herd'. On the first sighting in the 2000s, Wildlife Officer Anil Vithanage found these elephants at the Dharmaraja Gala area of the Peak Wilderness Sanctuary.It is the only herd of elephant remaining in the wet zone rain forests of the island together with the two male individual elephants in Sinharaja world heritage site.

=== Birds ===
Sri Lanka montane rain forests includes in EBA Sri Lanka. Out of twenty near-endemic birds, five of the bird species are strict endemic.

- Sri Lanka wood pigeon
- Sri Lanka grey hornbill
- Red-faced malkoha
- Sri Lanka junglefowl - The national bird of Sri Lanka
- Sri Lanka blue magpie
- White-faced starling
- Sri Lanka myna
- Orange-billed babbler
- Sri Lanka whistling thrush*
- Dull-blue flycatcher*
- Yellow-eared bulbul*
- Sri Lanka white-eye*
- Sri Lanka bush warbler*
- Spot-winged thrush
- Kashmir flycatcher
- Brown-capped babbler
- Yellow-fronted barbet
- Sri Lanka hanging parrot
- Layard's parakeet
- Chestnut-backed owlet
- Sri Lanka spurfowl

=== Reptiles and amphibians ===
Reptiles in Sri Lanka show more endemism than birds and mammals. Frogs and lizards are among the species is still being newly discovered, along with fishes and crabs.

== Threats and conservation ==
Cloud forest die back and secondary growth of them in Hakgala Strict Nature Reserve

The 15 years from 1990 to 2005 Sri Lanka showed one of the highest deforestation rates of primary forests in the world. During that period almost 18 percent of Sri Lanka's forest cover was lost, while the deforestation rate also accelerated. The fauna of Sri Lanka also threatened. A survey done in 2005 found 17 of Sri Lanka's frogs have become extinct in the past decade and another 11 species face imminent threat of extinction. From 1820 large scale forest cleared for coffee plantations and later for tea in the montane forests. The remnant patches of forest corridors logged for agriculture crops. The illicit mining of gems happen even in restricted areas.

The reason for the dying back of montane forest is attributed toxicity of soil. The Knuckles range face a different threat. Cultivation of spices especially cardamom at large scale threatens clearing of the forest.

Invasive exotic plant species such as Mist Flower (Ageratina riparia), Purple Plague (Miconia calvescens), Blue Star (Aristea ecklonii) and Coster's Curse (Clidemia hirta) that increasingly spread into otherwise well protected mountain forest areas and crowd away the native Sri Lankan flora are a major threat, if not the largest one, to Sri Lankan montane rain forest flora and fauna.

Currently the ecoregion is being protected by six protected areas. Those protected areas together accounts only 561.061 km^{2} of area. These protected areas are;

Protected area	Area km^{2}	IUCN Category
Pidurutalagala	80	VIII
Hakgala	20	I
Knuckles	217	IV
Peak Wilderness Sanctuary	223.791	IV
Horton Plains National Park	20	II
Galway's Land National Park	0.27	II
Total	561.061	

== See also ==
- Cloud forest
- Tropical and subtropical moist broadleaf forests
