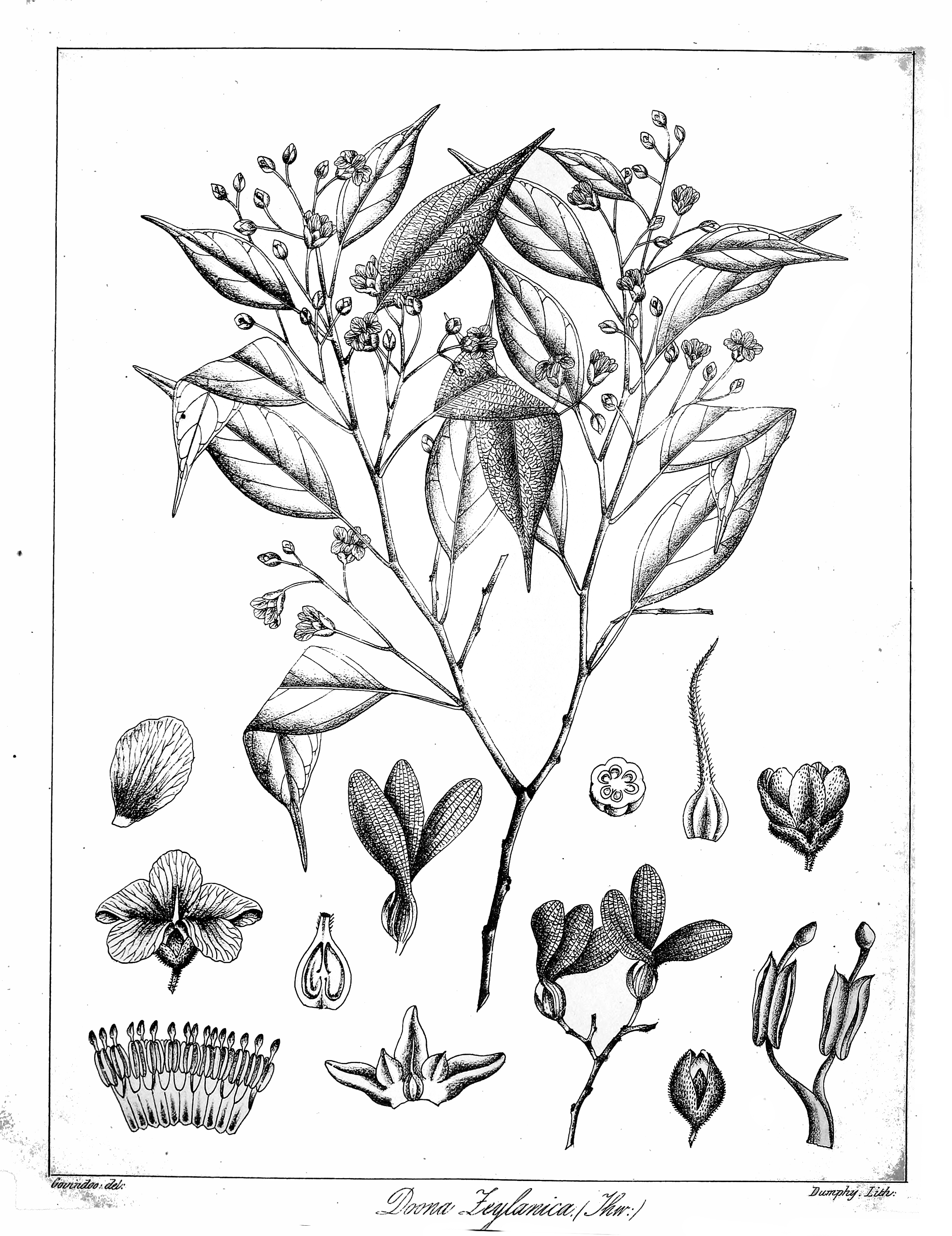

Conservation status
- Endangered (IUCN 3.1)

Scientific classification
- Kingdom: Plantae
- Clade: Tracheophytes
- Clade: Angiosperms
- Clade: Eudicots
- Clade: Rosids
- Order: Malvales
- Family: Dipterocarpaceae
- Genus: Doona
- Species: D. zeylanica

Binomial name
- Doona zeylanica Thwaites

Synonyms
- Shorea zeylanica (Thwaites) P.S.Ashton

= Doona zeylanica =

Species of flowering plant

Shorea zeylanica is a species of flowering plant in the family Dipterocarpaceae. It is a tree endemic to Sri Lanka. It is a canopy tree in the remaining lowland evergreen rain forests of southwestern Sri Lanka, becoming an emergent tree at higher elevations.
