= Arixyleborus mediosectus =

Scientific classification
- Kingdom: Animalia
- Phylum: Arthropoda
- Clade: Pancrustacea
- Class: Insecta
- Order: Coleoptera
- Suborder: Polyphaga
- Infraorder: Cucujiformia
- Superfamily: Curculionoidea
- Family: Curculionidae
- Genus: Arixyleborus
- Species: A. mediosectus

Binomial name
- Arixyleborus mediosectus (Eggers, 1923)

Synonyms
- Xyleboricus mediosectus Eggers, 1923; Xyleboricus angulatus Schedl, 1942

Species of beetle

Arixyleborus mediosectus is a species of weevil found in India, Sri Lanka, Cambodia, Myanmar, Philippines, Malaysia, Indonesia: Sumatra and Vietnam.

== Description ==
Body is about 2.1 mm long. Body long and cylindrical. Pronotum blackish brown. Elytra, legs and antennae are light brown. Head globose with moderately convex frons. Surface of the head is reticulate with sparse punctures and fine hairs. Eyes are elongate, and deeply emarginate. Antenna with 5 segmental funicle, short scape and obliquely truncate club. Pronotum elongate with substriaght basal margin and sides. Posterior portion of pronotum finely reticulate with sparse minute punctures. Scutellum is sub-round and small. Elytra broad as pronotum and with a substraight basal margin. Nearly half of elytra is smooth, flat and dull. Elytral striae marked by moderately large and very shallow punctures. Elytral interstriae covered with sparse hair-like setae. Elytral declivity is with plano-convex declivital face. Declivity is distinctly carinate and distinctly raised with prominent tubercles.

== Biology ==
A polyphagous species, it is commonly found in many Dipterocarpus species.

=== Host plants ===
- Artocarpus chaplasa
- Balanocarpus heimii
- Canarium euphyllum
- Dendrocalamus strictus
- Terminalia bialata
- Dipterocarpus pilosus
- Dipterocarpus turbinatus
- Dipterocarpus zeylanicus
