= Doona ovalifolia =

Conservation status
- Critically Endangered (IUCN 3.1)

Scientific classification
- Kingdom: Plantae
- Clade: Tracheophytes
- Clade: Angiosperms
- Clade: Eudicots
- Clade: Rosids
- Order: Malvales
- Family: Dipterocarpaceae
- Genus: Doona
- Species: D. ovalifolia

Binomial name
- Doona ovalifolia Thwaites (1864)

Synonyms
- Shorea ovalifolia (Thwaites) P.S.Ashton (1972 publ. 1973)

Species of tree

Doona ovalifolia is a species of flowering plant in the family Dipterocarpaceae. It is a tree endemic to Sri Lanka. It is known as pini-beraliya in Sinhala. It grows along shallow streams in the remaining lowland rain forests of southwestern Sri Lanka. The tree has been extirpated from its original collection locations of the 1860s. Populations were recently found at Ayagama (2020) and Kelinkanda (2023).

== Distribution and habitat ==
Doona ovalifolia grows in lowland rain forests of southwestern Sri Lanka. It was classified as "extinct in the wild" in the year 2012 with only one specimen surviving at the Royal Botanic Gardens, Peradeniya before a mature specimen was found in Ayagama and further wild populations were found, one in Western province and another in North Western province. It's endemic to Sri Lanka and is typically found near streams and rivers.
