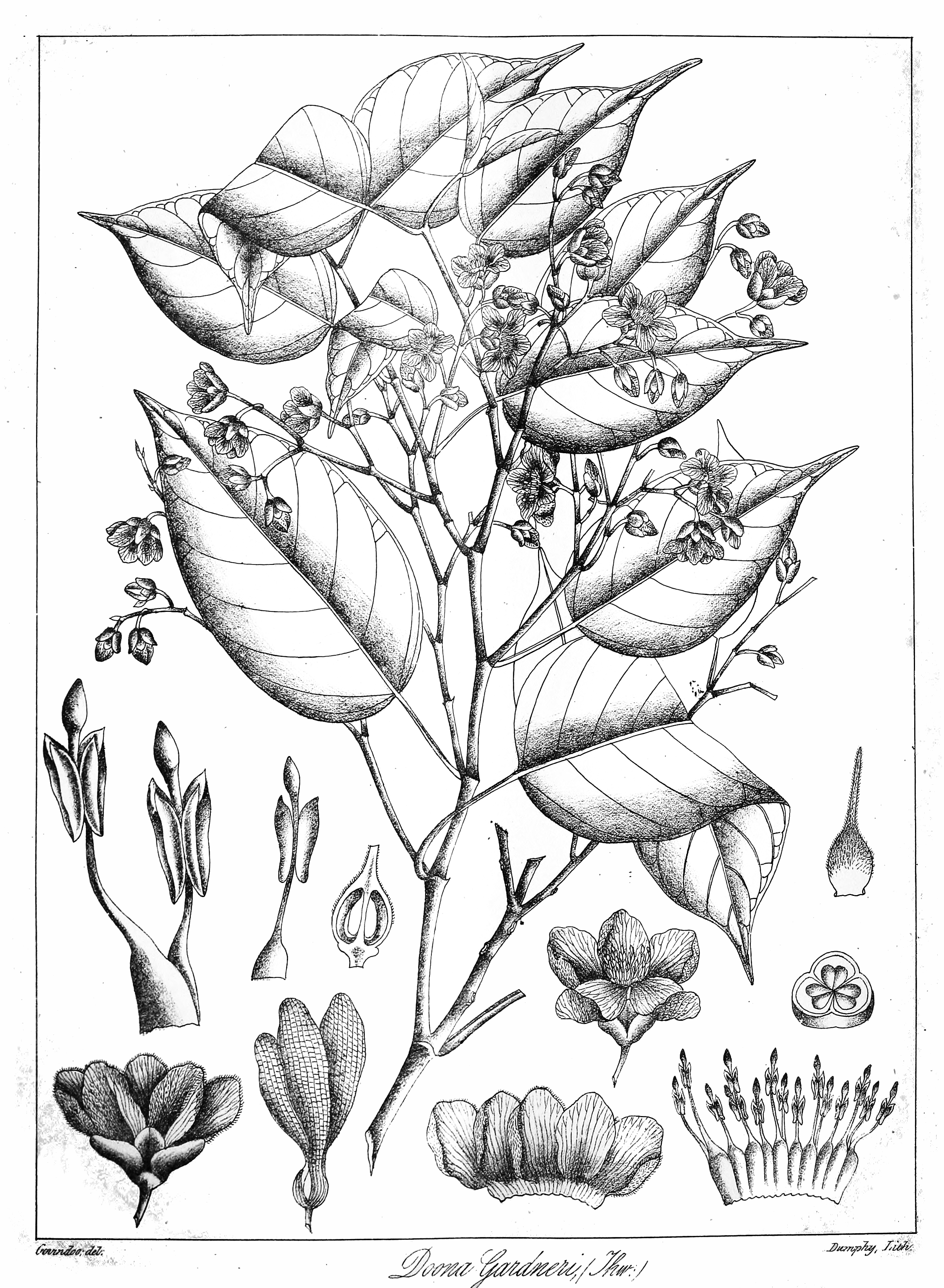

Conservation status
- Vulnerable (IUCN 3.1)

Scientific classification
- Kingdom: Plantae
- Clade: Tracheophytes
- Clade: Angiosperms
- Clade: Eudicots
- Clade: Rosids
- Order: Malvales
- Family: Dipterocarpaceae
- Genus: Doona
- Species: D. gardneri

Binomial name
- Doona gardneri Thwaites

Synonyms
- Shorea gardneri (Thwaites) P.S.Ashton

= Doona gardneri =

Species of flowering plant

Doona gardneri is a species of flowering plant in the family Dipterocarpaceae. It is a tree endemic to Sri Lanka. It is commonly known as red doon in English and rath dun (රත් දුන්) in Sinhalese. It is a large tree native to lower montane rain forest, where it prefers deep, well-drained soils. It grows in disjunct subpopulations at Ensalwatta, Adam's Peak, and Loolkandura at about 1,000 meters elevation.

== Uses ==
Its timber is used for heavy construction.
