= Sphaerotrypes cristatus =

Scientific classification
- Kingdom: Animalia
- Phylum: Arthropoda
- Clade: Pancrustacea
- Class: Insecta
- Order: Coleoptera
- Suborder: Polyphaga
- Infraorder: Cucujiformia
- Superfamily: Curculionoidea
- Family: Curculionidae
- Genus: Sphaerotrypes
- Species: S. cristatus

Binomial name
- Sphaerotrypes cristatus Wood, 1988

Species of beetle

Sphaerotrypes cristatus is a species of weevil found in Sri Lanka. Larval host plants are Calophyllum, Shorea cordifolia, and Vateria copallifera.
