= Doona trapezifolia =

Conservation status
- Vulnerable (IUCN 3.1)

Scientific classification
- Kingdom: Plantae
- Clade: Tracheophytes
- Clade: Angiosperms
- Clade: Eudicots
- Clade: Rosids
- Order: Malvales
- Family: Dipterocarpaceae
- Genus: Doona
- Species: D. trapezifolia

Binomial name
- Doona trapezifolia Thwaites

Synonyms
- Shorea trapezifolia (Thwaites) P.S.Ashton

Species of flowering plant

Doona trapezifolia, known as තිනිය දුන් (tiniya dun) in Sinhala, is a species of flowering plant in the family Dipterocarpaceae. It is a tree endemic to Sri Lanka. It is native to the remaining lowland rain forests and sometimes montane rain forests in southwestern Sri Lanka, usually on deep soils.
