= Doona macrophylla =

Conservation status
- Vulnerable (IUCN 3.1)

Scientific classification
- Kingdom: Plantae
- Clade: Tracheophytes
- Clade: Angiosperms
- Clade: Eudicots
- Clade: Rosids
- Order: Malvales
- Family: Dipterocarpaceae
- Genus: Doona
- Species: D. macrophylla

Binomial name
- Doona macrophylla Thwaites

Synonyms
- Shorea megistophylla P.S.Ashton

Species of flowering plant

Doona macrophylla, synonym Shorea megistophylla, is a species of flowering plant in the family Dipterocarpaceae. It is a tree endemic to Sri Lanka. It is an emergent tree which typically grows by rivers and streams in the remaining lowland wet evergreen rain forest of southwestern Sri Lanka.
