= Doona affinis =

Conservation status
- Vulnerable (IUCN 3.1)

Scientific classification
- Kingdom: Plantae
- Clade: Tracheophytes
- Clade: Angiosperms
- Clade: Eudicots
- Clade: Rosids
- Order: Malvales
- Family: Dipterocarpaceae
- Genus: Doona
- Species: D. affinis

Binomial name
- Doona affinis Thwaites

Synonyms
- Shorea affinis (Thwaites) P.S.Ashton

Species of flowering plant

Doona affinis (synonym Shorea affinis) is a species of flowering plant in the family Dipterocarpaceae. It is a tree endemic to Sri Lanka, where it grows in the remaining lowland rain forests in the island's southwest, often in deep rich soils on hillsides.
