= Doona venulosa =

Conservation status
- Vulnerable (IUCN 3.1)

Scientific classification
- Kingdom: Plantae
- Clade: Tracheophytes
- Clade: Angiosperms
- Clade: Eudicots
- Clade: Rosids
- Order: Malvales
- Family: Dipterocarpaceae
- Genus: Doona
- Species: D. venulosa

Binomial name
- Doona venulosa Thwaites

Synonyms
- Shorea worthingtonii P.S.Ashton

Species of flowering plant

Doona venulosa is a species of plant in the family Dipterocarpaceae. It is a tree endemic to Sri Lanka. It is native to the remaining lowland rain forests of southwestern Sri Lanka, where it grows isolated patches on well-drained soil.
