= Doona disticha =

Conservation status
- Vulnerable (IUCN 3.1)

Scientific classification
- Kingdom: Plantae
- Clade: Tracheophytes
- Clade: Angiosperms
- Clade: Eudicots
- Clade: Rosids
- Order: Malvales
- Family: Dipterocarpaceae
- Genus: Doona
- Species: D. disticha

Binomial name
- Doona disticha (Thwaites) Pierre

Synonyms
- Doona oblonga Thwaites ex Trimen; Shorea disticha (Thwaites) P.S.Ashton; Stemonoporus distichus (Thwaites) F.Heim; Sunaptea disticha (Thwaites) Trimen; Vateria disticha Thwaites; Vatica disticha (Thwaites) A.DC.

Species of flowering plant

Doona disticha is a species of flowering plant in the family Dipterocarpaceae. It is a small tree endemic to Sri Lanka. It is native to the remaining lowland rain forests of southwestern Sri Lanka. It is threatened by overharvesting for timber, and by habitat loss by clearance of forest land for tea plantations.
