= Banknotes of the Sri Lankan rupee =

The banknotes of the Sri Lanka rupee are part of the physical form of Sri Lanka's currency. The issuance of the rupee banknotes began in 1895.

The Government of Ceylon introduced its first paper money in the form of the 5 rupee banknote in 1895. These were followed by 10 rupee notes in 1894, 1000 rupee notes in 1899, 50 rupee notes in 1914, 1 and 2 rupee notes in 1917 and 100 and 500 rupee notes in 1926. In 1942, emergency issues for 5, 10, 25 and 50 cents were introduced and issued until 1949.

In 1951, the Central Bank of Ceylon took over the issuance of paper money, introducing 1 and 10 rupee notes. These were followed in 1952 by 2, 5, 50 and 100 rupee notes. The 1 rupee notes were replaced by coins in 1963.

From 1977, banknotes were issued by the Central Bank of Sri Lanka. 20 rupees notes were introduced in 1979, followed by 500 and 1000 rupees in 1981, 200 rupees in 1998 and 2000 rupees in 2006. Sri Lankan banknotes are unusual in that they are printed vertically on the reverse. In 1998, a 200-rupee note was issued to commemorate the 50th anniversary of independence (1948–1998). This is the first polymer banknote issued in Sri Lanka, and it was printed by Note Printing Australia. All other denominations are printed by the De la Rue Lanka Currency and Securities Print (Pvt) Ltd, a joint venture of the Government of Sri Lanka and De La Rue, a printing company in the United Kingdom.

== Banknotes ==
=== Private Banks ===
==== Verenigde Oostindische Compagnie (United East India Company) ====
Private Series
Image		Value	Description				Key Dates	
Image	Watermark	Value	Obverse	Reverse	Main Color	Dimensions	First Issued	Other Issues
		1 rix dollar					1785	1785-1786
		2 rix dollars						
		3 rix dollars						
		4 rix dollars						
		5 rix dollars						
		10 rix dollars						
		20 rix dollars						
		50 rix dollars						
		100 rix dollars						
		200 rix dollars						
		500 rix dollars						

==== Bank of Ceylon ====
Private Series 3
Image		Value	Description				Key Dates	
Image	Watermark	Value	Obverse	Reverse	Main Color	Dimensions	First Issued	Other Issues
		1 pound					1800s	
		5 pounds						
		10 pounds						
		20 pounds						

==== Asiatic Banking Corporation ====
Private Series 2
Image		Value	Description				Key Dates	
Image	Watermark	Value	Obverse	Reverse	Main Color	Dimensions	First Issued	Other Issues
		10 shillings	Flower	Flower	Green		1865	
		1 pound						
		5 pounds						
		10 pounds						

==== Chartered Mercantile Bank of India, London & China, Colombo / Galley / Kandy ====
Private Series 4
Image		Value	Description				Key Dates	
Image	Watermark	Value	Obverse	Reverse	Main Color	Dimensions	First Issued	Other Issues
		5 rupees					1867	
		10 rupees						
		50 rupees						
		100 rupees						
		500 rupees						
		1000 rupees						

==== Oriental Bank Corporation, Badulla / Colombo / Galley / Jaffna / Kandy / Newera Ellia ====
Private Series 5
Image		Value	Description				Key Dates	
Image	Watermark	Value	Obverse	Reverse	Main Color	Dimensions	First Issued	Other Issues
		5 rupees					1869	1869-1884
		10 rupees						
		50 rupees						
		100 rupees						

=== Government of Ceylon ===
==== Government of Ceylon series, 1885's ====
Government of Ceylon series
Image		Value	Description				Key Dates	
Image	Watermark	Value	Obverse	Reverse	Main Color	Dimensions	First Issued	Other Issues
	Sri Lankan Lion	1 rupee	Flower	Flower	Green		1914	1930, 1939
	Sri Lankan Lion	10 rupees					1914	

Government of Ceylon 2nd series, 1930s

Government of Ceylon series
Image		Value	Description				Key Dates	
Image	Watermark	Value	Obverse	Reverse	Main Color	Dimensions	First Issued	Other Issues
	Sri Lankan Lion	1 rupee	Flower	Flower	Green		1914	1930, 1939
	Sri Lankan Lion	2 rupee	Flower	(Blank)				
	Sri Lankan Lion	10 rupees					1914	
	Sri Lankan Lion	50 rupees						

==== Government of Ceylon 2nd series, 1930s ====
Government of Ceylon series
Image		Value	Description				Key Dates	
Image	Watermark	Value	Obverse	Reverse	Main Color	Dimensions	First Issued	Other Issues
	Sri Lankan Lion	5 cents			Green		1914	1930, 1939
		25 cents						
		50 cents						

==== King George VI series, 1940s ====
King George VI series
Image		Value	Description				Key Dates	
Image	Watermark	Value	Obverse	Reverse	Main Color	Dimensions	First Issued	Other Issues
	Sri Lankan Lion	10 cents	George VI				1942	
	Sri Lankan Lion	25 cents	George VI				1942	
	Sri Lankan Lion	50 cents	George VI				1942	
	Sri Lankan Lion	1 rupee	George VI	Elephant	Green		1942	
	Sri Lankan Lion	2 rupee	George VI					
	Sri Lankan Lion	10 rupees	George VI	Laxapana Waterfall			1942	
	Sri Lankan Lion	100 rupees	George VI				1942	

=== Central Bank Of Sri Lanka ===
==== King George VI 2nd series, 1951 ====
King George VI 2nd series
Image		Value	Description				Key Dates	
Image	Watermark	Value	Obverse	Reverse	Main Color	Dimensions	First Issued	Other Issues
	Sri Lankan Lion	1 rupee	George VI		Blue		1951	
	Sri Lankan Lion	10 rupees	George VI				1951	

==== Queen Elizabeth II series, 1952 ====
Queen Elizabeth II series
Image		Value	Description				Key Dates	
Image	Watermark	Value	Obverse	Reverse	Main Color	Dimensions	First Issued	Other Issues
	Sri Lankan Lion	1 rupee	Elizabeth II		Blue		1952	
	Sri Lankan Lion	2 rupees	Elizabeth II				1952	
,	Sri Lankan Lion	5 rupees	Elizabeth II				1952	
	Sri Lankan Lion	10 rupees	Elizabeth II				1952	
	Sri Lankan Lion	50 rupees	Elizabeth II		Light Blue		1952	
	Sri Lankan Lion	100 rupees	Elizabeth II				1952	

==== Armorial Ensign of Ceylon series, 1956 ====
Armorial Ensign of Ceylon series
Image		Value	Description				Key Dates	
Image	Watermark	Value	Obverse	Reverse	Main Color	Dimensions	First Issued	Other Issues
	Sri Lankan Lion	1 rupee	Coat of arms		Light blue		1956	1956-1963
	Sri Lankan Lion	2 rupees	Coat of arms		Dark red		1956	1956-1963
	Sri Lankan Lion	5 rupees	Coat of arms		Bright red		1956	1956-1963
	Sri Lankan Lion	10 rupees	Coat of arms		Green		1956	1956-1963
	Sri Lankan Lion	50 rupees	Coat of arms		Blue		1956	1956-1963
	Sri Lankan Lion	100 rupees	Coat of arms		Olive		1956	1956-1963

==== S. W. R. D. Bandaranaike Portrait series, 1962 ====
S. W. R. D. Bandaranaike Portrait series
Image		Value	Description				Key Dates	
Image	Watermark	Value	Obverse	Reverse	Main Color	Dimensions	First Issued	Other Issues
	Sri Lankan Lion	2 rupees	S. W. R. D. Bandaranaike				1962	1962-1965
	Sri Lankan Lion	5 rupees	S. W. R. D. Bandaranaike				1962	1962-1965
	Sri Lankan Lion	10 rupees	S. W. R. D. Bandaranaike			Green	1962	1962-1965
	Sri Lankan Lion	50 rupees	S. W. R. D. Bandaranaike			Purple, light green	1962	1962-1965
	Sri Lankan Lion	100 rupees	S. W. R. D. Bandaranaike				1962	1962-1965

==== King Parakramabahu Series, 1965 ====
King Parakramabahu Series
Image		Value	Description				Key Dates	
Image	Watermark	Value	Obverse	Reverse	Main Color	Dimensions	First Issued	Other Issues
,	Sri Lankan Lion	2 rupees	Parakramabahu I				1965	1965-1977
,	Sri Lankan Lion	5 rupees	Parakramabahu I		Orange-Red		1969	1965-1977
,	Sri Lankan Lion	10 rupees	Parakramabahu I		Green		1969	1965-1977
,	Sri Lankan Lion	50 rupees	Parakramabahu I				1967	1965-1977
,	Sri Lankan Lion	100 rupees	Parakramabahu I				1965	1965-1977

==== S. W. R. D. Bandaranaike 2nd Series, 1970 ====
S. W. R. D. Bandaranaike Series
Image		Value	Description				Key Dates	
Image	Watermark	Value	Obverse	Reverse	Main Color	Dimensions	First Issued	Other Issues
	Sri Lankan Lion	50 rupees	S. W. R. D. Bandaranaike		Blue		1970	
	Sri Lankan Lion	100 rupees	S. W. R. D. Bandaranaike		Red		1970	

==== S. W. R. D. Bandaranaike 3rd Series, 1971 ====
S. W. R. D. Bandaranaike Series
Image		Value	Description				Key Dates	
Image	Watermark	Value	Obverse	Reverse	Main Color	Dimensions	First Issued	Other Issues
	50 rupees		Purple	S. W. R. D. Bandaranaike		1971	1971-1974	Sri Lankan Lion
	100 rupees			S. W. R. D. Bandaranaike		1971		Sri Lankan Lion

==== Armorial Ensign of Sri Lanka series, 1975 ====
Armorial Ensign of Sri Lanka series
Image		Value	Description				Key Dates	
Image	Watermark	Value	Obverse	Reverse	Main Color	Dimensions	First Issued	Other Issues
	50 rupees		Light purple	Emblem	Terraced hillside	26 August 1977	1977	Sri Lankan Lion
	100 rupees		Light purple, gray	Emblem	26 August 1977	1977	1975	Sri Lankan Lion

==== Fauna and Flora Series, 1979 ====
Fauna and Flora Series
Image		Value	Description				Key Dates	
Image	Watermark	Value	Obverse	Reverse	Main Color	Dimensions	First Issued	Other Issues
	Sri Lankan Lion	2 rupees	Fish		Red		26 March 1979	1979
	Sri Lankan Lion	5 rupees	Butterfly and Lizard		Purple		26 March 1979	1979
	Sri Lankan Lion	10 rupees			Green		26 March 1979	1979
	Sri Lankan Lion	20 rupees	Bird		Brown		26 March 1979	1979
	Sri Lankan Lion	50 rupees			Blue		26 March 1979	1979
	Sri Lankan Lion	100 rupees			Orange		26 March 1979	1979

==== Historical and Archaeological series, 1981 ====
Historical and Archaeological series
Image		Value	Description				Key Dates	
Image	Watermark	Value	Obverse	Reverse	Main Color	Dimensions	First Issued	Other Issues
	Sri Lankan Lion	5 rupees			Red		1982	1 January 1982
	Sri Lankan Lion	10 rupees	Temple of the Sacred Tooth Relic		Green		1982	1 January 1982; 1 January 1985
	Sri Lankan Lion	20 rupees	Moonstone		Purple		1982	1 January 1982; 1 January 1985
	Sri Lankan Lion	50 rupees			Blue		1982	1 January 1982
	Sri Lankan Lion	100 rupees			Orange		1982	1 January 1982
	Sri Lankan Lion	500 rupees			Light brown		1981	1 January 1981; 1 January 1985
	Sri Lankan Lion	1000 rupees		Dam	Light green		1981	1 January 1981; 1 January 1985

==== Historical and Development series, 1987 ====
Historical and Development series
Image		Value	Description				Key Dates	
Image	Watermark	Value	Obverse	Reverse	Main Color	Dimensions	First Issued	Other Issues
	Sri Lankan Lion	10 rupees	Temple of the Sacred Tooth Relic		Green		1987	1 January 1987; 21 November 1988; 21 February 1989; 5 April 1990
	Sri Lankan Lion	20 rupees	Moonstone		Purple		1988	21 November 1988; 21 February 1989; 5 April 1990
	Sri Lankan Lion	50 rupees			Blue		1988	21 November 1988; 21 February 1989; 5 April 1990
	Sri Lankan Lion	100 rupees			Orange		1987	1 January 1987; 21 November 1988; 21 February 1989; 5 April 1990
	Sri Lankan Lion	500 rupees			Light brown		1987	1 January 1987; 21 November 1988; 21 February 1989; 5 April 1990
	Sri Lankan Lion	1000 rupees	Dam	Peacock, mountains	Light green		1987	1 January 1987; 21 February 1989; 5 April 1990

==== Sri Lanka Heritage series, 1991, 2005 ====
The Heritage Series saw many revisions throughout its life since 1991 up to 2010. The 1995 revision had an enhanced latent image at the center bottom of obverse sides. The 2001 revision added wider metallic strip to the 500 and 1000 rupee notes.

Sri Lanka Heritage series (Series currently in Circulation)
Image	Value	Dimensions	Color	Issued dates	Watermark
, ,	10 rupees		Green	1 January 1991; 1 July 1992; 19 August 1994; 15 November 1995; 12 December 2001; 10 April 2004; 1 July 2004; 19 November 2005; 3 July 2006	A lion holding a sword
, ,	20 rupees	128 X 63 mm	Purple	1 January 1991; 1 July 1992; 19 August 1994; 15 November 1995; 12 December 2001; 10 April 2004; 1 July 2004; 19 November 2005; 3 July 2006	A lion holding a sword
, ,	50 rupees		Blue	1 January 1991; 1 July 1992; 19 August 1994; 15 November 1995; 12 December 2001; 10 April 2004; 1 July 2004; 19 November 2005; 3 July 2006	A lion holding a sword
, , ,	100 rupees	143 X 71 mm	Orange	1 January 1991; 1 July 1992; 19 August 1994; 15 November 1995; 12 December 2001; 10 April 2004; 1 July 2004; 19 November 2005; 3 July 2006	A lion holding a sword
, ,	500 rupees		Light orange and purple	1 January 1991; 1 July 1992; 19 August 1994; 15 November 1995; 12 December 2001; 10 April 2004; 1 July 2004; 19 November 2005; 3 July 2006	A lion holding a sword
, ,	1000 rupees	158 X 79 mm	Light green	1 January 1991; 1 July 1992; 19 August 1994; 15 November 1995; 12 December 2001; 10 April 2004; 1 July 2004; 19 November 2005; 3 July 2006	A lion holding a sword
	2000 rupees		Orange and Pink	2 November 2005; 3 July 2006	A lion holding a sword

==== Development, Prosperity and Sri Lanka Dancers series, 2010 ====
To celebrate its 60th anniversary, the Central Bank of Sri Lanka issued a new series of banknotes on 4 February 2011. The series was designed by two Sri Lankan artists selected from an island-wide competition. The themes of the new notes are Development and Prosperity, and Sri Lankan Dancers. The fronts of the new notes bear artistic impressions of selected development projects in Sri Lanka and native birds and butterflies. The backs depict Sri Lankan traditional dancers and guard stones in a background of a map of Sri Lanka. This new family does not include a 10-rupee note because that denomination was replaced by a coin on 5 April 2010.

Development, Prosperity and Sri Lanka Dancers (Series currently in Circulation)
Image	Value	Dimensions	Color	Issued dates	Watermark
	20 rupees	128 x 67 mm	Pink	1 January 2010; 4 February 2015	Serendib scops owl
	50 rupees	133 x 67 mm	Blue	1 January 2010; 4 February 2015	Dull-blue flycatcher
	100 rupees	138 x 67 mm	Orange	1 January 2010; 4 February 2015	Orange-billed babbler
	500 rupees	143 x 67 mm	Purple	1 January 2010; 4 February 2015	Layard's parakeet
	1000 rupees	148 x 67 mm	Green	1 January 2010; 4 February 2015	Sri Lanka Hanging parrot
	5000 rupees	153 x 67 mm	Brown	1 January 2010; 4 February 2015	Yellow-eared bulbul

On 5 April 2010 Sri Lanka replaced the 10 rupee note with a coin.

== Commemorative notes ==
The Central Bank of Sri Lanka has issued five commemorative notes in recognition of significant events of national importance. In 1998 a 200 rupee note was issued on Independence day to commemorate the 50th Independence Anniversary of the country. In 2009 a 1000 rupee note was issued commemorating the end of the Sri Lankan Civil War and the Ushering of Peace and Prosperity. In 2013 a 500 rupee note was issued for Commonwealth Heads of Government Meeting 2013 held in Sri Lanka.

== See also ==
- Coins of the Sri Lankan rupee
