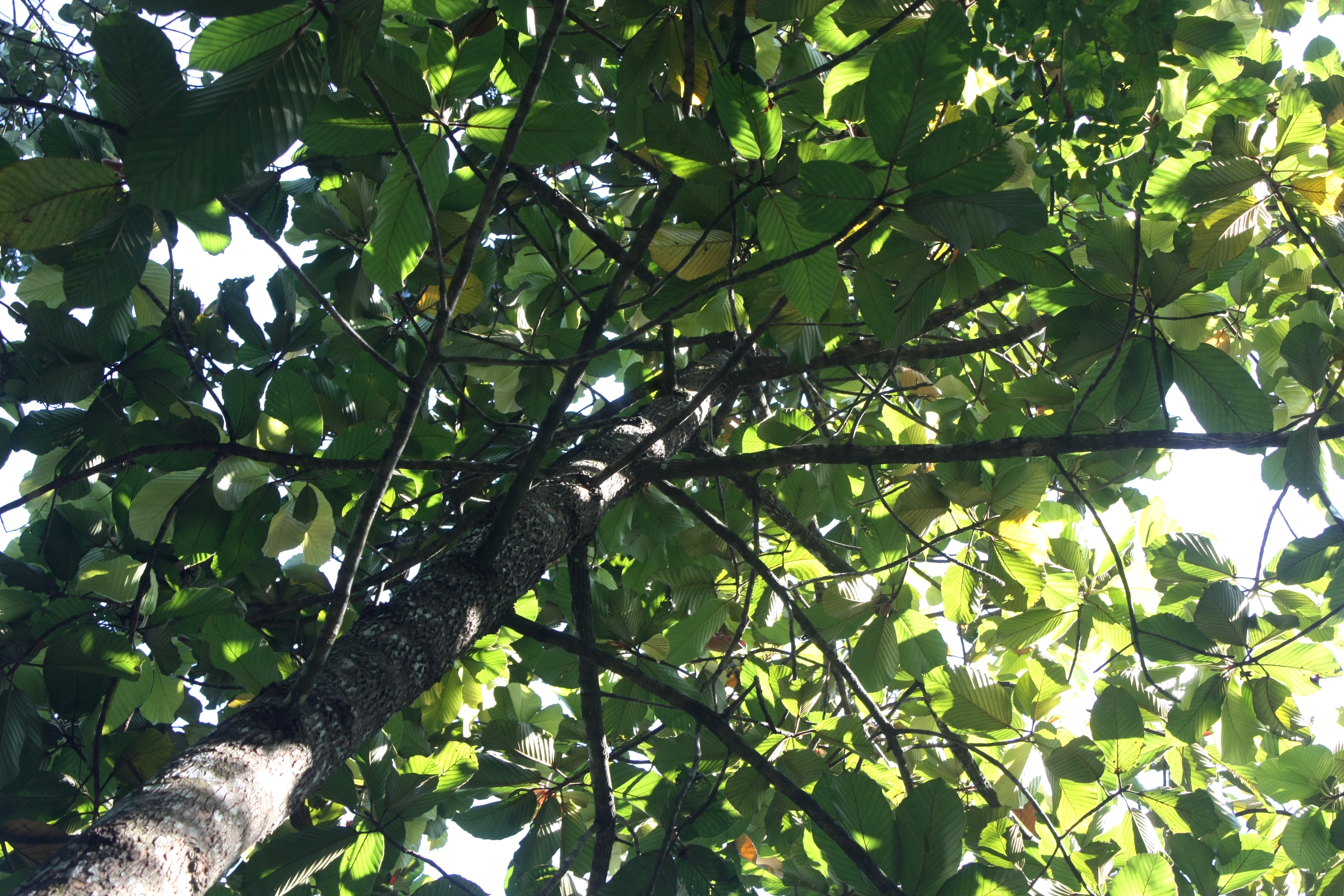

Conservation status
- Critically Endangered (IUCN 2.3)

Scientific classification
- Kingdom: Plantae
- Clade: Tracheophytes
- Clade: Angiosperms
- Clade: Eudicots
- Clade: Rosids
- Order: Malvales
- Family: Dipterocarpaceae
- Genus: Dipterocarpus
- Species: D. hispidus

Binomial name
- Dipterocarpus hispidus Thwaites

Synonyms
- Dipterocarpus oblongus A.DC.

= Dipterocarpus hispidus =

Species of tree

Dipterocarpus hispidus is a species of flowering plant in the family Dipterocarpaceae. It is a tree endemic to southwestern Sri Lanka, where it grows in lowland rain forest.

The species was first described by George Henry Kendrick Thwaites in 1858.

== Flowers ==
Inflorescence - hardly branched raceme.

== Uses ==
Wood - construction timber, plywood.

== Culture ==
Known as බූ හොර (bu hora) in Sinhala.
