= Doona cordifolia =

Conservation status
- Vulnerable (IUCN 3.1)

Scientific classification
- Kingdom: Plantae
- Clade: Tracheophytes
- Clade: Angiosperms
- Clade: Eudicots
- Clade: Rosids
- Order: Malvales
- Family: Dipterocarpaceae
- Genus: Doona
- Species: D. cordifolia

Binomial name
- Doona cordifolia Thwaites

Synonyms
- Caryolobis indica Gaertn.; Doona nervosa Thwaites; Shorea cordifolia (Thwaites) P.S.Ashton

Species of flowering plant

Doona cordifolia is a species of flowering plant in the family Dipterocarpaceae. It is a tree endemic to Sri Lanka, commonly known as red doon. It is native to southwestern Sri Lanka, where it is a canopy tree in remaining lowland humid evergreen rain forest.
