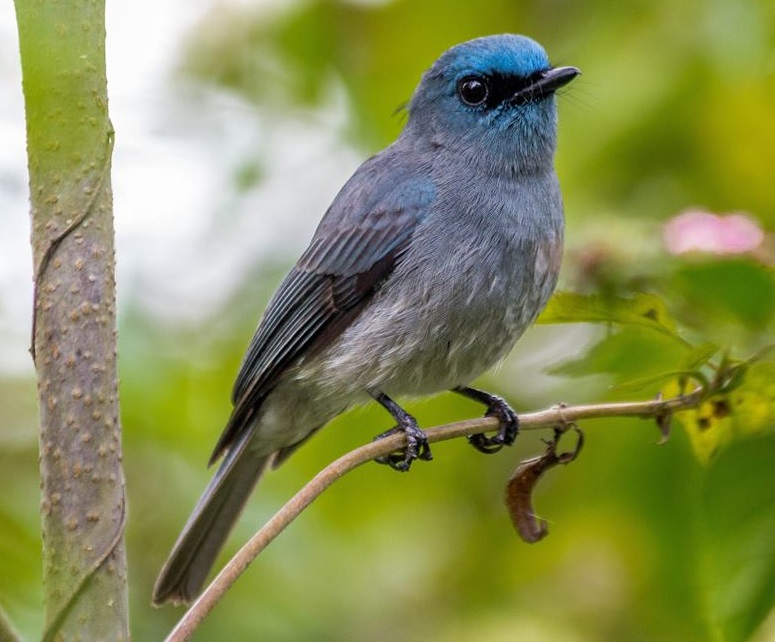

Conservation status
- Near Threatened (IUCN 3.1)

Scientific classification
- Kingdom: Animalia
- Phylum: Chordata
- Class: Aves
- Order: Passeriformes
- Family: Muscicapidae
- Genus: Eumyias
- Species: E. sordidus

Binomial name
- Eumyias sordidus (Walden, 1870)

Synonyms
- Eumyias sordida; Stoparola sordida

= Dull-blue flycatcher =

Species of bird

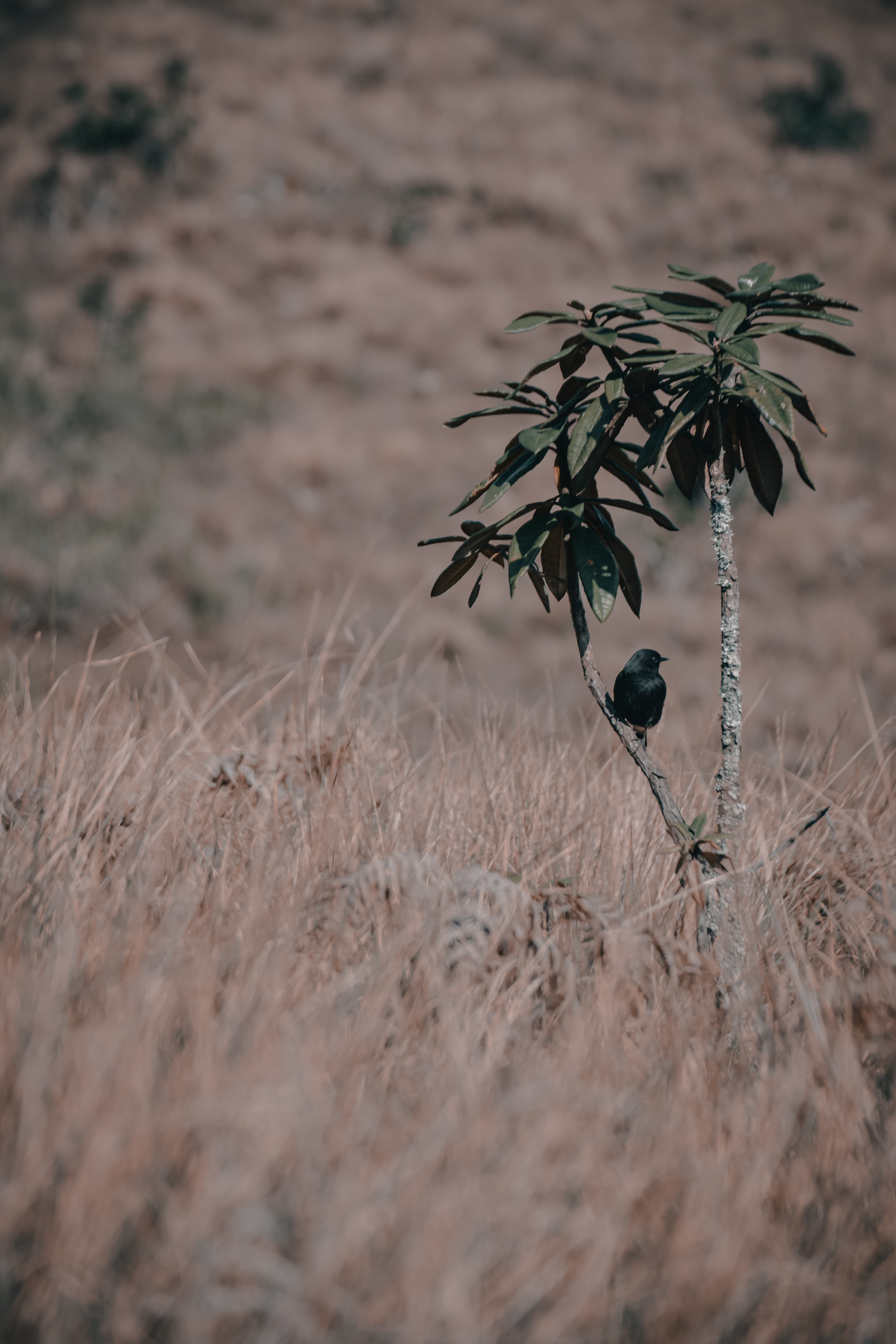
Horton Plains National Park is a national park in the central highlands of Sri Lanka

The dull-blue flycatcher (Eumyias sordidus) is a small passerine bird in the flycatcher family, Muscicapidae. This species is an endemic resident breeder in the hills of central Sri Lanka.

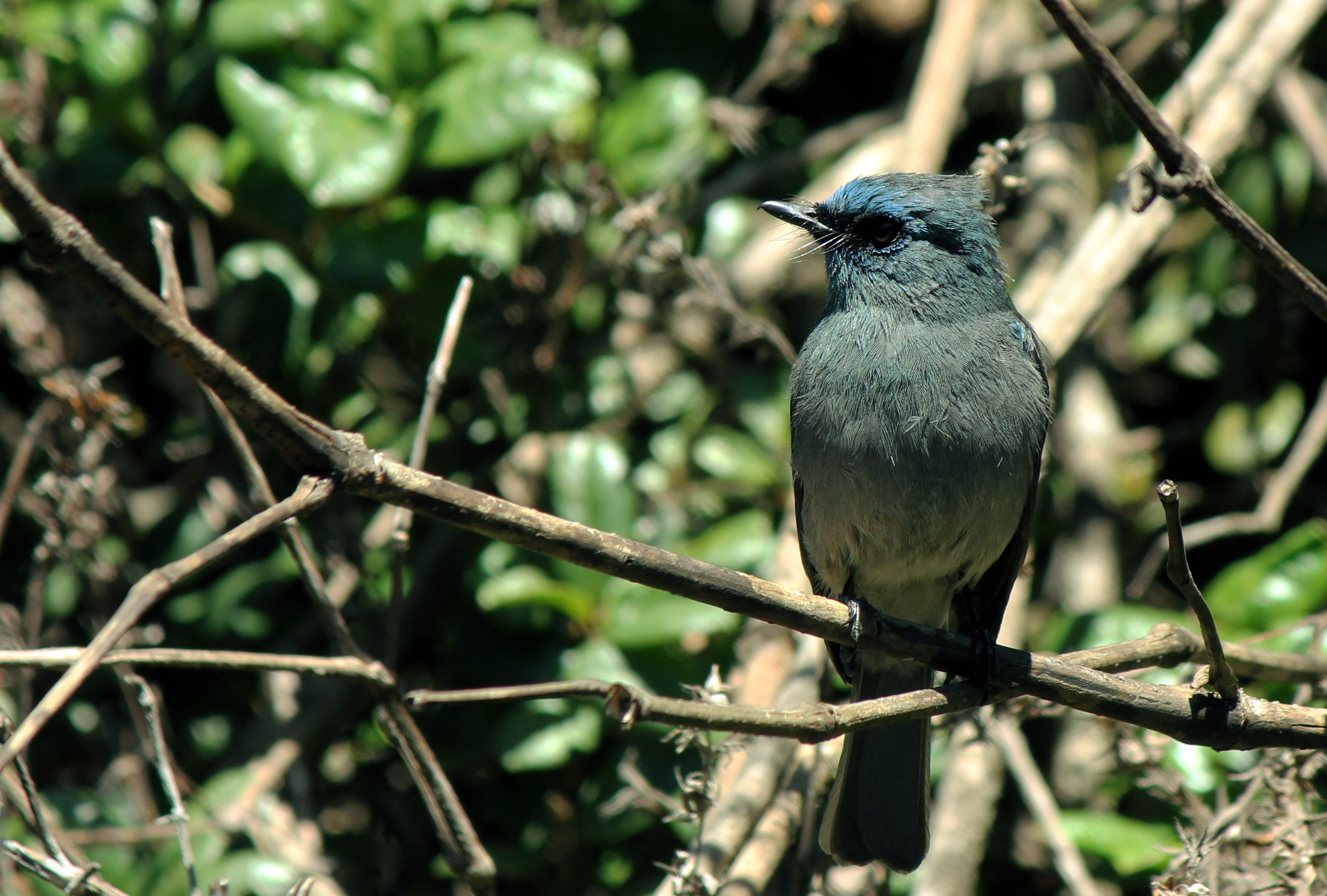

== Taxonomy ==
It was previously included in the genus Muscicapa.

== Description ==
This species is 15 cm (5.9 in) long. It is similar in shape to the spotted flycatcher and has a loud melodic song.. Adults are ashy blue, with a whitish belly. There is a black patch between the broad black bill and the eye, bordered with brighter blue above and below. Sexes are similar, but females are slightly duller.

Juvenile dull-blue flycatchers are brown, heavily spotted on the head, back, wing-coverts and breast with pale buff; their flight feathers are broadly edged with blue-grey.

== Ecology ==
The dull-blue flycatcher breeds in deciduous mountain forest, invariably above 600 m (2,000 ft), although it is not common below 900 m (3,000 ft). The main breeding season is in March and April, but a second brood is often reared later in the year.

The cup-shaped nest is a lined compact mass of moss. The site is usually a well-shaded rock ledge. The normal clutch is two or three brown-spotted pink eggs are laid.

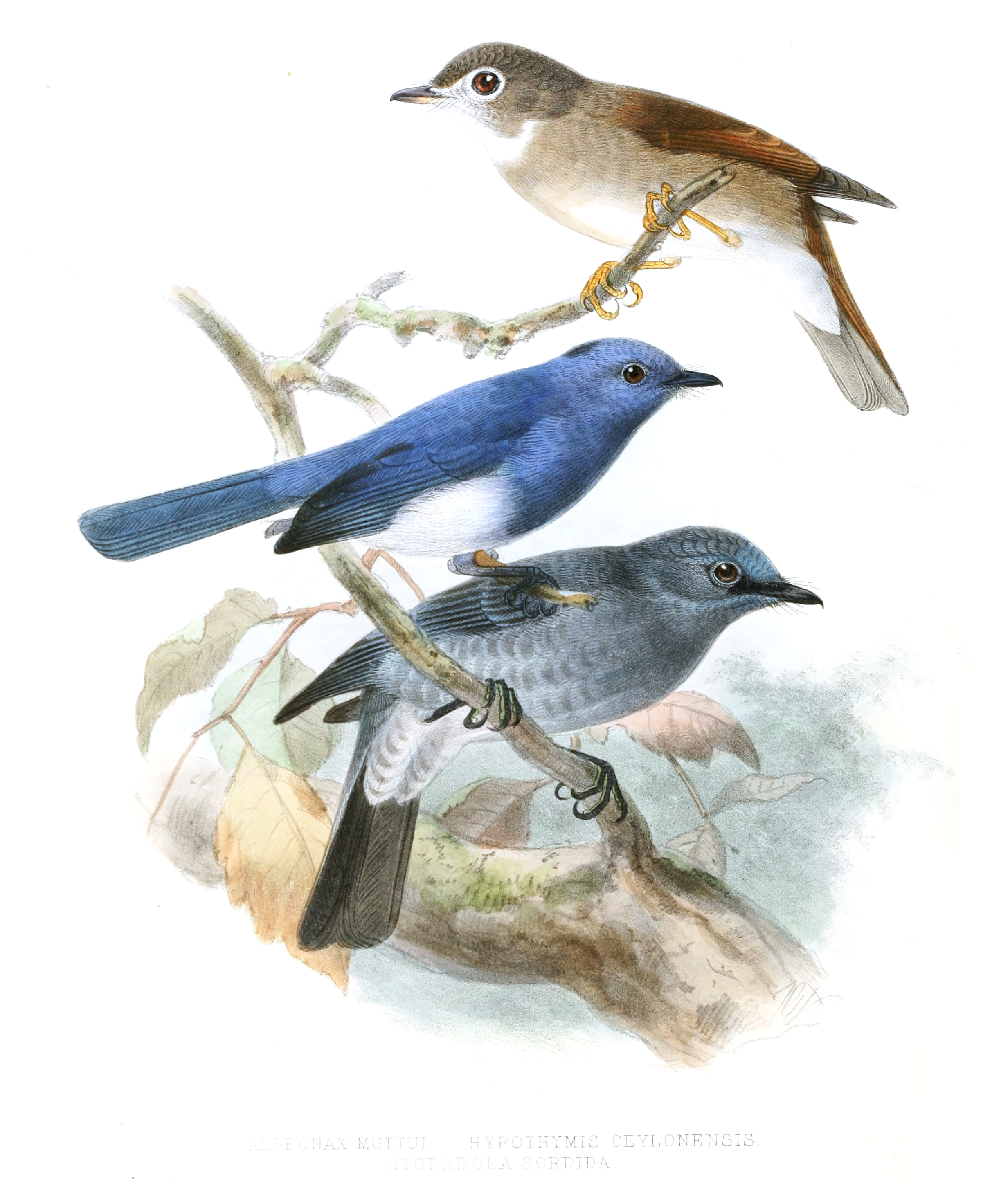
Dull-blue flycatcher (below) with brown-breasted flycatcher and black-naped monarch

This is relatively easy bird to see, despite its forest habitat. It feeds mainly on flying insects, beetles, caterpillars and other insects, but also eats berries.

== In Culture ==
This bird appears in 50 Sri Lankan rupee bank note (2010 series).
