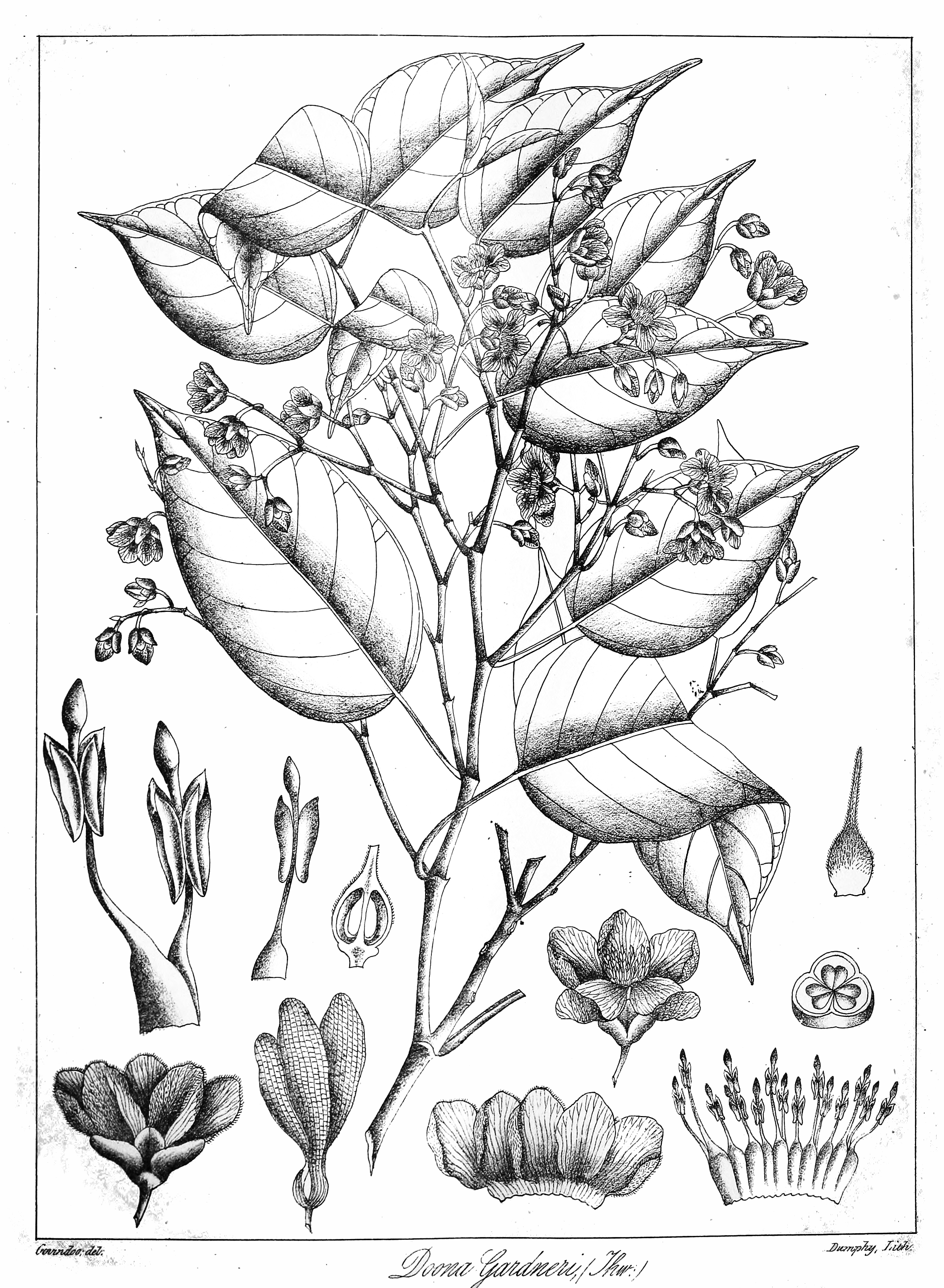
- Doona gardneri

Scientific classification
- Kingdom: Plantae
- Clade: Tracheophytes
- Clade: Angiosperms
- Clade: Eudicots
- Clade: Rosids
- Order: Malvales
- Family: Dipterocarpaceae
- Tribe: Shoreae
- Genus: Doona; Thwaites (1851)

Species
- 10; see text

= Doona (plant) =

Genus of tropical trees

Doona is a genus of flowering plants in the family Dipterocarpaceae. It includes ten species of trees endemic to Sri Lanka.

== Species ==
Ten species are accepted.

- Doona affinis Thwaites
- Doona congestiflora Thwaites
- Doona cordifolia Thwaites
- Doona disticha (Thwaites) Pierre
- Doona gardneri Thwaites
- Doona macrophylla Thwaites
- Doona ovalifolia Thwaites
- Doona trapezifolia Thwaites
- Doona venulosa Thwaites
- Doona zeylanica Thwaites
