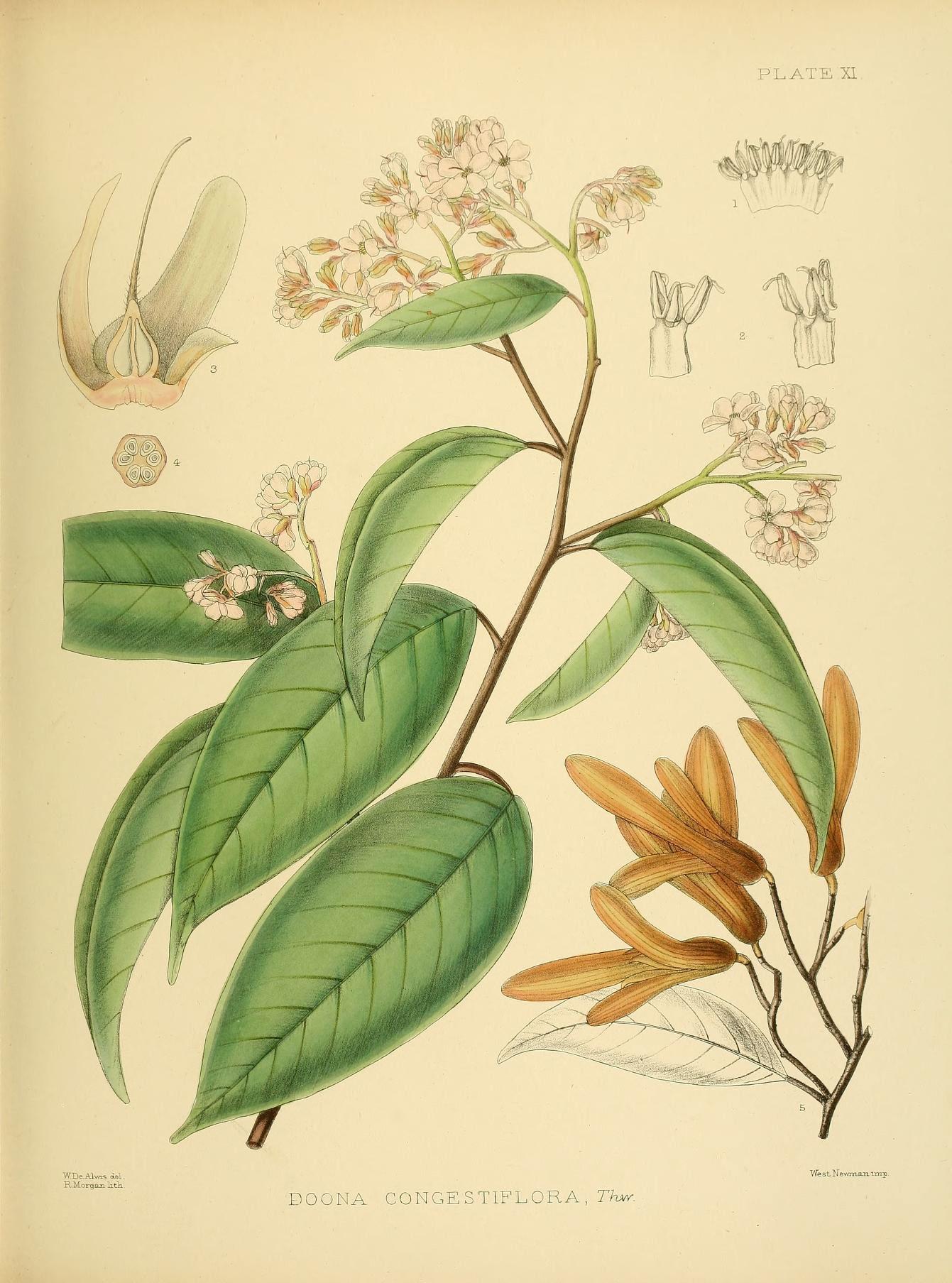

Conservation status
- Vulnerable (IUCN 3.1)

Scientific classification
- Kingdom: Plantae
- Clade: Tracheophytes
- Clade: Angiosperms
- Clade: Eudicots
- Clade: Rosids
- Order: Malvales
- Family: Dipterocarpaceae
- Genus: Doona
- Species: D. congestiflora

Binomial name
- Doona congestiflora Thwaites

Synonyms
- Shorea congestiflora (Thwaites) P.S.Ashton

= Doona congestiflora =

Species of flowering plant

Doona congestiflora is a species of flowering plant in the family Dipterocarpaceae. It is a tree endemic to Sri Lanka.
