= Jungle shrew =

Conservation status
- Endangered (IUCN 3.1)

Scientific classification
- Kingdom: Animalia
- Phylum: Chordata
- Class: Mammalia
- Order: Eulipotyphla
- Family: Soricidae
- Genus: Suncus
- Species: S. zeylanicus

Binomial name
- Suncus zeylanicus Phillips, 1928
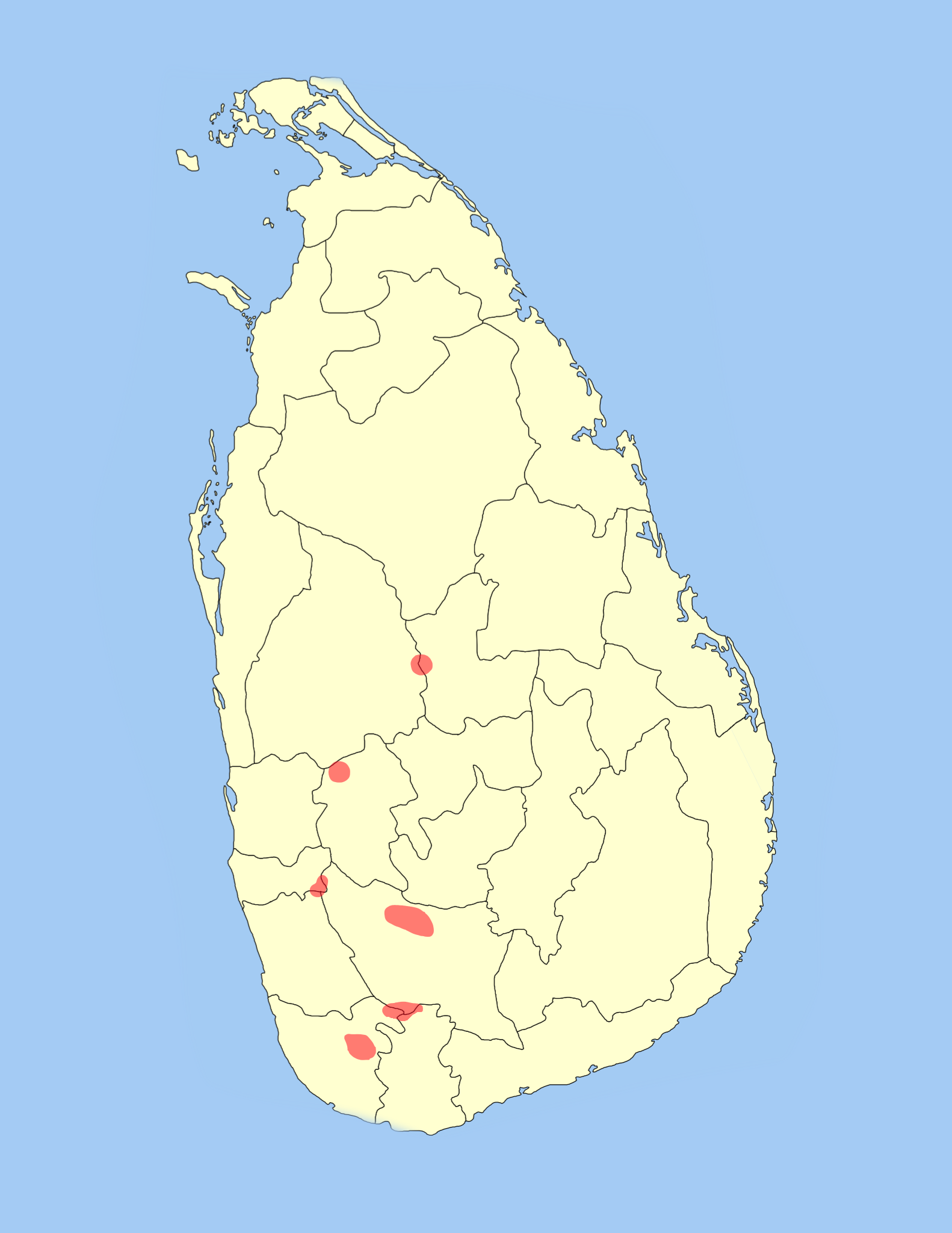
- Jungle shrew range

Species of mammal

The jungle shrew (Suncus zeylanicus), also known as Sri Lankan shrew, is a species of mammal in the family Soricidae endemic to Sri Lanka. Its natural habitat is subtropical or tropical dry forests. It is threatened by habitat loss.

== Description ==
Its head and body are 10–12 cm (3.9–4.7 in) long, with an 8–9 cm (3.1–3.5 in) tail. Its pelage is dark gray above, and lighter in the underparts. Hairs appear dark at the base and lighter at the tip. The tail is short and gray, sometimes with a white tip.

== Distribution ==
This species is endemic to Sri Lanka, where it is known from several distinctly fragmented locations across the Central, Western, and Sabaragamuwa provinces. Its known range was extended further south with confirmed records from the Sinharaja and Kanneliya forests. It occurs at elevations ranging from 150 to approximately 1,000 meters above sea level.

Despite this relatively broad distribution, the species appears to be rare. Recent surveys involving over 2,000 night traps in its known range, including the type locality of Kitulgala, failed to record any individuals, with only a single specimen confirmed from Sinharaja in recent years.

== Ecology ==
This shrew is nocturnal, crepuscular, and terrestrial. It is a specialist of lowland wet zone rainforests and is thought to be insectivorous. Its absence from abandoned lands and plantation woodlands within its forest range indicates a high susceptibility to habitat loss and land conversion, likely contributing to its fragmented and rare status.
