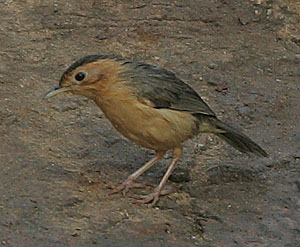

Conservation status
- Least Concern (IUCN 3.1)

Scientific classification
- Kingdom: Animalia
- Phylum: Chordata
- Class: Aves
- Order: Passeriformes
- Family: Pellorneidae
- Genus: Pellorneum
- Species: P. fuscocapillus

Binomial name
- Pellorneum fuscocapillus (Blyth, 1849)

= Brown-capped babbler =

Species of bird

The brown-capped babbler (Pellorneum fuscocapillus) is a member of the family Pellorneidae.

== Distribution ==
The brown-capped babbler is an endemic resident breeding bird in Sri Lanka. Its habitat is forest undergrowth and thick scrub. This species, like most babblers, is not migratory, and has short rounded wings and a weak flight.

== Ecology ==
This babbler builds its nest on the ground or in a hole, concealed in dense masses of foliage. The normal clutch is two or three eggs.

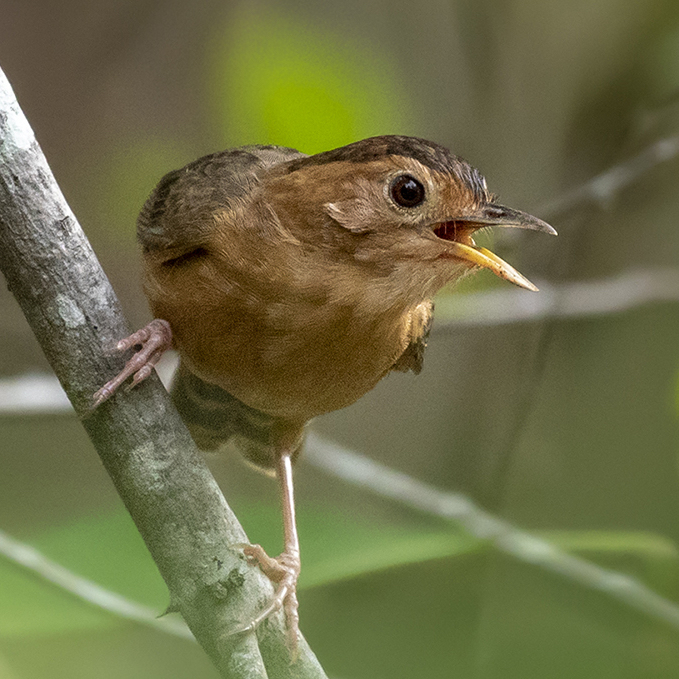

== Description ==
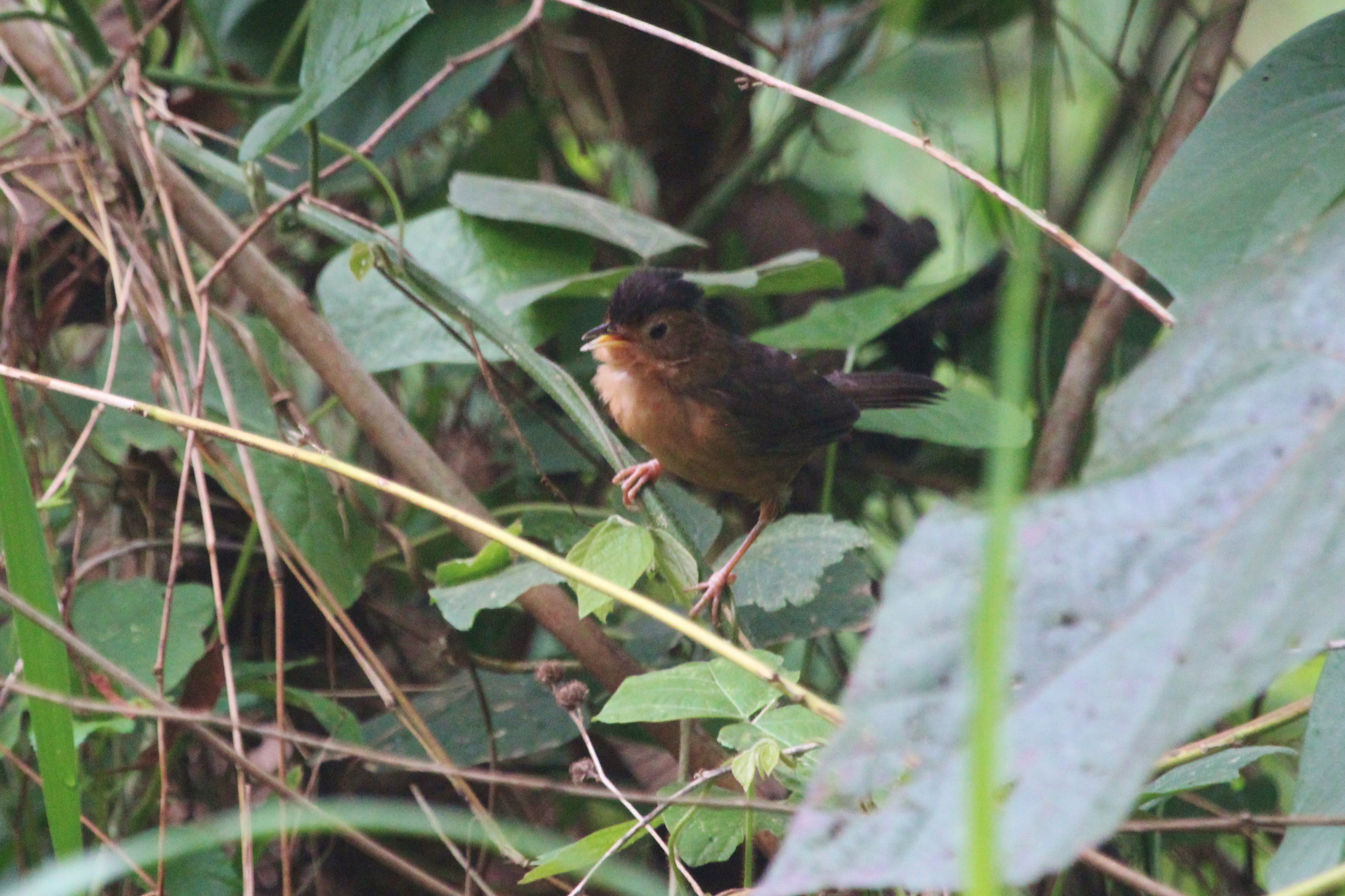
A brown-capped babbler that was found near the Kitulgala Police Station, Sri Lanka.

The brown-capped babbler is a smallish to medium-sized babbler, at 16 cm (6.3 in) including its long tail. It is brown above and rich cinnamon below. It has a dark brown crown.

Brown-capped babblers have short dark bills. Their food is mainly insects. They can be difficult to observe in the dense vegetation they prefer, but like other babblers, these are noisy birds, and their characteristic calls are often the best indication that these birds are present.

== Behavior ==
Brown-capped babblers are usually believed to occur in pairs. Male birds make a distinctive call ("pretty dear") to attract other birds. Breeding season occurs during the first half of the year, during which time males exhibit territorial behavior.

== In culture ==
In Sri Lanka, this bird is known as parandel-kurulla (translates to 'dried-grass(colored) bird') or redi diang (onomatopoeic in origin) in Sinhala language. Brown-capped babbler appears in a 4 rupee Sri Lankan postal stamp,

== Subspecies ==
Three subspecies found.

- P. f. babaulti (T. Wells, 1919) - low country dry zone
- P. f. fuscocapillus (Blyth, 1849) - hill country
- P. f. scotillum (Blyth, 1849) - low country wet zone
