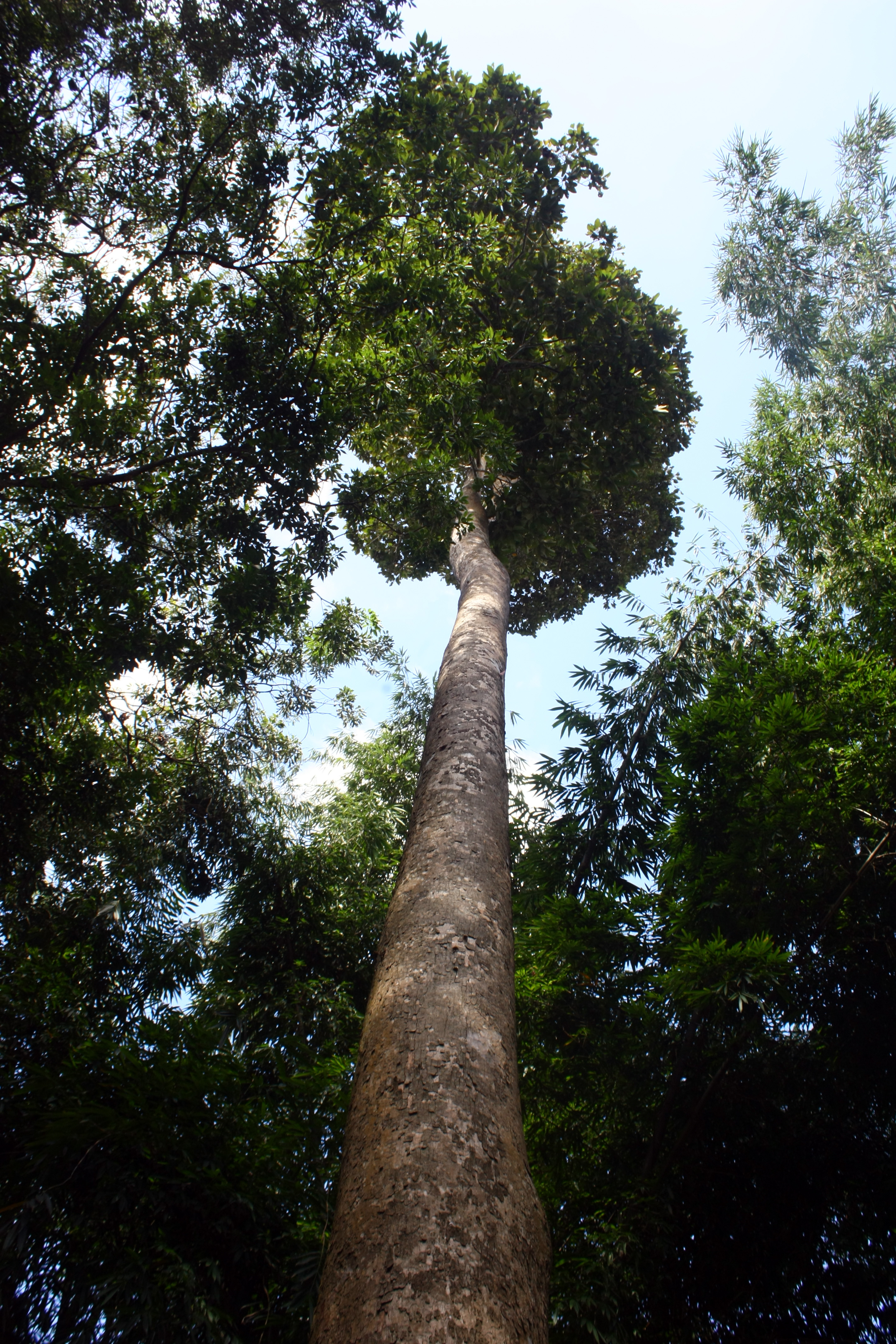
- In Peradeniya Botanical Gardens, Sri Lanka

Conservation status
- Near Threatened (IUCN 3.1)

Scientific classification
- Kingdom: Plantae
- Clade: Tracheophytes
- Clade: Angiosperms
- Clade: Eudicots
- Clade: Rosids
- Order: Malvales
- Family: Dipterocarpaceae
- Genus: Dipterocarpus
- Species: D. zeylanicus

Binomial name
- Dipterocarpus zeylanicus Thwaites

= Dipterocarpus zeylanicus =

Species of flowering plant

Dipterocarpus zeylanicus, commonly known as හොර - Hora in Sinhalese and සරල - Sarala or කිරිපලු - Kiripalu, is a species of Dipterocarpus that is endemic to Sri Lanka. A closely related Indian species is Dipterocarpus turbinatus. The Sri Lankan tree is a large tree that grows up to 40–45 m (131–148 ft) tall and 4–6 m (13–20 ft) in circumference. The bark is light pinkish brown or light yellowish brown. Leaves are big and oval, 5 to 8 inches (13 to 20 cm) long. The sharp-edged leaves are covered with silver hairs. Flowers bloom in April and seeds have two wings to spread from wind. The bark contains considerable amounts of gray colour oleoresin. D. zeylanicus can be found in moist low country like Ratnapura, Kaluthara, Galle and Matara Districts and also in the Sinharaja rain forest. The tallest (nearly 60 m (200 ft)) trees of Hora in Sri Lanka are found in Udakiruwa village in Lunugala and under great threat of legal/illegal felling. There are many place names which begin with the name of the Hora tree. Even Tamil place names like Norochcholai (where a controversial coal power plant in Sri Lanka is located) is said to refer to a clump of Hora trees - i.e., "Horagolla" in Sinhalese.

It is used as a strong and hard wood and a weight of 54 lb/cu ft (0.86 g/cm^{3}). The heartwood is light pinkish to dark reddish brown. After a preservative treatment, it is used for railway sleepers, rafters, electric posts, beams, joists, heavy types of carpentry work, and eminently suitable for underwater work.

In Theravada Buddhism, the tree is said to have played the role of the Bodhi tree for a Buddha of a previous epoch, viz., the thirteenth Buddha known as "Padumuththara - පදුමුත්තර".

== Gallery ==

Fruits

Leaf

Leaf

Leaves

Leaves and flowers

Flower

Flowers
