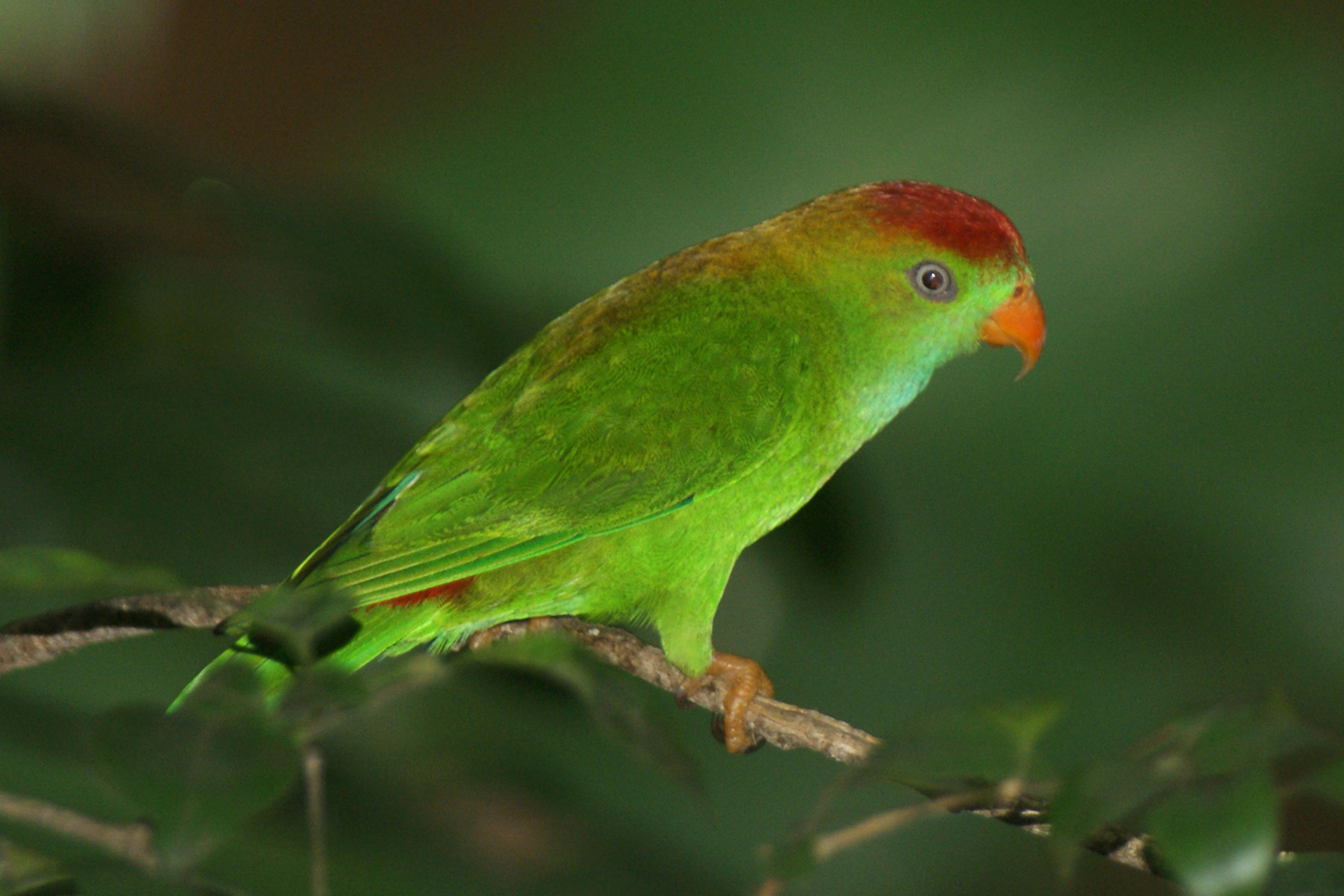
- Adult in Sri Lanka
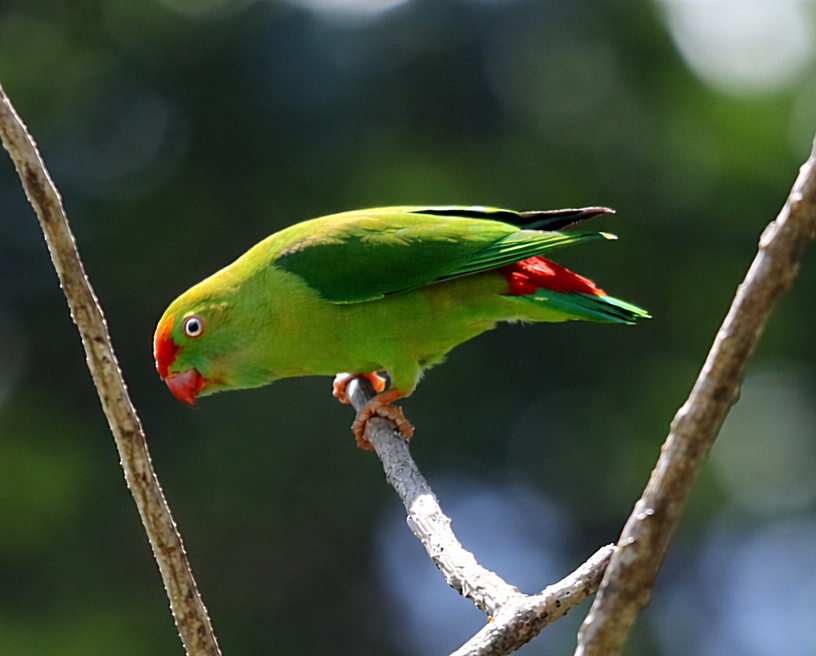
- from Riverston, Matale

Conservation status
- Least Concern (IUCN 3.1)

Scientific classification
- Kingdom: Animalia
- Phylum: Chordata
- Class: Aves
- Order: Psittaciformes
- Family: Psittaculidae
- Genus: Loriculus
- Species: L. beryllinus

Binomial name
- Loriculus beryllinus (Pennant, 1781)
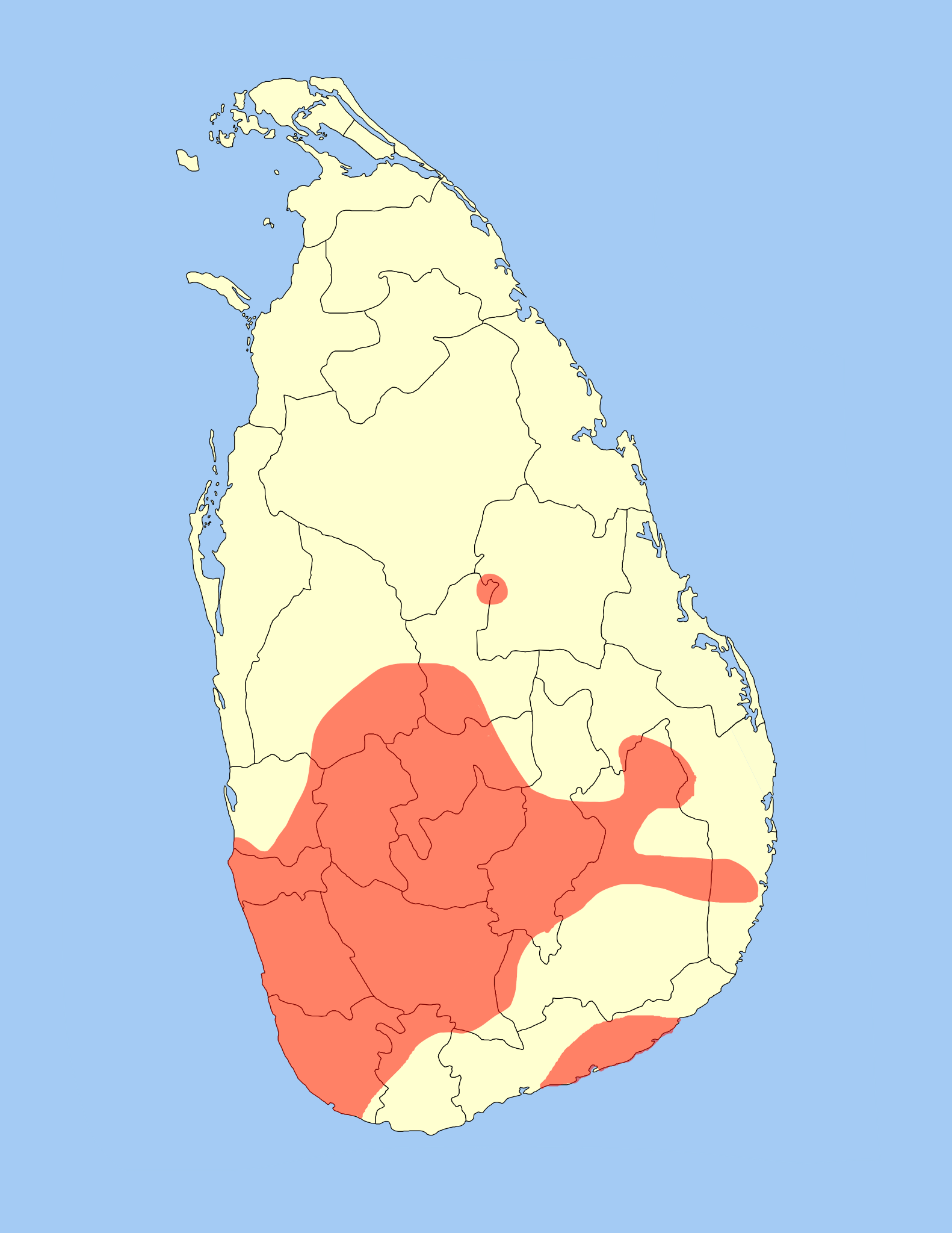

= Sri Lanka hanging parrot =

Species of bird

The Sri Lanka hanging parrot (Loriculus beryllinus) is a small parrot which is a resident endemic breeder in Sri Lanka.

== Description ==
The Sri Lanka hanging parrot is a small hanging parrot that is 13 cm long with a short tail. The adult has a red crown and rump. The nape and back have on orange tint. The chin and throat are pale blue. The beak is red and the irises are white.

Immature birds lack the orange hue to the back, have a duller rump, and have only a hint of orange on the crown. They have a faint blue throat. They have orange beaks and brown irises.

== Behaviour ==
Sri Lanka hanging parrot is less gregarious than some of its relatives, and is usually alone or in small groups outside the breeding season. Its flight is swift and direct, and the call is a sharp whistled twiwittwit..twitwitwit. It undergoes local movements, driven mainly by the availability of the fruit, seeds, buds and blossoms that make up its diet.

Sri Lanka hanging parrot is a bird of open forest. It is strictly arboreal, never descending to the ground. It nests in holes in trees, laying 2–3 eggs. Females are involved in building the nest while males mostly remain close, observing the females. Breeding season includes the first part of the year and sometimes July–September.

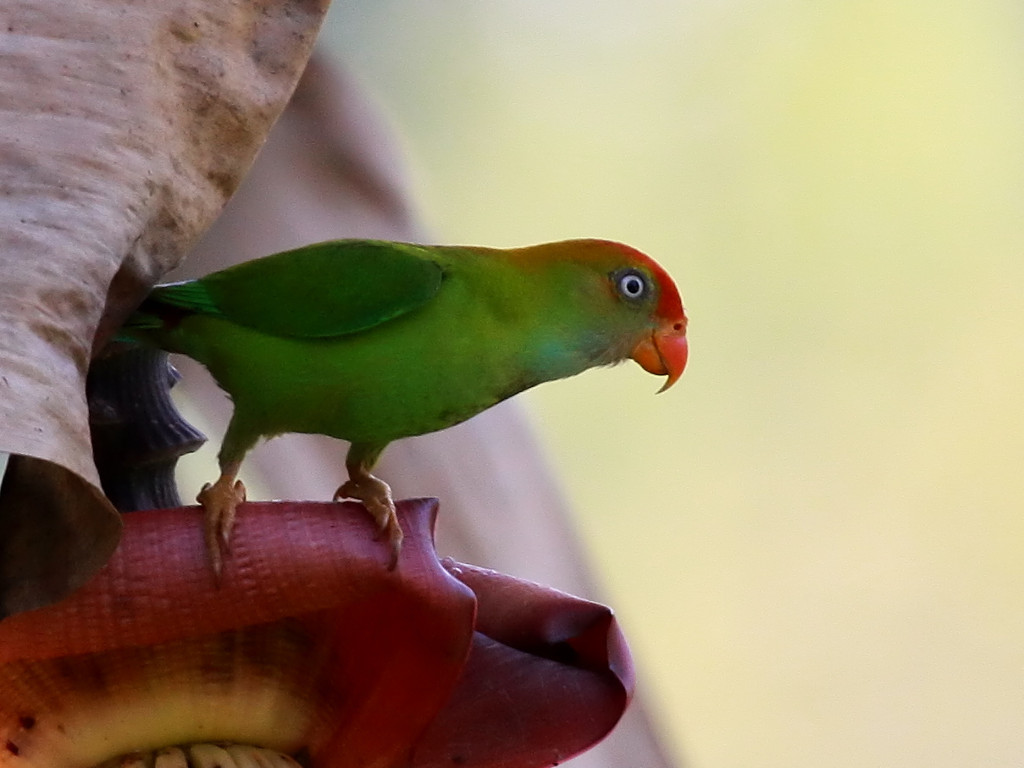
Sri Lanka hanging parrot at Sinharaja Forest Reserve, Sri Lanka

== In culture ==
In Sri Lanka, this bird is known as Gira Maliththa - ගිරාමලිත්තා or Pol Girwa - පොල් ගිරවා in Sinhala language. The hanging parrot appears in a 15 cent Sri Lankan postage stamp. This bird also appears on the 1000 Sri Lankan rupee bank note (2010 series).

== Cited texts ==
- Forshaw, Joseph M. (2006). Parrots of the World; an Identification Guide. Illustrated by Frank Knight. Princeton University Press. ISBN 0-691-09251-6.
- Birds of India by Grimmett, Inskipp and Inskipp, ISBN 0-691-04910-6
