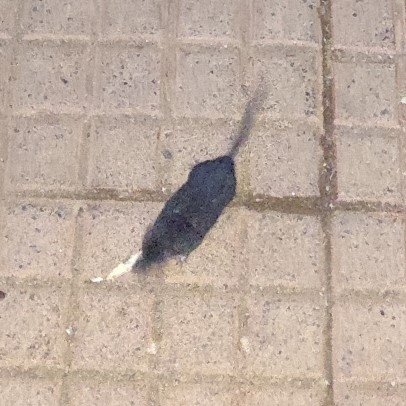

Conservation status
- Least Concern (IUCN 3.1)

Scientific classification
- Kingdom: Animalia
- Phylum: Chordata
- Class: Mammalia
- Order: Eulipotyphla
- Family: Soricidae
- Genus: Suncus
- Species: S. montanus

Binomial name
- Suncus montanus (Kelaart, 1850)
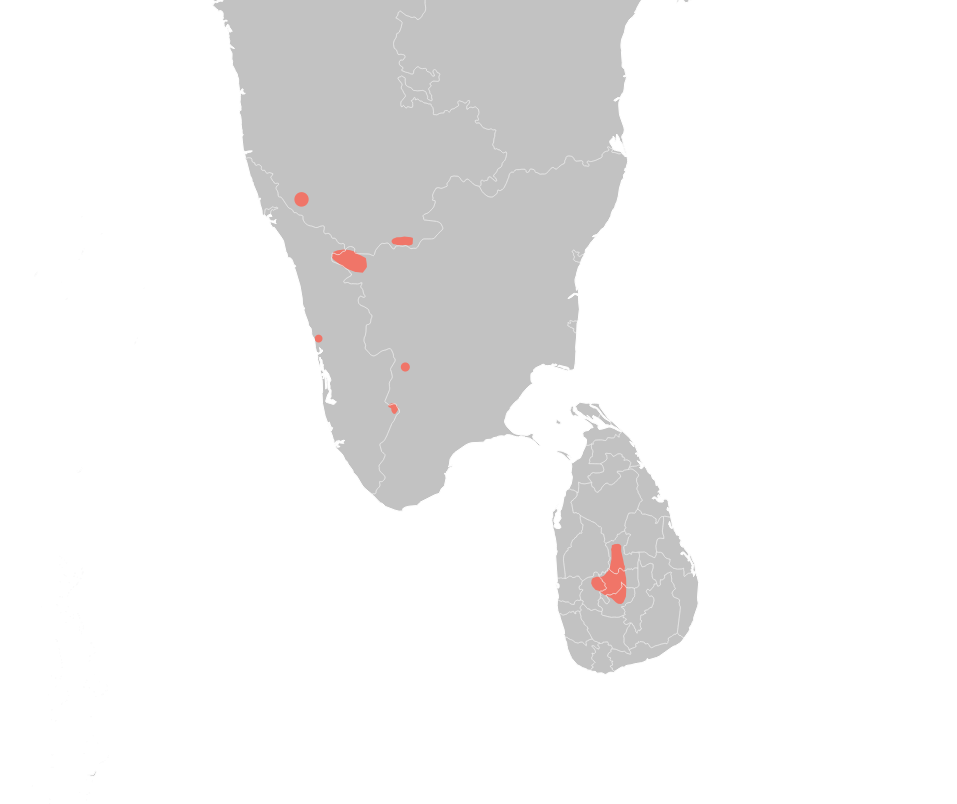
- Asian highland shrew distribution in southern India and Sri Lanka

= Asian highland shrew =

Species of mammal

The Asian highland shrew (Suncus montanus) is a species of mammal in the family Soricidae. It is found in India and Sri Lanka. Its habitat is subtropical or tropical dry forests.

== Description ==
The head and body reach 9–11 cm (3.5–4.3 in) in length. The tail is around 7 cm (2.8 in) long. It is dark bluish-brown to black above and paler below. The pelage may be bluish-gray at the base. Some adults are reddish brown. The fur is soft and velvety and hairless areas are pinkish.
