= List of botanical gardens in Sri Lanka =

Botanical gardens in Sri Lanka have collections consisting entirely of Sri Lankan native and endemic species; most have a collection that includes plants from around the world. There are botanical gardens and arboreta in all states and territories of Sri Lanka; most are administered by local governments and some are privately owned.

- Hakgala Botanical Garden
- Henarathgoda Botanical Garden, 7°06′00″N 79°59′10″E
- Mirijjawila Botanical Garden
- Royal Botanic Gardens, Peradeniya, Kandy
- Seethawaka Botanical Garden
