= Stemonoporus elegans =

Conservation status
- Endangered (IUCN 3.1)

Scientific classification
- Kingdom: Plantae
- Clade: Tracheophytes
- Clade: Angiosperms
- Clade: Eudicots
- Clade: Rosids
- Order: Malvales
- Family: Dipterocarpaceae
- Genus: Stemonoporus
- Species: S. elegans

Binomial name
- Stemonoporus elegans (Thwaites) Alston

Synonyms
- Monoporandra elegans Thwaites; Vateria elegans (Thwaites) Thwaites

Species of tree

Stemonoporus elegans is a species of flowering plant in the family Dipterocarpaceae. It is endemic to southwestern Sri Lanka. It is a small to medium-sized tree native to the southern slope of Adam's Peak, where it forms small subpopulations in submontane rain forest.

The species was first described as Monoporandra elegans by George Henry Kendrick Thwaites in 1954. In 1931 Arthur Hugh Garfit Alston placed the species in genus Stemonoporus as S. elegans.
