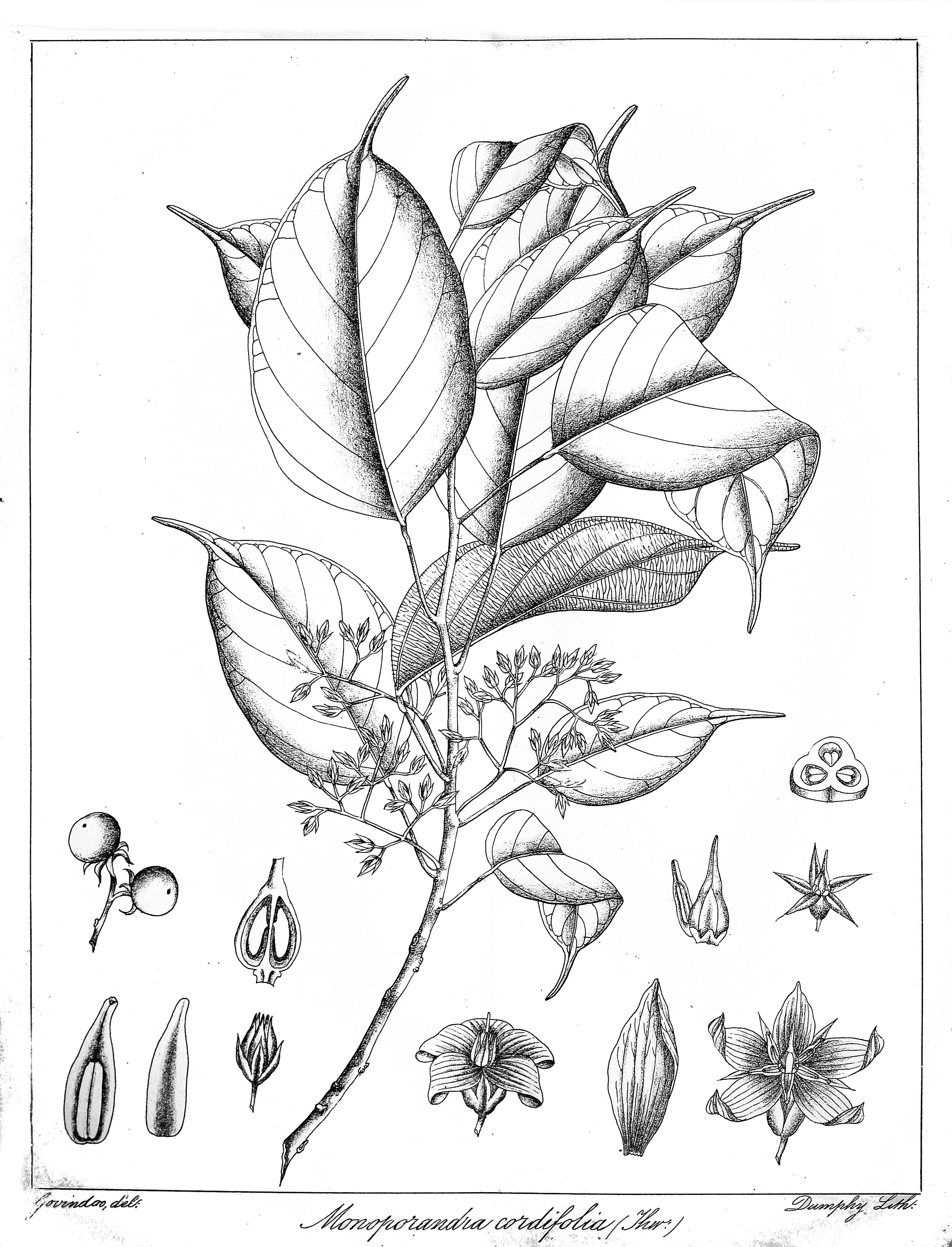

Conservation status
- Endangered (IUCN 3.1)

Scientific classification
- Kingdom: Plantae
- Clade: Tracheophytes
- Clade: Angiosperms
- Clade: Eudicots
- Clade: Rosids
- Order: Malvales
- Family: Dipterocarpaceae
- Genus: Stemonoporus
- Species: S. cordifolius

Binomial name
- Stemonoporus cordifolius (Thwaites) Alston

Synonyms
- Monoporandra cordifolia Thwaites; Vateria cordifolia (Thwaites) Thwaites

= Stemonoporus cordifolius =

Species of tree

Stemonoporus cordifolius (Sinhalese: Iri Dorala) is a species of flowering plant in the family Dipterocarpaceae. It is a tree endemic to southwestern Sri Lanka, where it is limited to the southern slopes of Adam's Peak. It is a gregarious understory tree in evergreen montane rain forest.

The species was first described as Monoporandra cordifolia by George Henry Kendrick Thwaites in 1854. In 1931 Arthur Hugh Garfit Alston placed the species in genus Stemonoporus as S. cordifolius.
