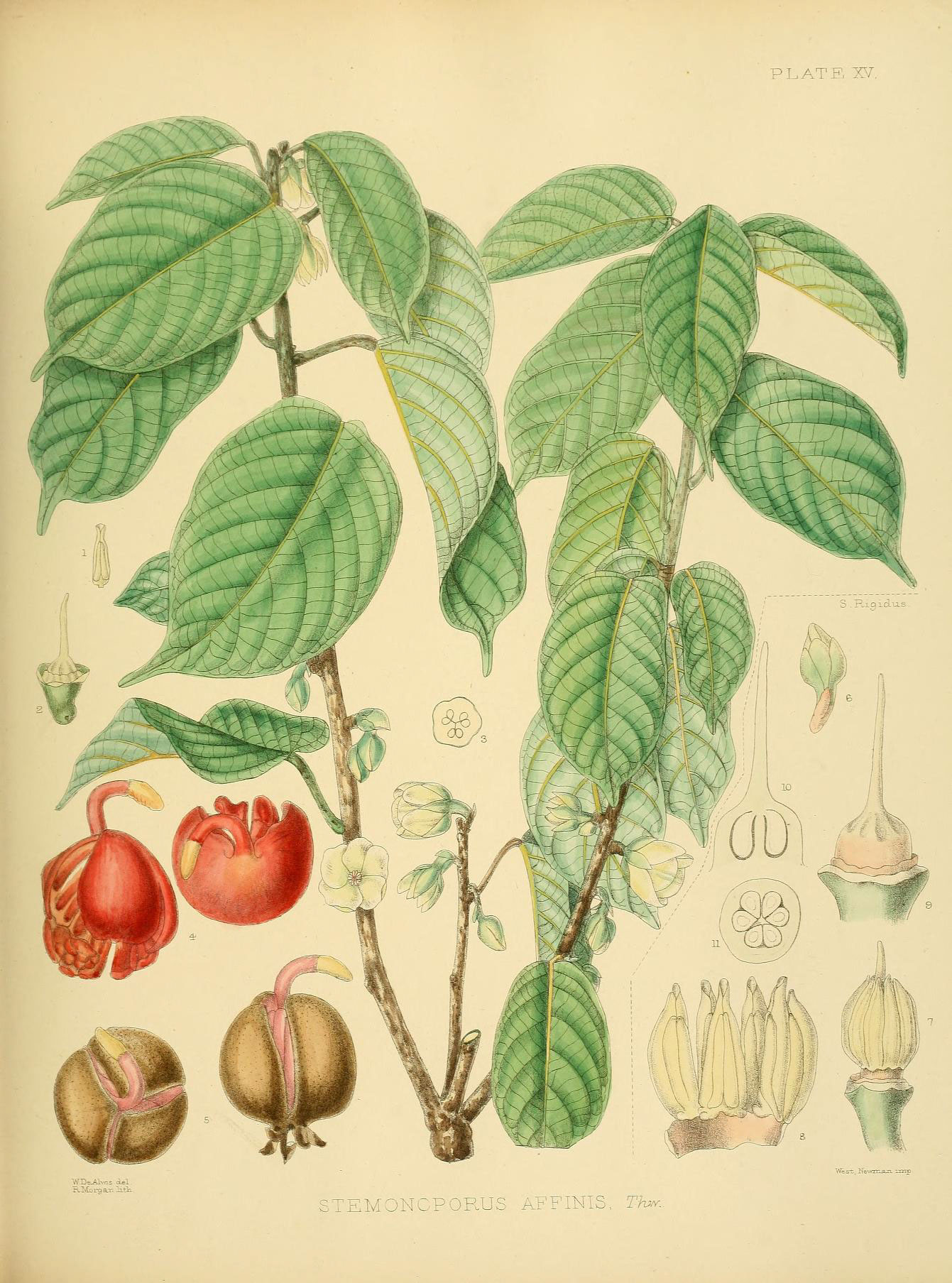
- Stemonoporus affinis

Scientific classification
- Kingdom: Plantae
- Clade: Tracheophytes
- Clade: Angiosperms
- Clade: Eudicots
- Clade: Rosids
- Order: Malvales
- Family: Dipterocarpaceae
- Subfamily: Dipterocarpoideae
- Genus: Stemonoporus; Thwaites

Synonyms
- Hemiphractum Turcz.; Kunckelia F.Heim; Monoporandra Thwaites; Sunapteopsis F.Heim; Vesquella F.Heim

= Stemonoporus =

Genus of trees

Stemonoporus is a genus of plants in the family Dipterocarpaceae. The genus is endemic to Sri Lanka. It contains 26 species, all but one confined to the perhumid forests of the island.

== Species ==
26 species are accepted:

- Stemonoporus acuminatus (Thwaites) Bedd.
- Stemonoporus affinis Thwaites
- Stemonoporus angustisepalus Kosterm.
- Stemonoporus bullatus Kosterm.
- Stemonoporus canaliculatus Thwaites
- Stemonoporus ceylanicus (Wight) Alston
- Stemonoporus cordifolius (Thwaites) Alston
- Stemonoporus elegans (Thwaites) Alston
- Stemonoporus gardneri Thwaites
- Stemonoporus gilimalensis Kosterm.
- Stemonoporus gracilis Kosterm.
- Stemonoporus kanneliyensis Kosterm.
- Stemonoporus laevifolius Kosterm.
- Stemonoporus lanceolatus Thwaites
- Stemonoporus lancifolius (Thwaites) P.S.Ashton
- Stemonoporus latisepalus Kosterm.
- Stemonoporus marginalis Kosterm.
- Stemonoporus moonii Thwaites
- Stemonoporus nitidus Thwaites
- Stemonoporus oblongifolius Thwaites
- Stemonoporus petiolaris Thwaites
- Stemonoporus reticulatus Thwaites
- Stemonoporus revolutus Trimen ex Hook.f.
- Stemonoporus rigidus Thwaites
- Stemonoporus scalarinervis Kosterm.
- Stemonoporus scaphifolius Kosterm.
