= Stemonoporus rigidus =

Conservation status
- Endangered (IUCN 3.1)

Scientific classification
- Kingdom: Plantae
- Clade: Tracheophytes
- Clade: Angiosperms
- Clade: Eudicots
- Clade: Rosids
- Order: Malvales
- Family: Dipterocarpaceae
- Genus: Stemonoporus
- Species: S. rigidus

Binomial name
- Stemonoporus rigidus Thwaites

Synonyms
- Vateria rigida (Thwaites) Thwaites; Vatica rigida (Thwaites) A.DC.

Species of tree

Stemonoporus rigidus is a species of flowering plant in the family Dipterocarpaceae. It is a tree which grows up to 15 metres tall that is endemic central Sri Lanka. It is native to submontane evergreen rain forest between 1000 and 1200 metres elevation in Kandy, Nuwara Eliya (Ambagamuwa region), and Ratnagiri districts. It is threatened by overharvesting for timber and by habitat loss from deforestation for smallholder farms. The IUCN Red List assesses the species as endangered.

The species was first described by George Henry Kendrick Thwaites in 1854.
