= Stemonoporus lanceolatus =

Conservation status
- Critically Endangered (IUCN 3.1)

Scientific classification
- Kingdom: Plantae
- Clade: Tracheophytes
- Clade: Angiosperms
- Clade: Eudicots
- Clade: Rosids
- Order: Malvales
- Family: Dipterocarpaceae
- Genus: Stemonoporus
- Species: S. lanceolatus

Binomial name
- Stemonoporus lanceolatus Thwaites

Synonyms
- Vateria lanceolata (Thwaites) Thwaites

Species of tree

Stemonoporus lanceolatus is a species of flowering plant in the family Dipterocarpaceae. It is a tree endemic to southwestern Sri Lanka. It is known from a single location in Ratnapura District, where it grows in remaining patches of lowland evergreen rain forest. The species is threatened with habitat loss from deforestation for agricultural expansion. The IUCN Red List assesses the species as critically endangered.

The species was first described by George Henry Kendrick Thwaites in 1854.
