= Kendrickia =

Kendrickia may refer to:

- Kendrickia (gastropod), a genus of gastropods in the family Camaenidae
- Kendrickia (plant), a genus of plants in the family Melastomataceae
