= S. gardneri =

S. gardneri may refer to:

- Shorea gardneri, a plant species endemic to Sri Lanka
- Spathiphyllum gardneri, a plant species in the genus Spathiphyllum
- Stemonoporus gardneri, a plant species endemic to Sri Lanka
- Semecarpus gardneri, a plant species endemic to Sri Lanka

== See also ==
- Gardneri
