= Stemonoporus reticulatus =

Conservation status
- Endangered (IUCN 3.1)

Scientific classification
- Kingdom: Plantae
- Clade: Tracheophytes
- Clade: Angiosperms
- Clade: Eudicots
- Clade: Rosids
- Order: Malvales
- Family: Dipterocarpaceae
- Genus: Stemonoporus
- Species: S. reticulatus

Binomial name
- Stemonoporus reticulatus Thwaites

Synonyms
- Kunckelia reticulata F.Heim; Sunaptea reticulata (Thwaites) Ridl.; Vateria reticulata (Thwaites) Thwaites; Vatica reticulata (Thwaites) A.DC.

Species of tree

Stemonoporus reticulatus (Sinhalese: Hal-mandora) is a species of flowering plant in the family Dipterocarpaceae. It is a small tree endemic to southwestern Sri Lanka. It grows on ridge crests in remaining lowland evergreen rain forest. The species is threatened by habitat loss from deforestation, and the remaining populations are increasingly fragmented. The IUCN Red List assesses the species as endangered.

The species was first described by George Henry Kendrick Thwaites in 1958.
