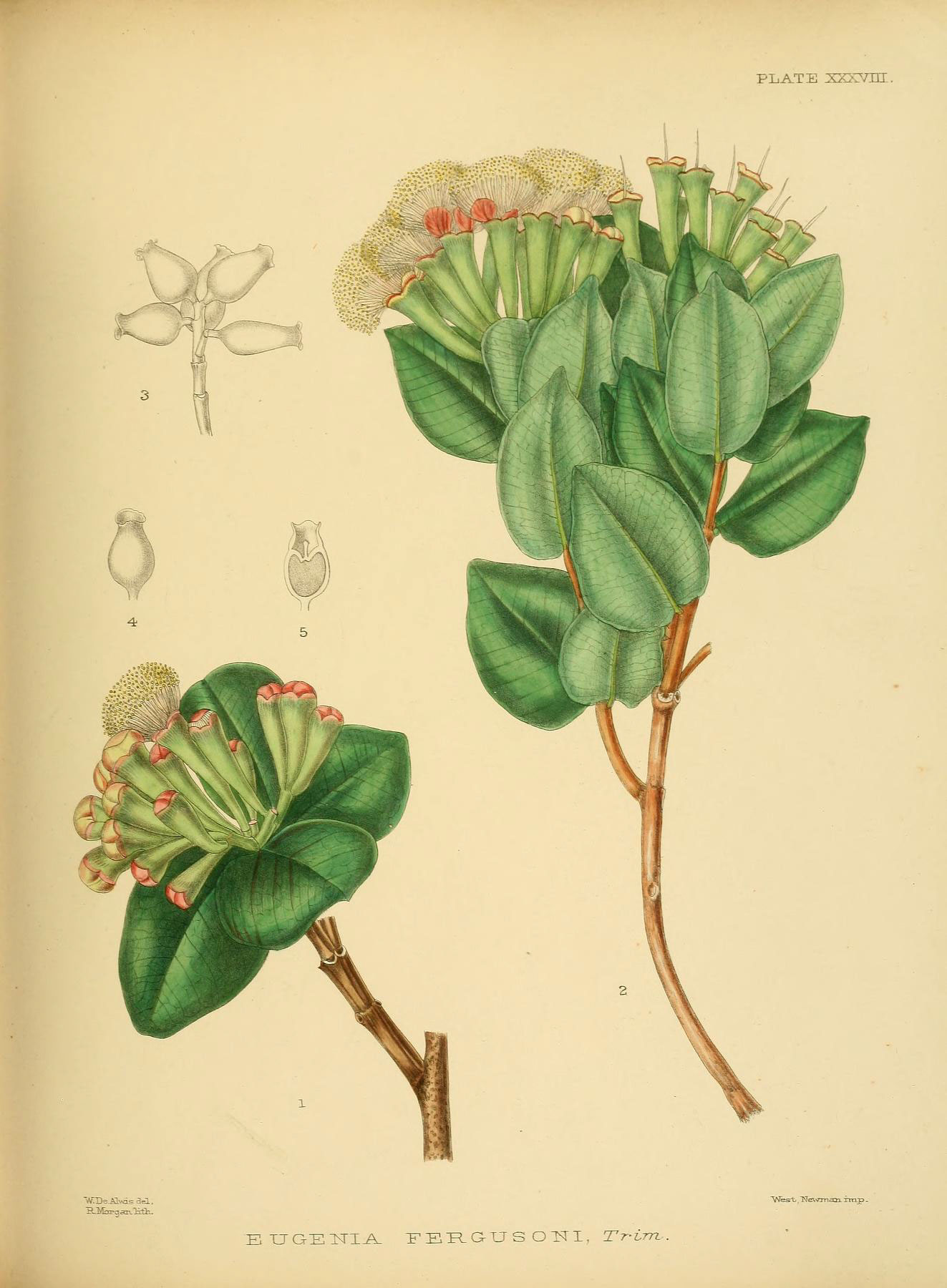

Conservation status
- Endangered (IUCN 2.3)

Scientific classification
- Kingdom: Plantae
- Clade: Tracheophytes
- Clade: Angiosperms
- Clade: Eudicots
- Clade: Rosids
- Order: Myrtales
- Family: Myrtaceae
- Genus: Syzygium
- Species: S. fergusonii

Binomial name
- Syzygium fergusonii (Trimen) Gamble

Synonyms
- Eugenia fergusonii Trimen; Syzygium chandrasekharanii Chandrab. & V.Chandras.

= Syzygium fergusonii =

Species of flowering plant

Syzygium fergusonii is a species of flowering plant in the family Myrtaceae. It is a shrub or tree native to Sri Lanka and southwestern India.
