= Stemonoporus moonii =

Conservation status
- Critically Endangered (IUCN 3.1)

Scientific classification
- Kingdom: Plantae
- Clade: Tracheophytes
- Clade: Angiosperms
- Clade: Eudicots
- Clade: Rosids
- Order: Malvales
- Family: Dipterocarpaceae
- Genus: Stemonoporus
- Species: S. moonii

Binomial name
- Stemonoporus moonii Thwaites

Synonyms
- Vateria moonii (Thwaites) Thwaites; Vatica moonii (Thwaites) A.DC.

Species of tree

Stemonoporus moonii (Sinhalese: Hora-wel) is a species of plant in the family Dipterocarpaceae. It is a shrub or small tree up to 4 metres tall which is endemic to southwestern Sri Lanka. It is known from a single location in Kalutara District, where it grows in the understorey of one of Sri Lanka's last remaining freshwater swamp forests and in marshy, periodically inundated areas near slow-running streams. It is threatened by habitat loss from the conversion of swamp forests to rice fields. The IUCN Red List assesses the species as critically endangered.

The species was first described by George Henry Kendrick Thwaites in 1858.
