= Stemonoporus nitidus =

Conservation status
- Critically Endangered (IUCN 3.1)

Scientific classification
- Kingdom: Plantae
- Clade: Tracheophytes
- Clade: Angiosperms
- Clade: Eudicots
- Clade: Rosids
- Order: Malvales
- Family: Dipterocarpaceae
- Genus: Stemonoporus
- Species: S. nitidus

Binomial name
- Stemonoporus nitidus Thwaites

Synonyms
- Doona nitida (Thwaites) F.Heim; Vateria nitida (Thwaites) Thwaites; Vatica nitida (Thwaites) A.DC.

Species of tree

Stemonoporus nitidus is a species of flowering plant in the family Dipterocarpaceae. It is a small tree endemic to southwestern Sri Lanka. It is known from a single 19th-century collection on a ridge in lowland evergreen rain forest. It is threatened by habitat loss from forest clearance for smallholder farms and plantations. Subsequent surveys have not located any populations, and the species may be extinct.

The species was first described by George Henry Kendrick Thwaites in 1858.
