= Stemonoporus revolutus =

Conservation status
- Endangered (IUCN 3.1)

Scientific classification
- Kingdom: Plantae
- Clade: Tracheophytes
- Clade: Angiosperms
- Clade: Eudicots
- Clade: Rosids
- Order: Malvales
- Family: Dipterocarpaceae
- Genus: Stemonoporus
- Species: S. revolutus

Binomial name
- Stemonoporus revolutus Trimen ex Hook.f.

Species of tree

Stemonoporus revolutus is a species of flowering plant in the family Dipterocarpaceae. It is a small tree endemic to southwestern Sri Lanka. It is known from six locations in hill evergreen rain forest. It is threatened by overharvesting for timber, and by habitat loss from deforestation for expansion of smallholder farms and plantations.
