= Stemonoporus lancifolius =

Conservation status
- Endangered (IUCN 3.1)

Scientific classification
- Kingdom: Plantae
- Clade: Tracheophytes
- Clade: Angiosperms
- Clade: Eudicots
- Clade: Rosids
- Order: Malvales
- Family: Dipterocarpaceae
- Genus: Stemonoporus
- Species: S. lancifolius

Binomial name
- Stemonoporus lancifolius (Thwaites) P.S.Ashton

Synonyms
- Monoporandra lancifolia Thwaites (1858) (basionym); Stemonoporus nitidus subsp. lancifolius (Thwaites) Dyer; Stemonoporus nervosus (Thwaites ex Trimen) Trimen; Vateria lancifolia (Thwaites) Thwaites; Vateria nervosa Thwaites ex Trimen

Species of tree

Stemonoporus lancifolius is a species of flowering plant in the family Dipterocarpaceae. It is a small tree endemic to southwestern Sri Lanka. It is known from a few hillside and riverbank locations in lowland evergreen rain forest. The species is threatened with habitat loss from deforestation by expanding smallholder farms. The IUCN Red List assesses the species as endangered.

The species was first described as Monoporandra lancifolia by George Henry Kendrick Thwaites in 1858. In 1973 Peter Shaw Ashton placed the species in genus Stemonoporus as S. lancifolius.
