= Eugenia phillyraeoides =

Scientific classification
- Kingdom: Plantae
- Clade: Tracheophytes
- Clade: Angiosperms
- Clade: Eudicots
- Clade: Rosids
- Order: Myrtales
- Family: Myrtaceae
- Genus: Eugenia
- Species: E. phillyraeoides

Binomial name
- Eugenia phillyraeoides Trimen

Synonyms
- Syzygium phillyraeoides (Trimen) Santapau

Species of flowering plant

Eugenia phillyraeoides is a species of plant in the family Myrtaceae. It is endemic to Sri Lanka.
