= Stemonoporus canaliculatus =

Conservation status
- Endangered (IUCN 3.1)

Scientific classification
- Kingdom: Plantae
- Clade: Tracheophytes
- Clade: Angiosperms
- Clade: Eudicots
- Clade: Rosids
- Order: Malvales
- Family: Dipterocarpaceae
- Genus: Stemonoporus
- Species: S. canaliculatus

Binomial name
- Stemonoporus canaliculatus Thwaites

Synonyms
- Vateria canaliculata (Thwaites) Thwaites; Vatica canaliculata (Thwaites) A.DC.

Species of tree

Stemonoporus canaliculatus is a species of plant in the family Dipterocarpaceae. It is endemic to southwestern Sri Lanka, where it is an understory tree in remaining lowland wet evergreen rain forest.

The species was first described by George Henry Kendrick Thwaites in 1858.
