= Trimen =

Trimen is a surname. Notable people with the surname include:

- Henry Trimen (1843–1896), British botanist
- Roland Trimen (1840–1916), British-South African naturalist
