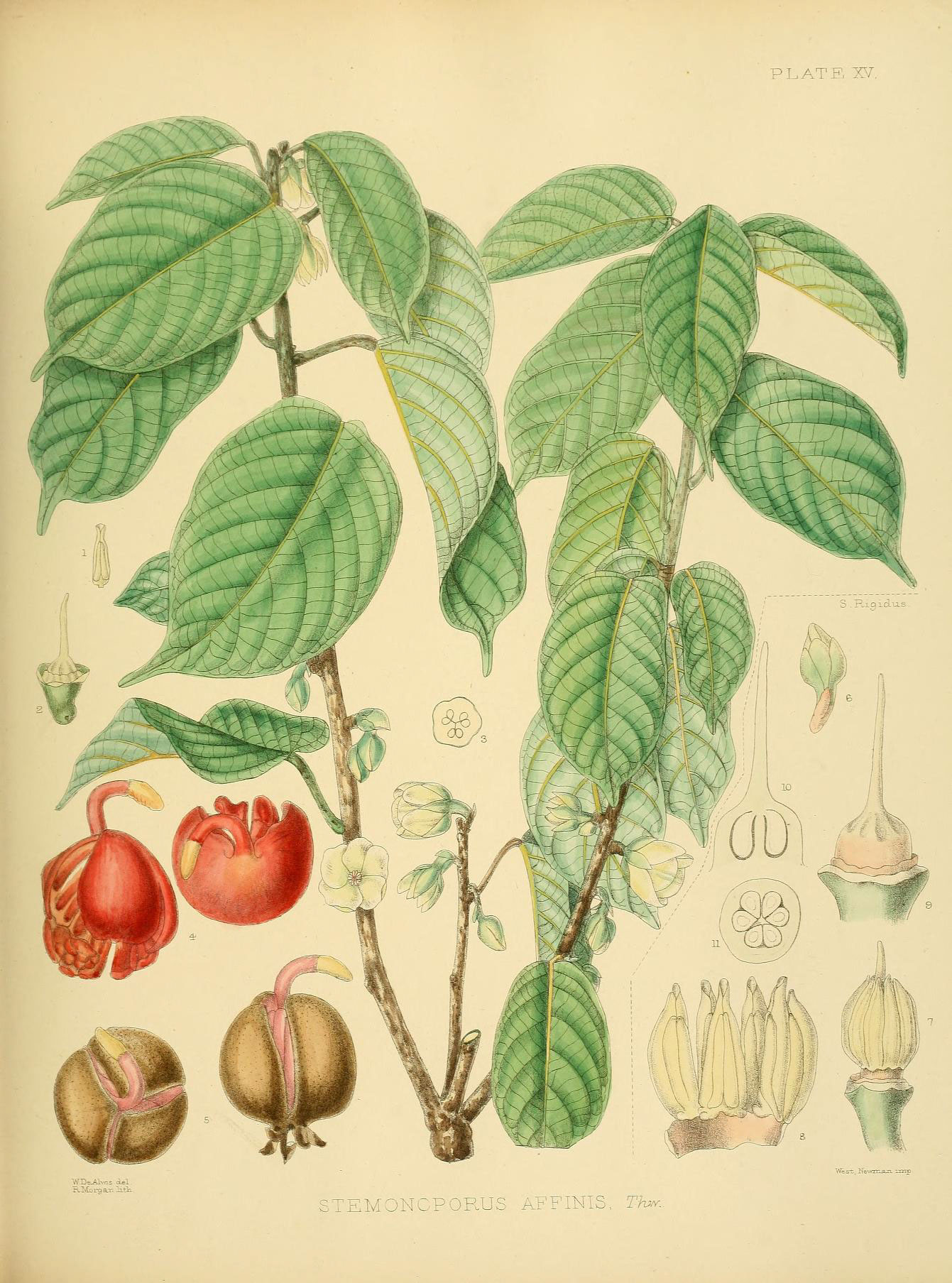

Conservation status
- Critically Endangered (IUCN 3.1)

Scientific classification
- Kingdom: Plantae
- Clade: Tracheophytes
- Clade: Angiosperms
- Clade: Eudicots
- Clade: Rosids
- Order: Malvales
- Family: Dipterocarpaceae
- Genus: Stemonoporus
- Species: S. affinis

Binomial name
- Stemonoporus affinis Thwaites

Synonyms
- Vateria affinis (Thwaites) Thwaites; Vatica thwaitesii A.DC.

= Stemonoporus affinis =

Species of tree

Stemonoporus affinis is a species of plant in the family Dipterocarpaceae. It is a tree endemic to Sri Lanka, where it is known only from the Knuckles Range. It is a small, gregarious lower canopy tree growing in remaining patches of submontane wet evergreen forest.

The species was first described by George Henry Kendrick Thwaites in 1854.
