= Stemonoporus ceylanicus =

Conservation status
- Endangered (IUCN 3.1)

Scientific classification
- Kingdom: Plantae
- Clade: Tracheophytes
- Clade: Angiosperms
- Clade: Eudicots
- Clade: Rosids
- Order: Malvales
- Family: Dipterocarpaceae
- Genus: Stemonoporus
- Species: S. ceylanicus

Binomial name
- Stemonoporus ceylanicus (Wight) Alston

Synonyms
- Stemonoporus macrophyllus Thwaites; Stemonoporus wightii Thwaites; Stemonoporus zeylanicus (Wight) Alston, orth. var.; Vateria ceylanica Wight (1838) (basionym); Vateria wightii (Thwaites) Thwaites; Vateria zeylanica Walp.; Vatica wightii (Thwaites) A.DC.

Species of flowering plant

Stemonoporus ceylanicus (Sinhalese: Hal-mandora) is a species of flowering plant in the family Dipterocarpaceae. It is a tree native to Sri Lanka. It is a large tree which grows near streams in lowland evergreen rain forest. The IUCN assesses the species as Endangered.
