= Stemonoporus petiolaris =

Conservation status
- Endangered (IUCN 3.1)

Scientific classification
- Kingdom: Plantae
- Clade: Tracheophytes
- Clade: Angiosperms
- Clade: Eudicots
- Clade: Rosids
- Order: Malvales
- Family: Dipterocarpaceae
- Genus: Stemonoporus
- Species: S. petiolaris

Binomial name
- Stemonoporus petiolaris Thwaites

Synonyms
- Vateria petiolaris (Thwaites) Thwaites; Vatica petiolaris (Thwaites) A.DC.

Species of tree

Stemonoporus petiolaris is a species of flowering plant in the family Dipterocarpaceae. It is a small tree endemic to Sri Lanka. It is known from three locations including Kitulgala and Gilimale, where it grows in lowland evergreen rain forest on well-drained deep soil. It is threatened by habitat loss from deforestation for smallholder farms. The IUCN Red List assesses the species as endangered.

The species was first described by George Henry Kendrick Thwaites in 1858.
