= Stemonoporus oblongifolius =

Conservation status
- Endangered (IUCN 3.1)

Scientific classification
- Kingdom: Plantae
- Clade: Tracheophytes
- Clade: Angiosperms
- Clade: Eudicots
- Clade: Rosids
- Order: Malvales
- Family: Dipterocarpaceae
- Genus: Stemonoporus
- Species: S. oblongifolius

Binomial name
- Stemonoporus oblongifolius Thwaites

Synonyms
- Vateria oblongifolia (Thwaites) Thwaites; Vatica oblonga A.DC.; Vesquella oblongifolia (Thwaites) F.Heim

Species of tree

Stemonoporus oblongifolius is a species of flowering plant in the family Dipterocarpaceae. It is a small tree endemic to southwestern Sri Lanka. It is native to Adam's Peak, where it is sparsely distributed in hill evergreen rain forest.

The species was first described by George Henry Kendrick Thwaites in 1854.
