= Stemonoporus latisepalus =

Conservation status
- Critically Endangered (IUCN 3.1)

Scientific classification
- Kingdom: Plantae
- Clade: Tracheophytes
- Clade: Angiosperms
- Clade: Eudicots
- Clade: Rosids
- Order: Malvales
- Family: Dipterocarpaceae
- Genus: Stemonoporus
- Species: S. latisepalus

Binomial name
- Stemonoporus latisepalus Kosterm.

Species of tree

Stemonoporus latisepalus is a species of flowering plant in the family Dipterocarpaceae. It is a tree endemic to southwestern Sri Lanka. It is known from two locations in Sabaragamuwa Province, where it grows in lowland evergreen rain forest. It is threatened by overharvesting for timber and habitat loss from deforestation for smallholder farms, tea plantations, and roads. The IUCN Red List assesses the species as critically endangered.

The species was first described by André Joseph Guillaume Henri Kostermans in 1980.
