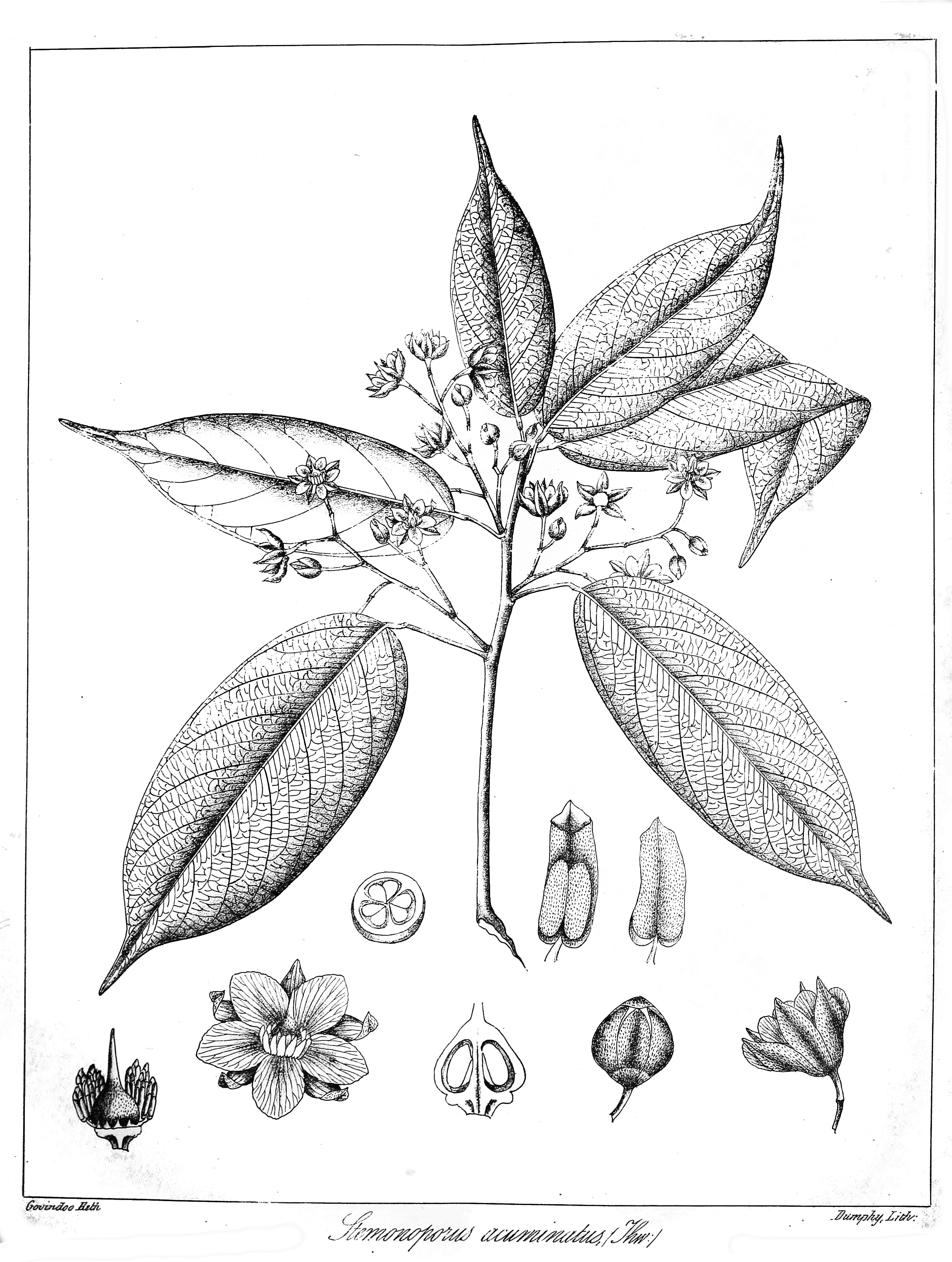

Conservation status
- Vulnerable (IUCN 3.1)

Scientific classification
- Kingdom: Plantae
- Clade: Tracheophytes
- Clade: Angiosperms
- Clade: Eudicots
- Clade: Rosids
- Order: Malvales
- Family: Dipterocarpaceae
- Genus: Stemonoporus
- Species: S. acuminatus

Binomial name
- Stemonoporus acuminatus (A.DC.) Bedd.

Synonyms
- Hemiphractum oxyandrum Turcz.; Sunapteopsis jucunda (Thwaites ex Dyer) F.Heim; Vateria acuminata Thwaites, nom. illeg. homonym. post.; Vateria jucunda Thwaites ex Dyer; Vatica acuminata A.DC. (1868); Vesquella acuminata (A.DC.) F.Heim

= Stemonoporus acuminatus =

Species of tree

Stemonoporus acuminatus is a species of flowering plant in the family Dipterocarpaceae. It is a tree endemic to southwestern Sri Lanka. It is native to lowland and montane evergreen rain forests above 600 metres elevation.

The species was first described as Vatica acuminata by Alphonse Pyramus de Candolle in 1868. In 1871 Richard Henry Beddome placed the species in genus Stemonoporus as S. acuminatus.

== Trunk ==
Often distorted.

== Flowers ==
Inflorescence - axillary.
