= National Herbarium of Sri Lanka =

- Interactive map of National Herbarium of Sri Lanka
- Type: Herbarium
- Location: Peradeniya, Sri Lanka
- Coordinates: 7°16′16″N 80°35′44″E
- Created: around 1821
- Operator: Department of National Botanic Gardens, Sri Lanka
- Status: Open all year
- Website: Official Website

The National Herbarium at Peradeniya, near Kandy in the Central province of Sri Lanka, was started in about 1821 by Alexander Moon, who was the director of the Botanical Gardens there.
