= Thwaites's skink =

Scientific classification
- Kingdom: Animalia
- Phylum: Chordata
- Class: Reptilia
- Order: Squamata
- Family: Scincidae
- Genus: Chalcidoseps; Boulenger, 1887
- Species: C. thwaitesi

Binomial name
- Chalcidoseps thwaitesi (Günther, 1872)

Synonyms
- Nessia thwaitesi Günther, 1872; Chalcidoseps thwaitesi — Boulenger, 1887

Species of lizard

Thwaites's skink (Chalcidoseps thwaitesi), also known commonly as the fourtoe snakeskink, is a species of skink, a lizard in the family Scincidae. The species is endemic to the island of Sri Lanka.

== Etymology ==
The specific name, thwaitesi, is in honor of English botanist George Henry Kendrick Thwaites.

== Taxonomy ==
C. thwaitesi is the only species in the monotypic genus Chalcidoseps.

== Habitat and geographic range ==
A highly fossorial skink, C. theaitesi is known from the Knuckles Mountain Range, between 700–1,000 m (2,300–3,300 ft).

== Description ==
C. thwaitesi has small eyes with scaly lower eyelids. The midbody scales are smooth, in 24-26 rows. The body and tail are elongate, and the tail is as wide as the body. The limbs are short and rudimentary, each bearing four toes, the inner two toes being short. The dorsum is dark brown, with a blackish-brown central region.

== Ecology ==
In many places, C. thwaitesi lives in sympatry with skinks of the genera Nessia and Lankascincus.

== Diet ==
The diet of C. thwaitesi comprises insects.

== Reproduction ==
C. thwaitesi is oviparous. In April an adult female may lay a clutch of two eggs, each egg measuring 6–11 mm x 18 mm (.33 x .71 inch).
