= Stemonoporus scaphifolius =

Conservation status
- Critically Endangered (IUCN 3.1)

Scientific classification
- Kingdom: Plantae
- Clade: Tracheophytes
- Clade: Angiosperms
- Clade: Eudicots
- Clade: Rosids
- Order: Malvales
- Family: Dipterocarpaceae
- Genus: Stemonoporus
- Species: S. scaphifolius

Binomial name
- Stemonoporus scaphifolius Kosterm.

Species of tree

Stemonoporus scaphifolius is a species of plant in the family Dipterocarpaceae. It is a small tree endemic to Sri Lanka. It is known from a single collection made in 1980 from lowland evergreen dipterocarp rain forest in Ratnapura District. It is either extremely rare or extinct.

The species was first described by André Joseph Guillaume Henri Kostermans in 1982.
