= Stemonoporus bullatus =

Conservation status
- Critically Endangered (IUCN 3.1)

Scientific classification
- Kingdom: Plantae
- Clade: Tracheophytes
- Clade: Angiosperms
- Clade: Eudicots
- Clade: Rosids
- Order: Malvales
- Family: Dipterocarpaceae
- Genus: Stemonoporus
- Species: S. bullatus

Binomial name
- Stemonoporus bullatus Kosterm.

Species of tree

Stemonoporus bullatus is a species of plant in the family Dipterocarpaceae. It is a tree endemic to southwestern Sri Lanka. It is known from only three locations, where it grows in lowland evergreen rain forest and in disturbed areas.

The species was first described by André Joseph Guillaume Henri Kostermans in 1980.
