= Stemonoporus gilimalensis =

Conservation status
- Critically Endangered (IUCN 3.1)

Scientific classification
- Kingdom: Plantae
- Clade: Tracheophytes
- Clade: Angiosperms
- Clade: Eudicots
- Clade: Rosids
- Order: Malvales
- Family: Dipterocarpaceae
- Genus: Stemonoporus
- Species: S. gilimalensis

Binomial name
- Stemonoporus gilimalensis Kosterm.

Species of tree

Stemonoporus gilimalensis is a species of flowering plant in the family Dipterocarpaceae. It is a small tree endemic to southwestern Sri Lanka. It is native to Gilimale Forest in Ratnapura District, where it grows in evergreen lowland rain forest, especially along streams.

The species was first described by André Joseph Guillaume Henri Kostermans in 1982.
