= Stemonoporus kanneliyensis =

Conservation status
- Endangered (IUCN 3.1)

Scientific classification
- Kingdom: Plantae
- Clade: Tracheophytes
- Clade: Angiosperms
- Clade: Eudicots
- Clade: Rosids
- Order: Malvales
- Family: Dipterocarpaceae
- Genus: Stemonoporus
- Species: S. kanneliyensis

Binomial name
- Stemonoporus kanneliyensis Kosterm.

Species of tree

Stemonoporus kanneliyensis is a species of flowering plant in the family Dipterocarpaceae. It is a small tree endemic to southwestern Sri Lanka. It is known from a single location in Haycock Biosphere Reserve, where it grows in lowland evergreen rain forest. The IUCN Red List assesses the species as Endangered.

The species was first described by André Joseph Guillaume Henri Kostermans in 1980.
