= Stemonoporus scalarinervis =

Conservation status
- Endangered (IUCN 3.1)

Scientific classification
- Kingdom: Plantae
- Clade: Tracheophytes
- Clade: Angiosperms
- Clade: Eudicots
- Clade: Rosids
- Order: Malvales
- Family: Dipterocarpaceae
- Genus: Stemonoporus
- Species: S. scalarinervis

Binomial name
- Stemonoporus scalarinervis Kosterm.

Species of flowering plant

Stemonoporus scalarinervis (Sinhalese: ugadu-hal) is a species of flowering plant in the family Dipterocarpaceae. It is a tree endemic to southwestern Sri Lanka, where it grows in lowland evergreen rain forest. It is threatened by timber logging and habitat loss from expanding farms, and the IUCN assesses the species as endangered.

The species was first described by André Joseph Guillaume Henri Kostermans in 1982.
