= Stemonoporus angustisepalus =

Conservation status
- Endangered (IUCN 3.1)

Scientific classification
- Kingdom: Plantae
- Clade: Tracheophytes
- Clade: Angiosperms
- Clade: Eudicots
- Clade: Rosids
- Order: Malvales
- Family: Dipterocarpaceae
- Genus: Stemonoporus
- Species: S. angustisepalus

Binomial name
- Stemonoporus angustisepalus Kosterm.

Species of tree

Stemonoporus angustisepalus is a species of flowering plant in the family Dipterocarpaceae. It is a tree endemic to south-central Sri Lanka which grows up to 15 metres tall. It is native to lowland and montane wet evergreen rain forest and disturbed areas around Ratnapura and Balangoda.

The species was first described by André Joseph Guillaume Henri Kostermans in 1980.
