= Seethawaka Botanical Garden =

Botanical garden in Sri Lanka

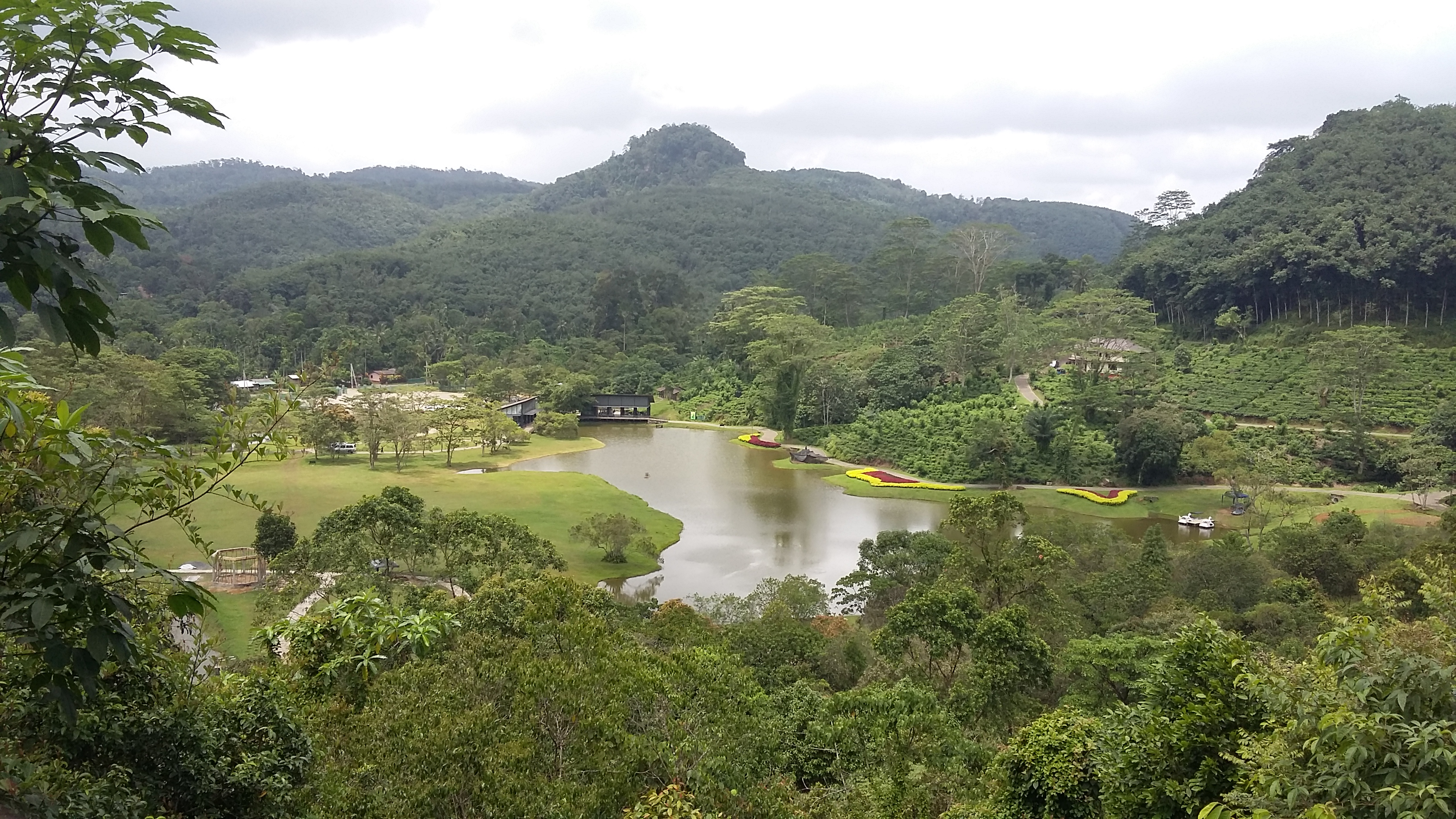
- Interactive map of Seethawaka Botanical Garden
- Type: Botanical garden
- Location: Ilukovita, Avissawella
- Coordinates: 6°57′11″N 80°13′06″E
- Area: 42 hectares (100 acres)
- Created: 2014
- Operator: Commission of Land, Sri Lanka
- Status: Open all year
- Website: Department of National Botanic Gardens, Sri Lanka

Seethawaka Botanical Garden, or Seethawaka Wet Zone Botanic Garden is a botanical garden located in Sri Lanka which mainly serves as a research area and a conservation area for threatened and vulnerable endemic plant species in the Sinharaja Rain Forest region. Improving export floriculture, ex situ conservation of wet lowland plants, and bamboo cultivation are also promoted in this garden. The garden was opened to the public in late October 2014 and it is the most recently constructed botanical garden in Sri Lanka.

== History ==
The garden was established in 20th century as a plantation for Rubber and Tea, which was owned by a garden known as "Pannaagula". But most of the land area was abandoned on that time, which was taken over by the Land Reform Commission. The construction of the Botanical garden commenced in 2008 and it was formally opened to the public in October 2014. The total land area of the garden is 42 ha (105 acres).

== Location and climate ==
Seethawaka Botanical Garden is situated on the Puwakpitiya-Thummodara road, at Illukowita, adjacent to the Indikada Mukalana Forest Reserve at Avissawella. The garden has a tropical climate.

A beautiful stream flows through the garden, which sustains the existence of various wet zone plants. The tree cover is made up of large Terminalia arjuna trees.

== See also ==
- Peradeniya Botanical Garden
- Hakgala Botanical Garden
- Henarathgoda Botanical Garden
- Mirijjawila Botanical Garden
