= Stemonoporus marginalis =

Conservation status
- Critically Endangered (IUCN 3.1)

Scientific classification
- Kingdom: Plantae
- Clade: Tracheophytes
- Clade: Angiosperms
- Clade: Eudicots
- Clade: Rosids
- Order: Malvales
- Family: Dipterocarpaceae
- Genus: Stemonoporus
- Species: S. marginalis

Binomial name
- Stemonoporus marginalis Kosterm.

Species of tree

Stemonoporus marginalis is a species of flowering plant in the family Dipterocarpaceae. It is a tree endemic to southwestern Sri Lanka. It is known from a single location east of the Neluwa-Pelawatta New Road in Galle District, where it grows in lowland evergreen rain forest. The species is threatened by overharvesting for timber, and by habitat loss from deforestation for smallholder farms and plantations. The IUCN Red List assesses the species as endangered.

The species was first described by André Joseph Guillaume Henri Kostermans in 1982.
