= Stemonoporus gracilis =

Conservation status
- Critically Endangered (IUCN 3.1)

Scientific classification
- Kingdom: Plantae
- Clade: Tracheophytes
- Clade: Angiosperms
- Clade: Eudicots
- Clade: Rosids
- Order: Malvales
- Family: Dipterocarpaceae
- Genus: Stemonoporus
- Species: S. gracilis

Binomial name
- Stemonoporus gracilis Kosterm.

Species of tree

Stemonoporus gracilis is a species of flowering plant in the family Dipterocarpaceae. It is a tree endemic to Sri Lanka. It is known from a single population growing in evergreen lowland rain forest along a tributary stream of the Kelani River near Kitulgala region. The species is threatened by timber overharvesting and habitat loss from deforestation for agricultural expansion. The IUCN Red List assesses the species as critically endangered.

The species was first described by André Joseph Guillaume Henri Kostermans in 1980.
