= Stemonoporus laevifolius =

Conservation status
- Critically Endangered (IUCN 3.1)

Scientific classification
- Kingdom: Plantae
- Clade: Tracheophytes
- Clade: Angiosperms
- Clade: Eudicots
- Clade: Rosids
- Order: Malvales
- Family: Dipterocarpaceae
- Genus: Stemonoporus
- Species: S. laevifolius

Binomial name
- Stemonoporus laevifolius Kosterm.

Species of tree

Stemonoporus laevifolius is a species of plant in the family Dipterocarpaceae. It is a tree endemic to southwestern Sri Lanka. It is known from two locations in Sinharaja Forest Reserve, where it grows in lowland evergreen rain forest. The species is threatened by timber overharvesting and habitat loss from conversion of its native forests to farms and plantations. The IUCN Red List assesses the species as Critically Endangered.

The species was first described by André Joseph Guillaume Henri Kostermans in 1982.
