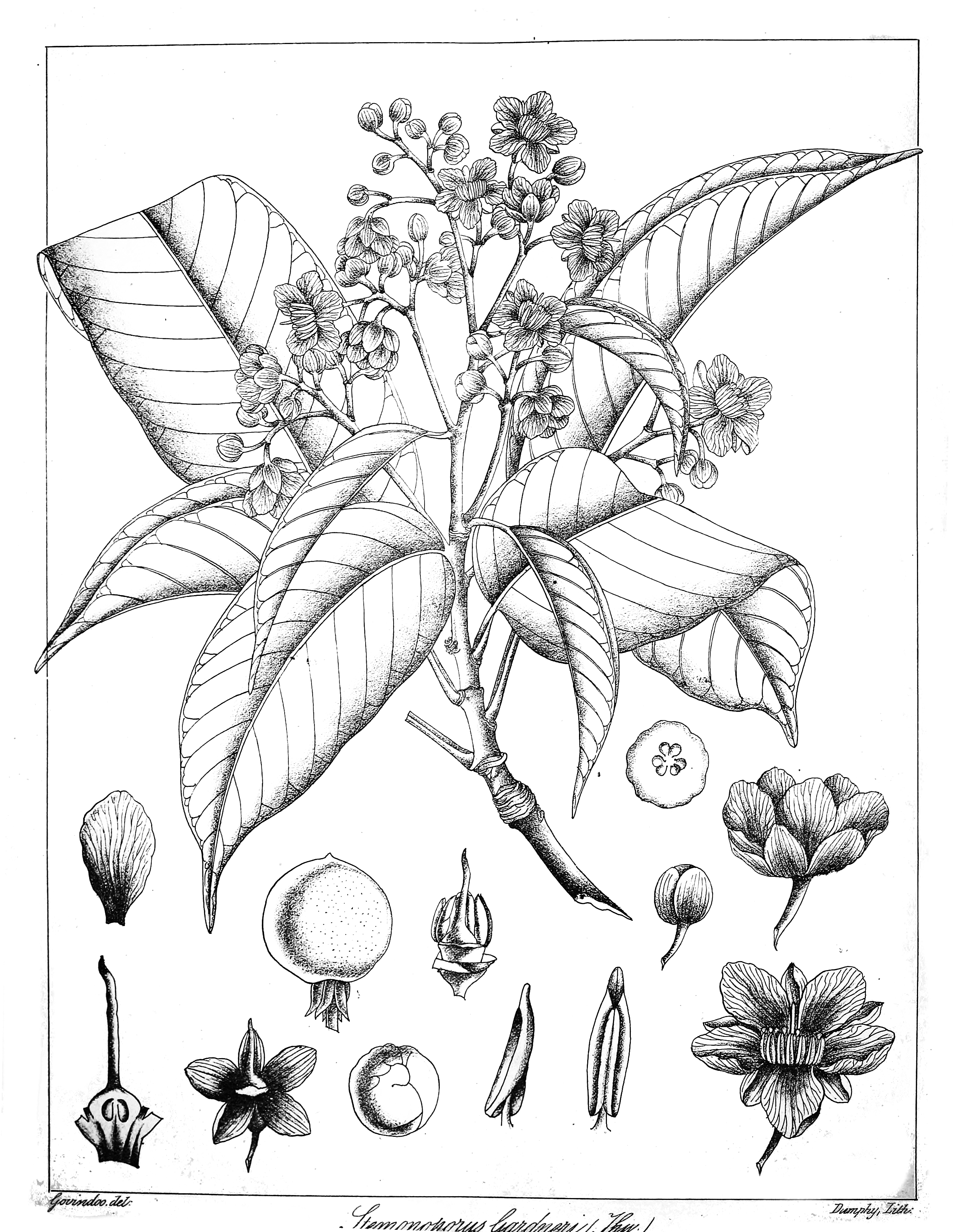

Conservation status
- Vulnerable (IUCN 3.1)

Scientific classification
- Kingdom: Plantae
- Clade: Tracheophytes
- Clade: Angiosperms
- Clade: Eudicots
- Clade: Rosids
- Order: Malvales
- Family: Dipterocarpaceae
- Genus: Stemonoporus
- Species: S. gardneri

Binomial name
- Stemonoporus gardneri Thwaites

Synonyms
- Vateria gardneri (Thwaites) Thwaites; Vatica gardneri (Thwaites) A.DC.

= Stemonoporus gardneri =

Species of tree

Stemonoporus gardneri is a species of flowering plant in the family Dipterocarpaceae. It is a tree endemic to southwestern Sri Lanka. It is native to the southern and eastern slopes of Adam's Peak and the upper elevations of Sinharaja Forest Reserve, where it dominates hill rain forest and sometimes extends into montane rain forest.

The species was first described by George Henry Kendrick Thwaites in 1854.
