= Royal Botanic Gardens, Peradeniya =

Botanical garden in Sri Lanka

Royal Botanic Gardens of Sri Lanka
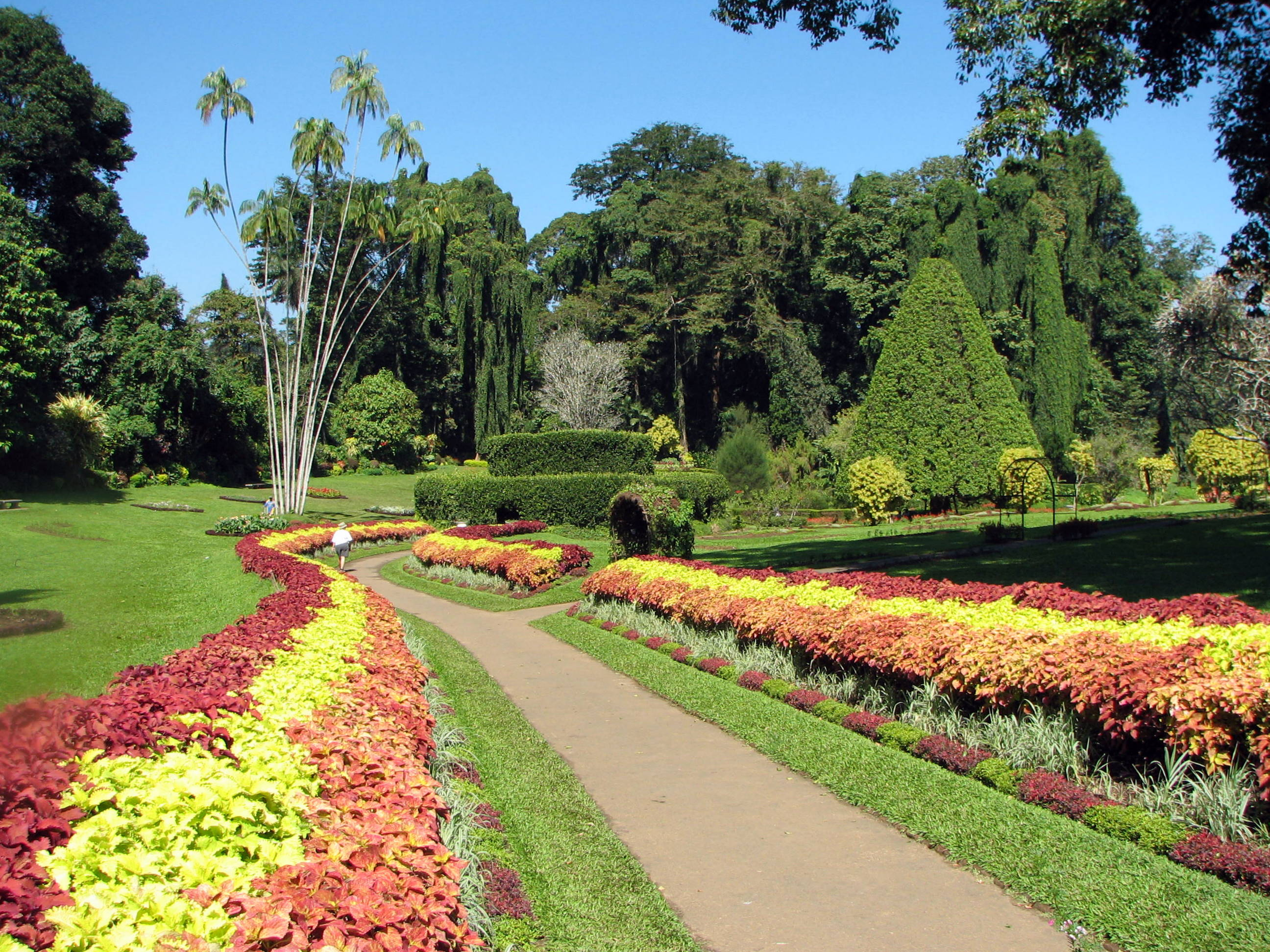
- Coleus border in the Flower garden near the Orchid house
- Interactive map of Royal Botanic Gardens of Sri Lanka
- Type: Botanical garden
- Location: Peradeniya, Sri Lanka
- Coordinates: 7°16′16″N 80°35′44″E
- Area: 147 acres (59 ha)
- Created: around 1750
- Operator: Department of National Botanic Gardens, Sri Lanka
- Status: Open all year
- Website: Department of National Botanic Gardens

Royal Botanic Gardens, Peradeniya are about 5.5 km to the west of the city of Kandy in the Central Province of Sri Lanka. In 2016, the garden was visited by 1.2 million locals and 400,000 foreign visitors. It is near the Mahaweli River (the longest river in Sri Lanka). It is renowned for its collection of orchids. The garden includes more than 4000 species of plants, including orchids, spices, medicinal plants and palm trees. Attached to it is the "National Herbarium of Sri Lanka". The total area of the botanical garden is 147 acres (0.59 km^{2}), at 460 meters above sea level, and with a 200-day annual rainfall. It is managed by the Department of national botanic gardens.

== History ==
The groundwork for a botanical garden was formed by Alexandar Moon in 1821. He used the garden for coffee and cinnamon plants. The Botanical Garden at Peradeniya was formally established in 1843 with plants brought from Kew Garden, Slave Island, Colombo, and the Kalutara Garden in Kalutara. The Royal Botanic Garden, Peradeniya was made more independent and expanded under George Gardner as superintendent in 1844. On Gardner's death in 1849 George Henry Kendrick Thwaites became superintendent. He served until he resigned in 1879, when he was succeeded by Henry Trimen, who served until 1895. He was succeeded in turn by John Christopher Willis who served as director from 1898 until 1912.

The garden came under the administration of the Department of Agriculture when it was established in 1912.

There are avenues in the River Drive such as Cook's Pine Avenue, Palmyra Palm Avenue, Double Coconut Avenue, Cabbage Palm Avenue, and Royal Palm Avenue. The classical Avenue of Palms is in this Garden. One item with a significant history is the Cannonball Tree planted by King George V of the United Kingdom and Queen Mary in 1901. It is often laden with fruit, which are thought to resemble cannonballs.

During World War II, the Botanic Garden was used by Lord Louis Mountbatten, the supreme commander of the allied forces in the South Asia, as the headquarters of the South East Asia Command.

The gardens were used as a location in the 1957 film The Bridge on the River Kwai.

== Flora ==
Here is the list of some plants growing in Royal Botanical Gardens:

- Araucaria columnaris
- Asplenium nidus
- Bambusa vulgaris
- Borassus flabellifer
- Calophyllum tomentosum
- Cinnamomum zeylanicum
- Coelogyne mayeriana
- Couroupita guianensis
- Cyperus papyrus
- Dendrocalamus giganteus
- Elettaria cardamomum
- Ficus benjamina
- Grammatophyllum speciosum
- Heliconia rostrata
- Jatropha podagrica
- Lodoicea maldivica
- Macrothelypteris torresiana
- Myristica fragrans
- Pimenta dioica
- Pimenta racemosa
- Piper nigrum
- Portulaca grandiflora
- Typhonodorum lindleyanum

== Gallery ==
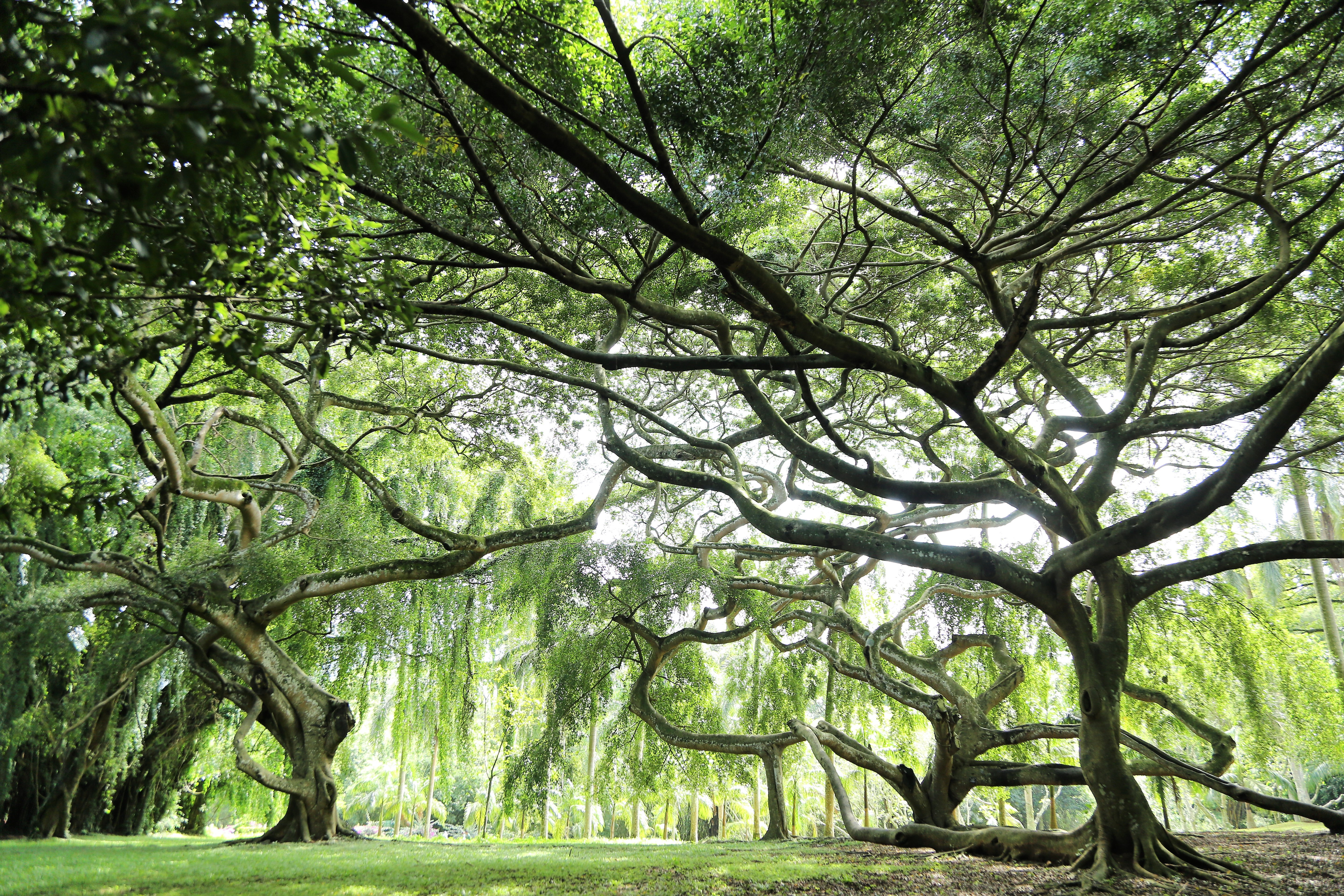
Java Fig Trees

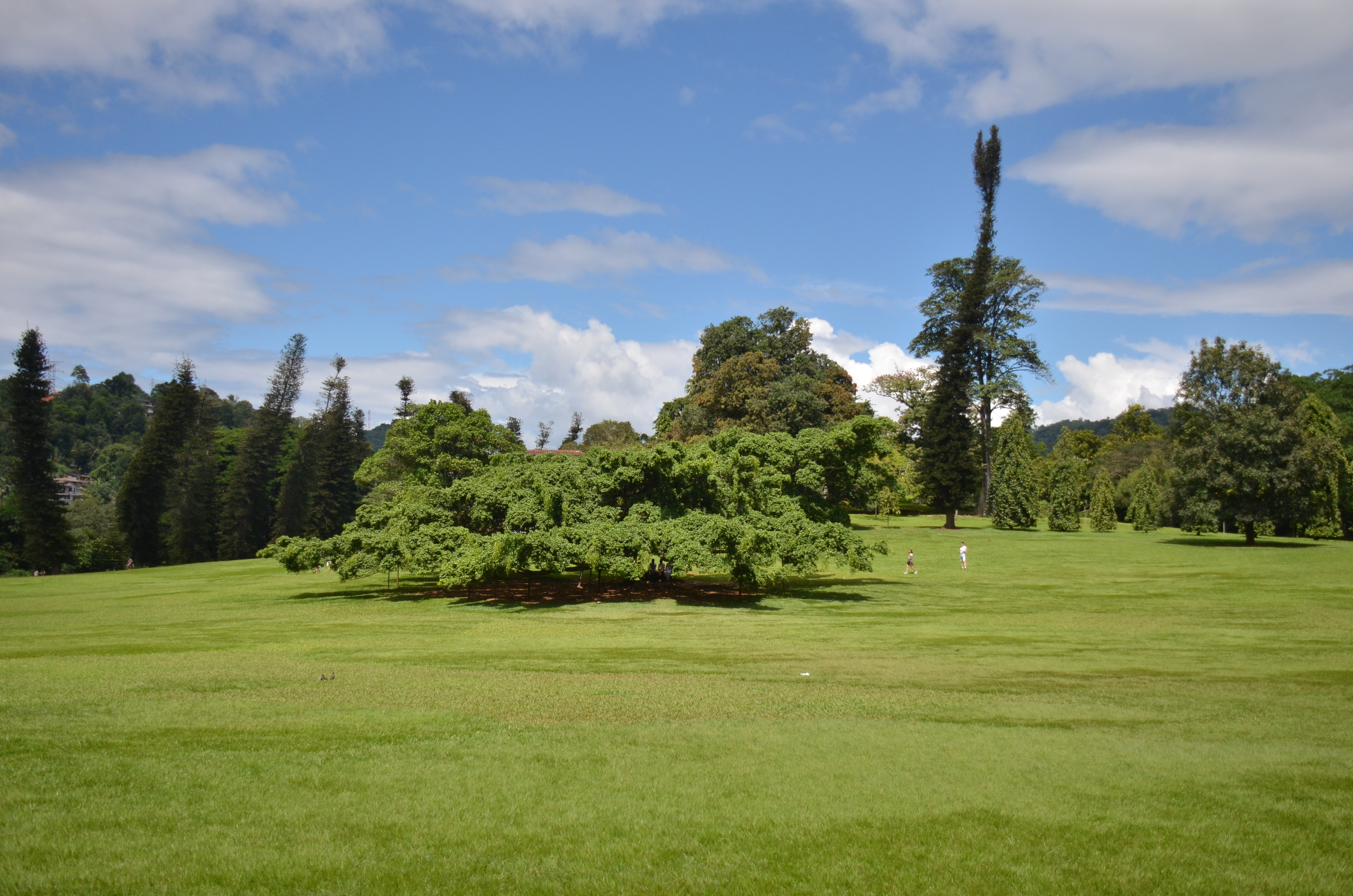
Java fig tree at the Great lawn

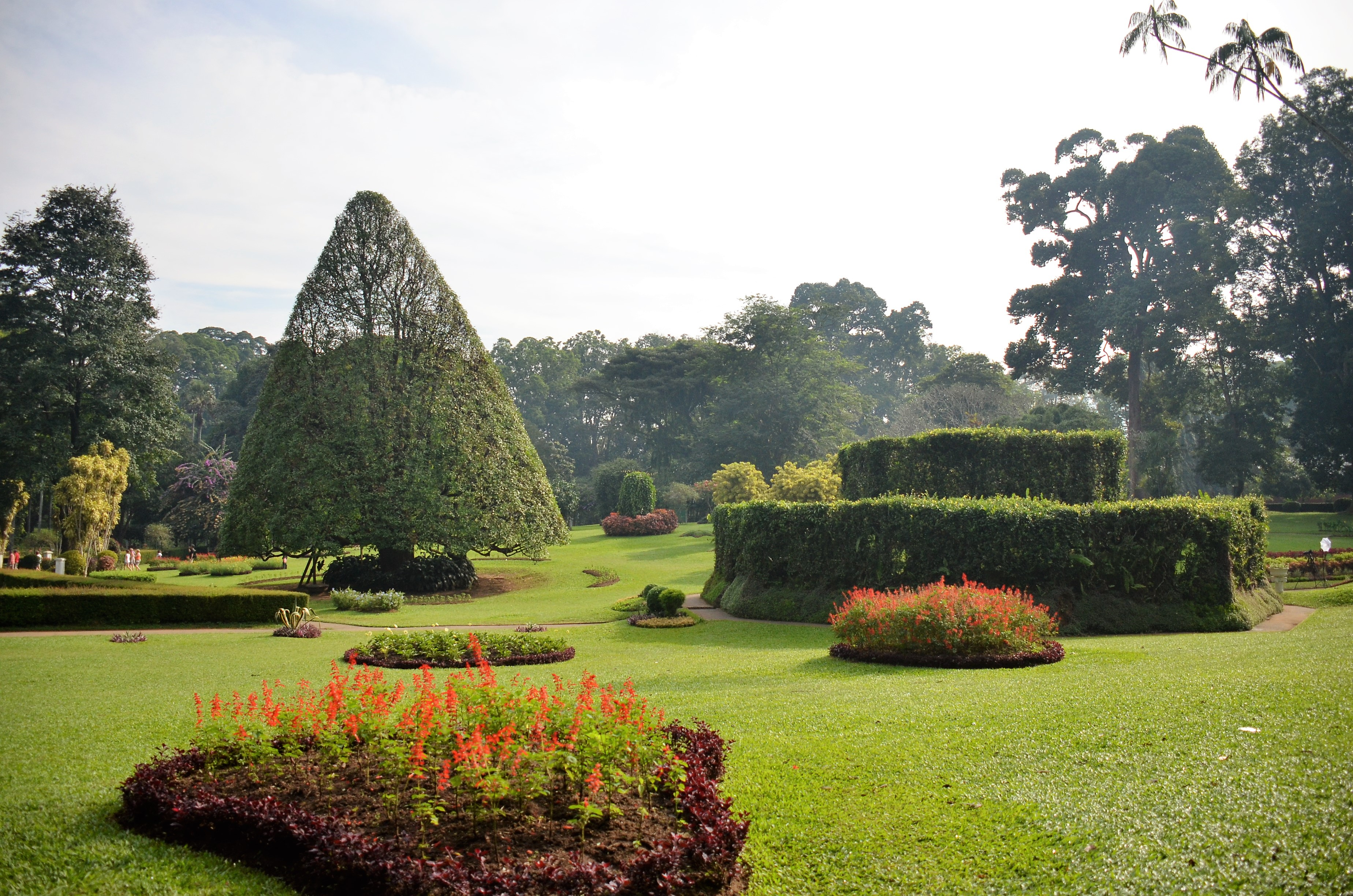
Flower garden

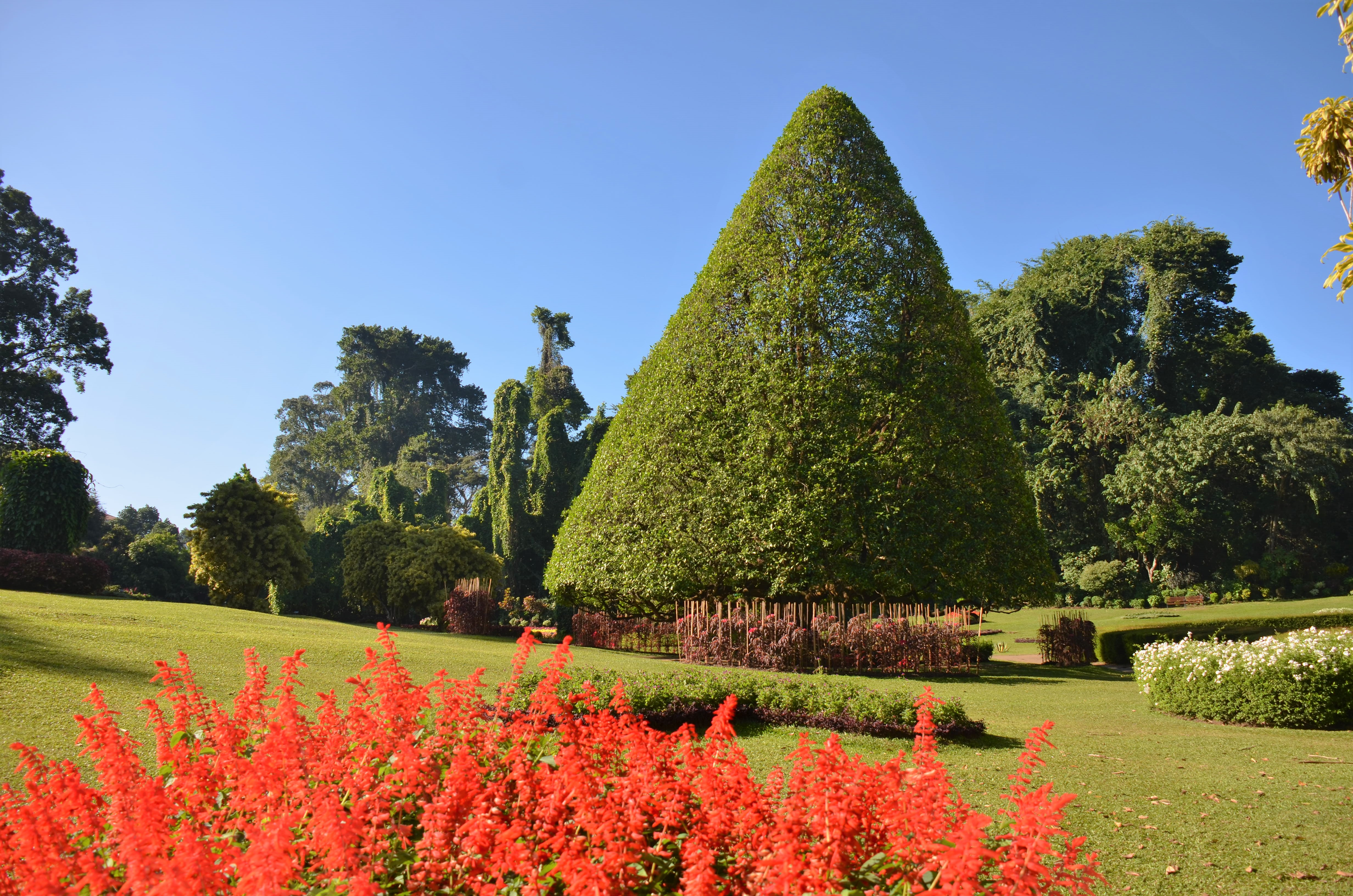
Flower garden

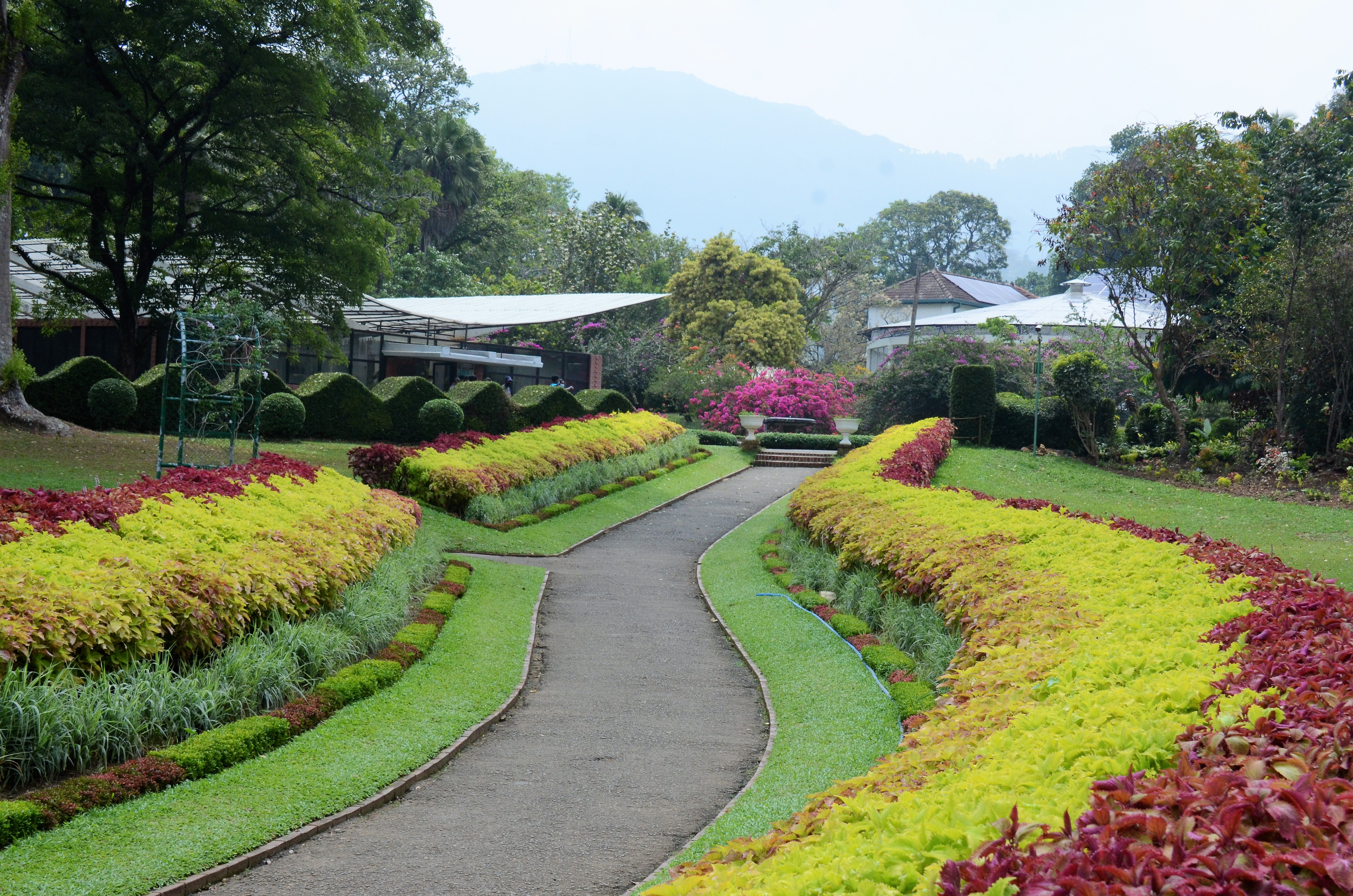
Coleus border

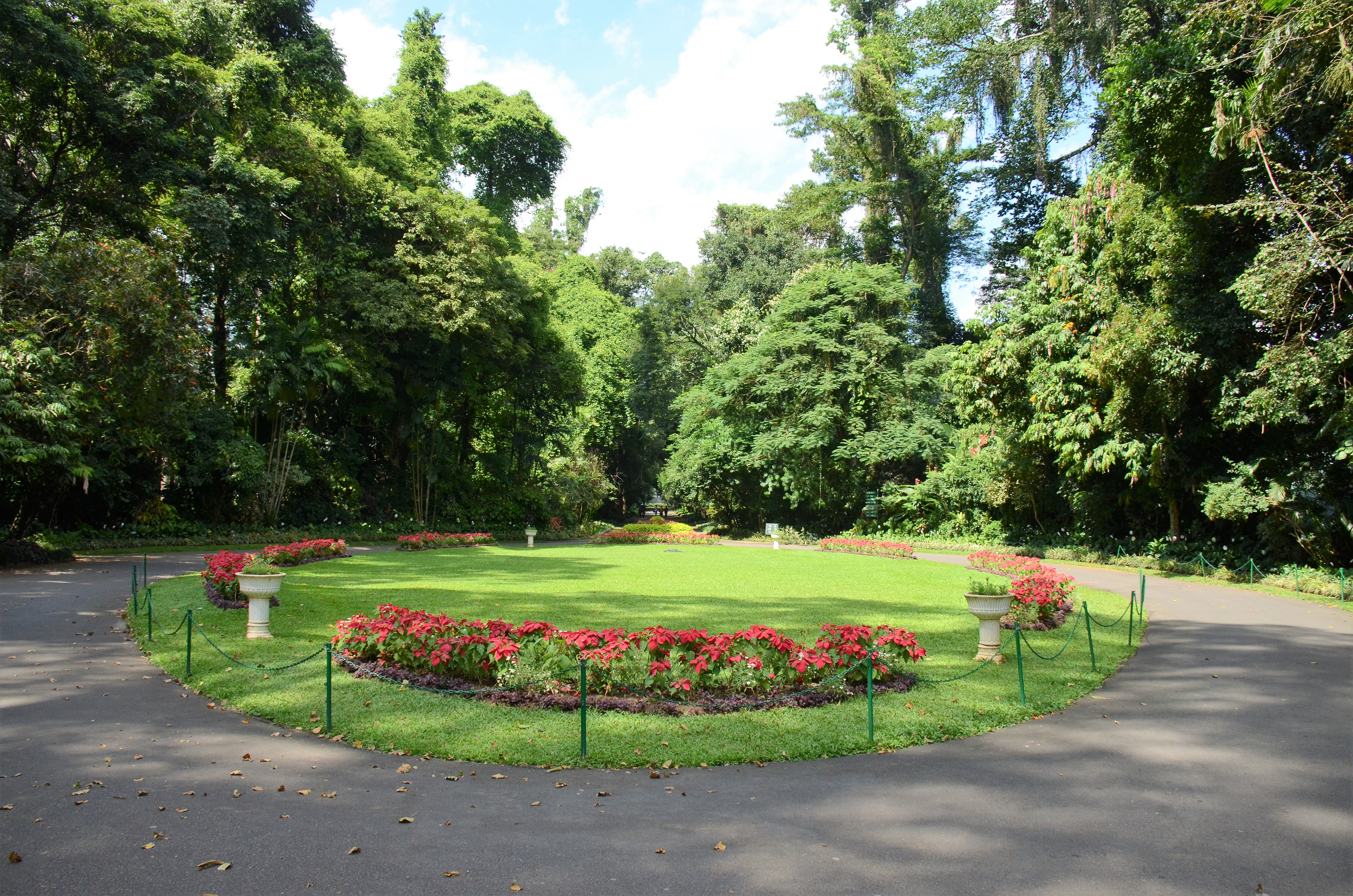
At the main gate

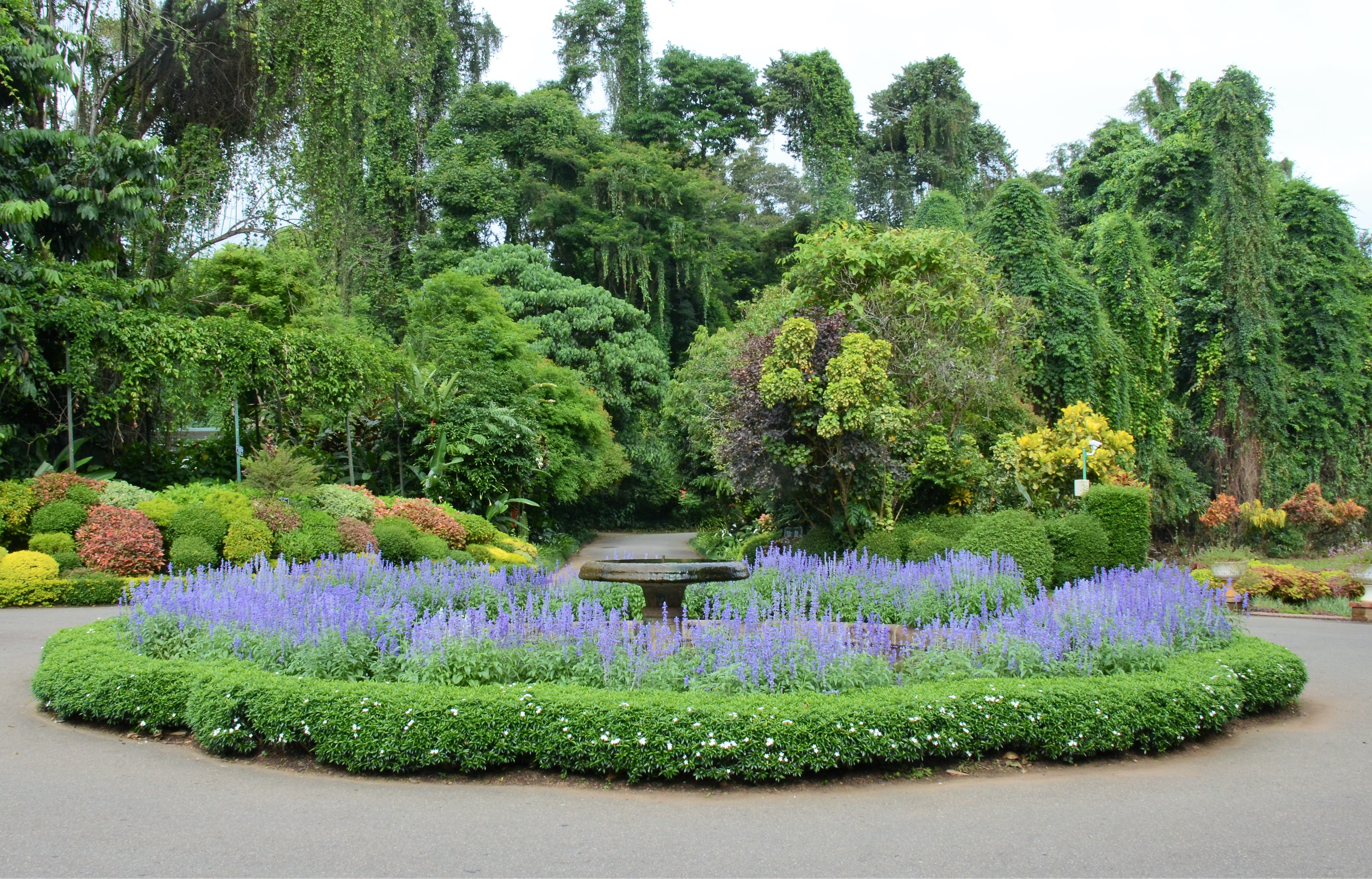
In front of the Orchid house

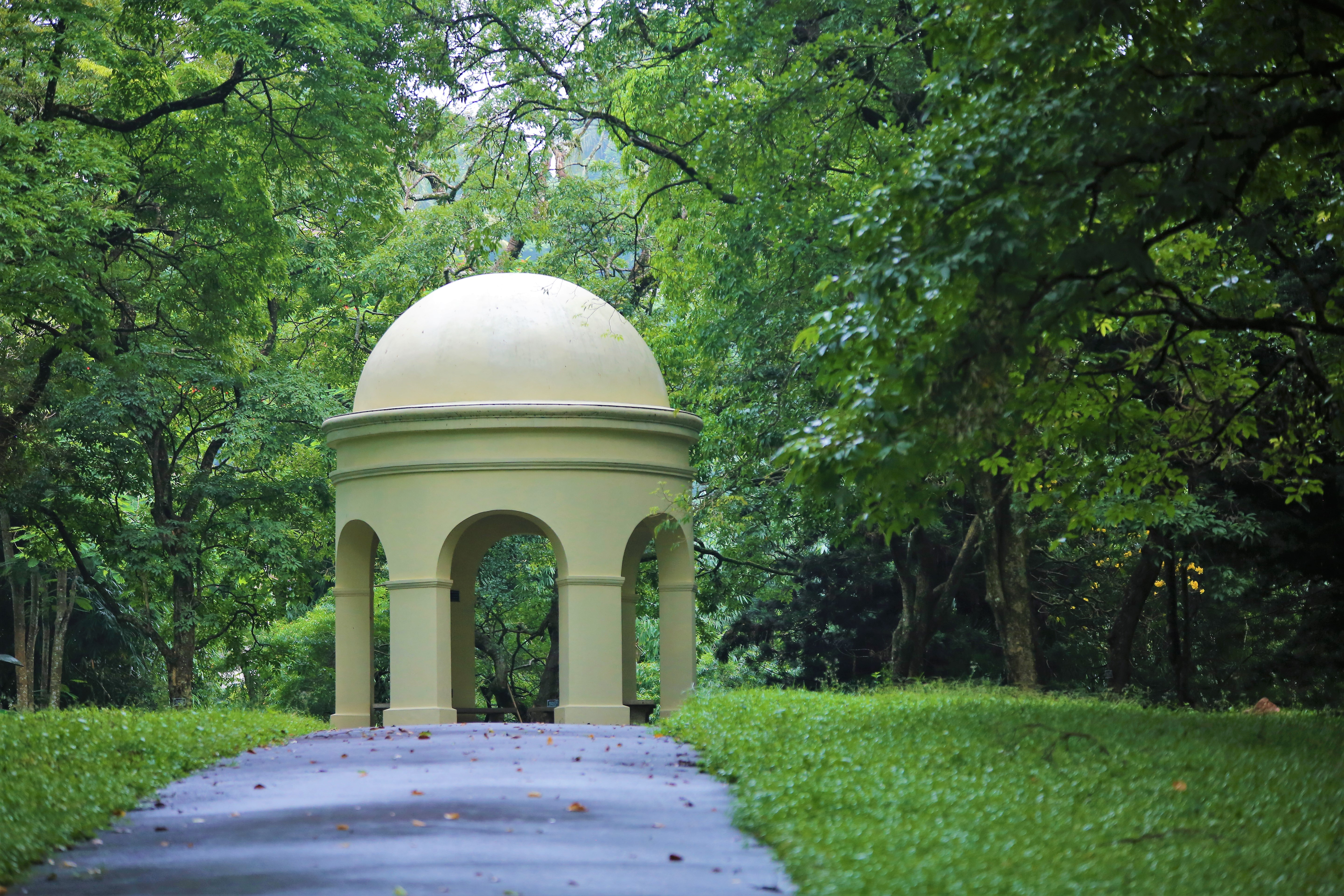
Gardner monument

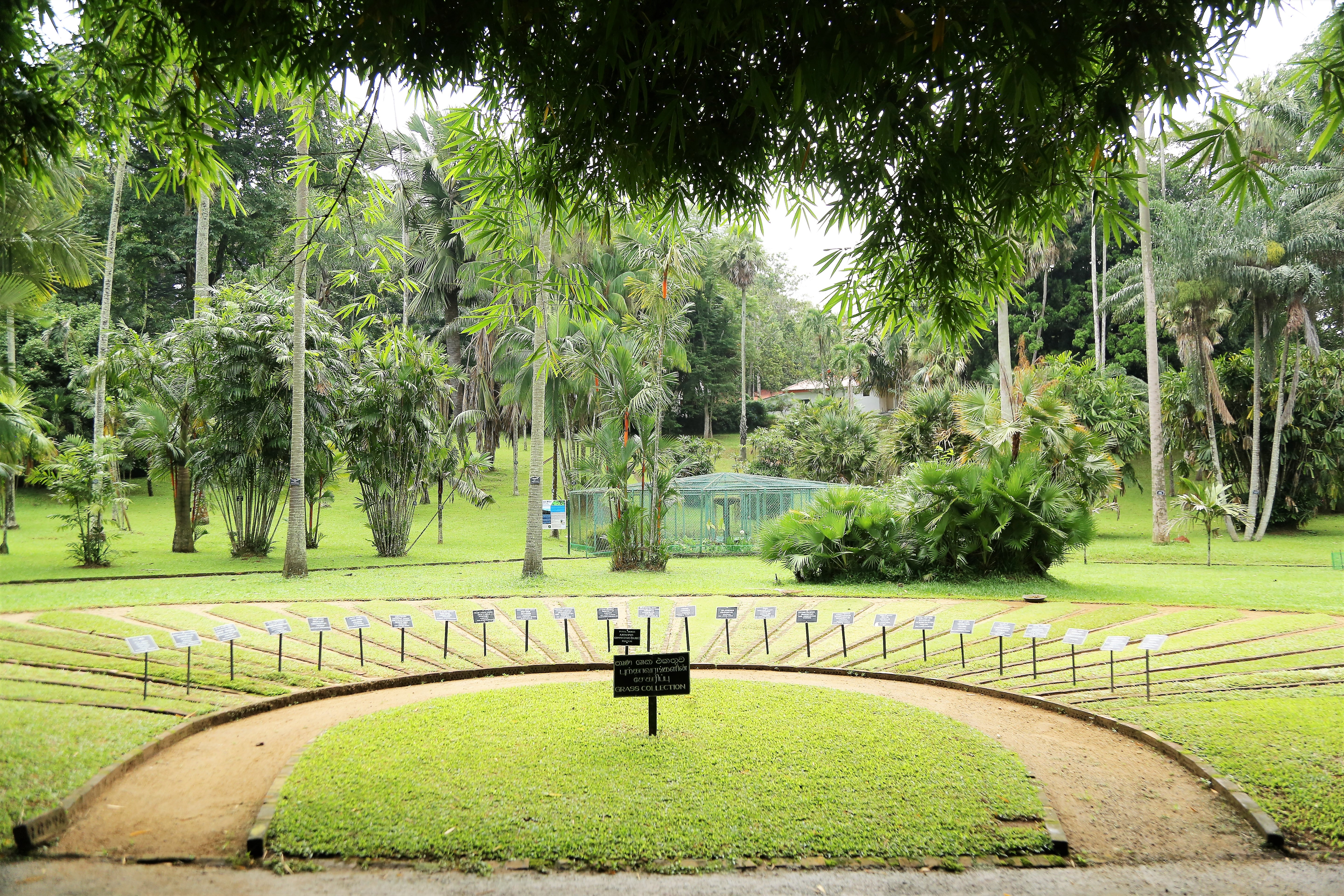
Collection of grasses

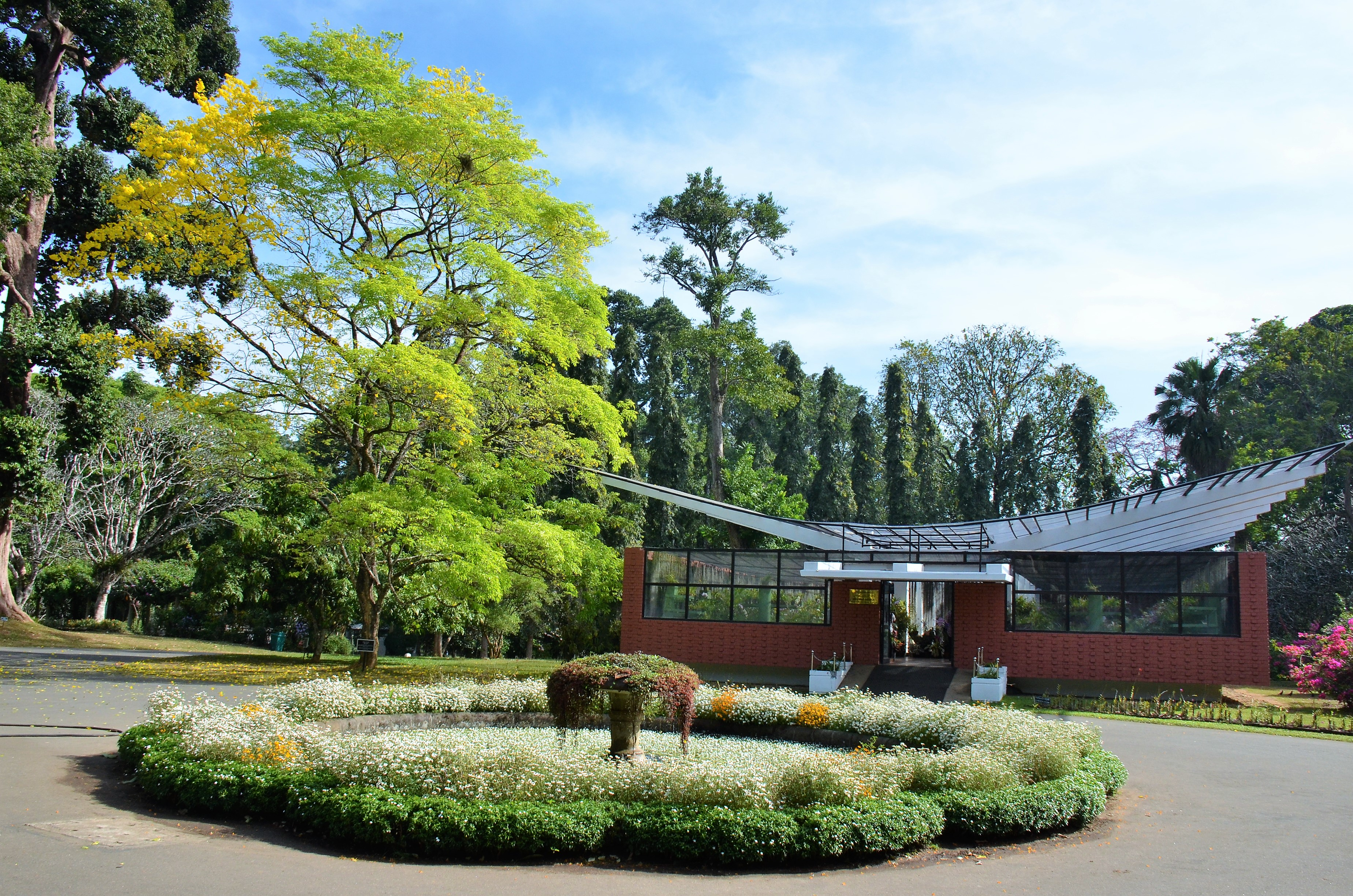
Orchid house

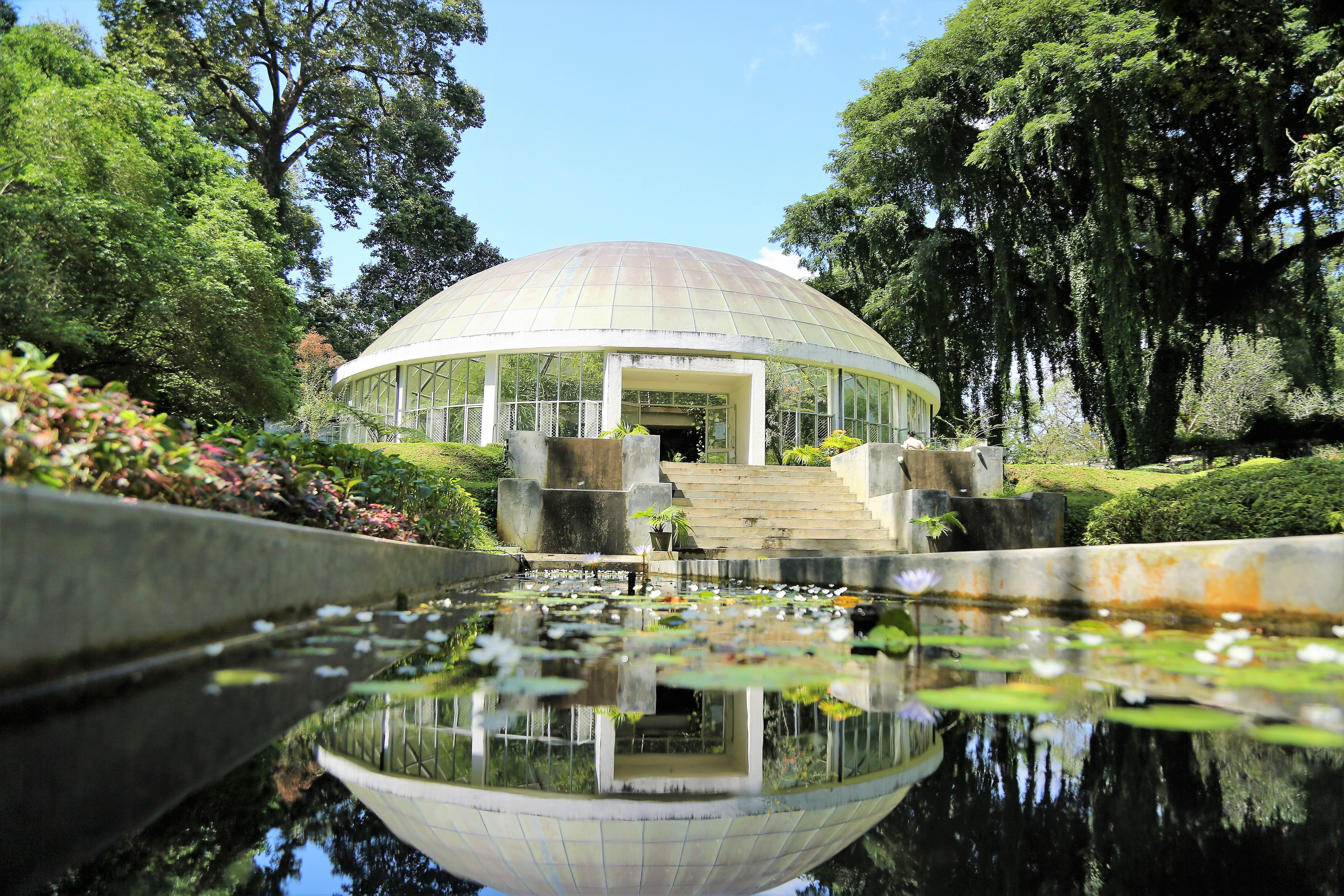
Conservatory near the Palmyra palm avenue

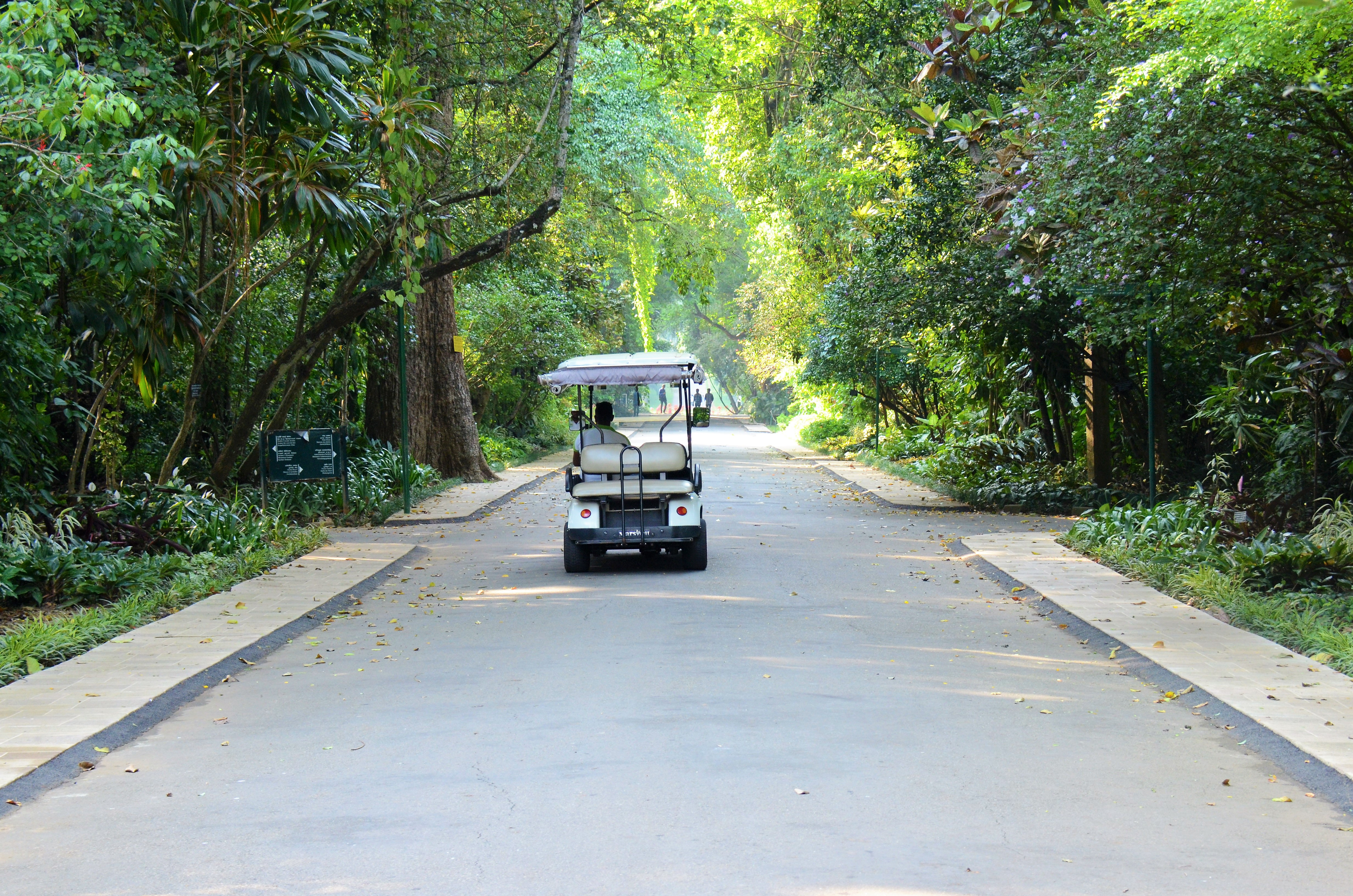
Main central drive

== Other botanic gardens in Sri Lanka ==
- Hakgala Botanical Garden
- Henarathgoda Botanical Garden7°06′00″N 79°59′10″E
- Mirijjawila Botanical Garden
- Seethawaka Botanical Garden, Avissawella6°57′11″N 80°13′06″E
- Medicinal Plant Gardens, Ganewatta near 7°39′25″N 80°22′09″E
