= Hakgala Botanical Garden =

Botanical garden in Sri Lanka

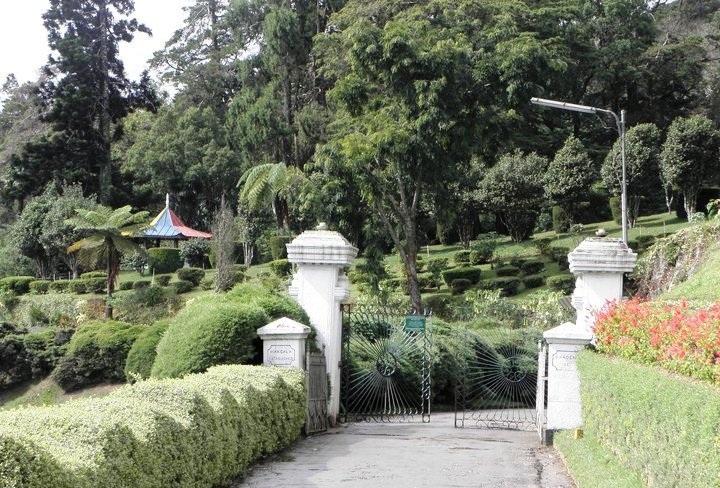
- Exit of the garden. Entrance now is a few meters down
- Interactive map of Hakgala Botanical Garden
- Type: Botanical garden
- Location: Hakgala, Nuwara Eliya
- Coordinates: 6°55′38.5″N 80°49′12.2″E
- Area: Nuwara Eliya
- Created: 1861
- Operator: Department of Agriculture, Sri Lanka
- Visitors: 563,586 (2023)
- Status: Open all year
- Website: Department of National Botanic Gardens

Hakgala Botanical Garden is one of the five botanical gardens in Sri Lanka. The other four are Peradeniya Botanical Garden, Henarathgoda Botanical Garden, Mirijjawila Botanical Garden and Seetawaka Botanical Garden. It is the second largest botanical garden in Sri Lanka. The garden is contiguous to Hakgala Strict Nature Reserve.

== Location and climate ==
Hakgala Botanical Garden is situated on the Nuwara Eliya-Badulla main road, 16 km from Nuwara Eliya and extends for about 28 hectares. The garden has a cool temperate climate because its altitude is 5,500 feet above sea level. The mean annual temperature ranges between 16 °C to 30 °C during the course of a year. From December to February, it has a cold climate, while the warm climate persists from April to August.

== History ==
The garden was established in 1861, under George Henry Kendrick Thwaites as an experimental cultivation of cinchona, a commercial crop thriving at the time. Once after tea replaced the cinchona, it was turned into an experimental tea cultivation. In 1884 it transformed into a garden. Since then many subtropical and some temperate plants have been planted in the gardens.

== Visitor attraction ==
Over 10,000 species of flora are planted here and during the spring season in Nuwara Eliya, thousands of visitors come to see the blooms here. The garden is famous for several species of orchids and roses present in this garden. In 2023, 548,742 domestic and 14,844 foreign tourists visited the garden.

== See Also ==
- Peradeniya Botanical Garden
- Mirijjawila Botanical Garden
- Henarathgoda Botanical Garden
