= Mirijjawila Botanical Garden =

Botanical garden in Sri Lanka

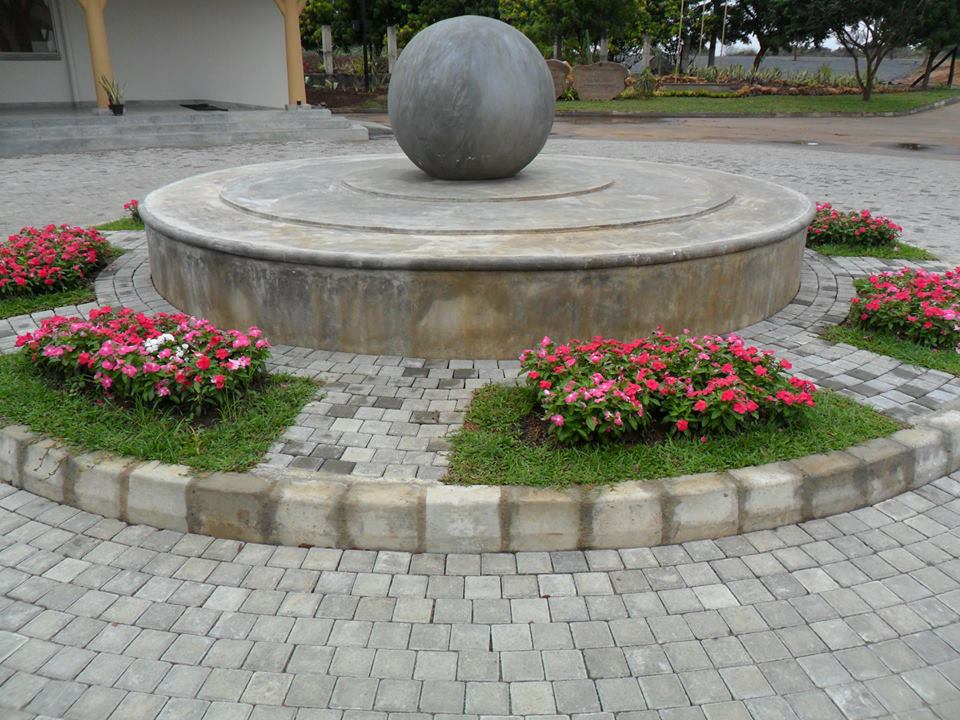
- Entrance of the garden
- Interactive map of Mirijjawila Botanical Garden
- Type: Botanical garden
- Location: Hambantota, Sri Lanka
- Coordinates: 6°7′27″N 81°7′21″E
- Area: 300 acres
- Created: 2013 November 14
- Operator: Department of National Botanic Gardens, Sri Lanka
- Status: Open all year

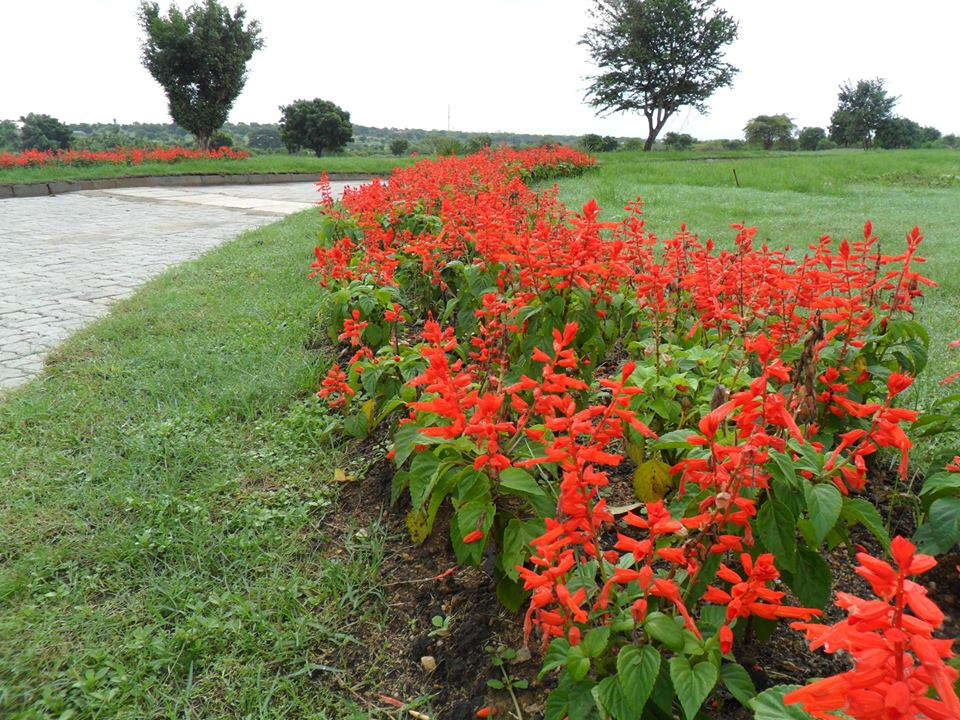
a scenic picture of the garden

Mirijjawila Botanical Garden is one of the five botanical gardens in Sri Lanka. The other botanical gardens are Peradeniya Botanical Garden, Hakgala Botanical Garden, Henarathgoda Botanical Garden and Seetawaka Botanical Garden.

== Location ==
Mirijjawila Botanical Garden is located on the Colombo-Kataragama main road. It has the Mattala International Airport on its left side and the Hambantota Harbour on its right side.

== Construction ==
This land was covered with thorny shrubs and abandoned chena lands, when it allocated for this purpose in 2006. Three water tanks named Kohombagas wewa, Malitthangas wewa and demataththa wewa, are constructed in the garden premises to preserve the moisture of the land.

The total area of the botanical garden is about 300 acres.

== Purpose of the garden ==
In summary, the objectives of establishing this botanical garden is:

- Ex-situ conservation of dry and arid zone plants of Sri Lanka.
- Dry zone landscape improvement.
- Ecotourism promotion.
- Providing knowledge and training on botany and floriculture.
- Promoting medicinal herbs.
- Studies on lesser known and under utilized plants in the dry zone.

== See also ==
- Peradeniya Botanical Garden
- Hakgala Botanical Garden
- Henarathgoda Botanical Garden
