= Kendrickia walkeri =

Scientific classification
- Kingdom: Plantae
- Clade: Tracheophytes
- Clade: Angiosperms
- Clade: Eudicots
- Clade: Rosids
- Order: Myrtales
- Family: Melastomataceae
- Genus: Kendrickia; Hook.f.
- Species: K. walkeri

Binomial name
- Kendrickia walkeri Hook.f.

Synonyms
- Kendrickia walkeri (Thwaites) Hook.f. ex Triana; Medinilla walkeri Gardner; Pachycentria walkeri Thwaites

Species of flowering plant

Kendrickia is a monotypic genus of flowering plants belonging to the family Melastomataceae. It only contains one species, Kendrickia walkeri.

Its native range is India and Sri Lanka.

The genus name of Kendrickia is in honour of George Henry Kendrick Thwaites (1811–1882), an English botanist and entomologist. Both genus and species were first described and published in 1867.
