= Henarathgoda Botanical Garden =

Botanical garden in Gampaha, Sri Lanka

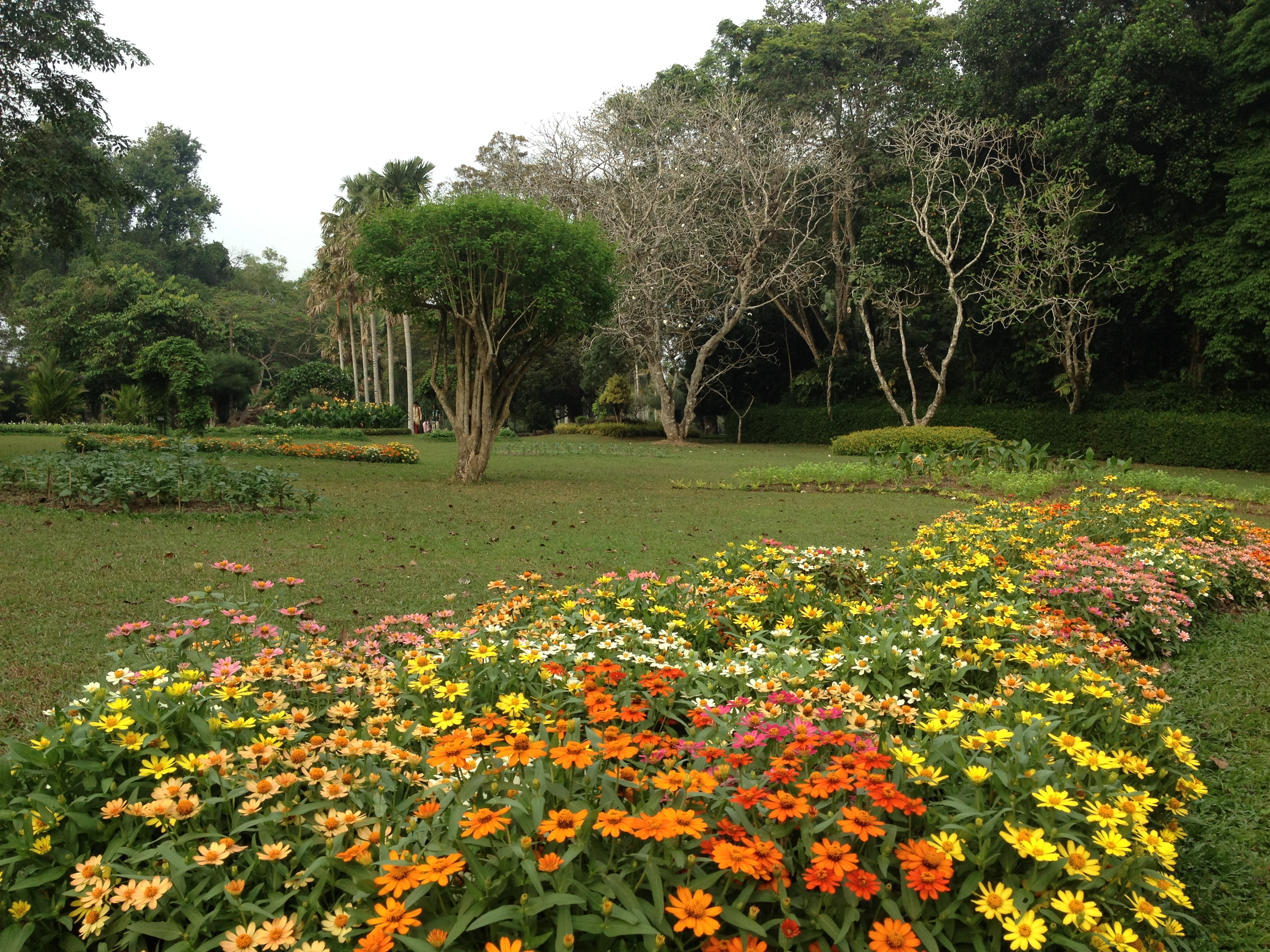
- Interactive map of Henarathgoda Botanical Garden
- Type: Botanical garden
- Location: Gampaha, Sri Lanka
- Coordinates: 7°06′00″N 79°59′10″E
- Area: 17.8 hectares (44 acres)
- Elevation: 10m
- Created: 1876; 150 years ago
- Operator: Department of National Botanic Gardens, Sri Lanka
- Status: Open all year
- Plants: 2,000 (Appx:)
- Species: 400 (Appx:)

Henarathgoda Botanical Garden, also known as Gampaha Botanical Garden, is one of the six botanical gardens in Sri Lanka. The botanical garden is situated on the Gampaha-Minuwangoda main road, approximately 450 m (1,480 ft) away from Gampaha railway station. It is about 29 km (18 mi) from Sri Lanka's commercial capital of Colombo.

It was established in 1876 by the British to conduct experiments on exotic economic plants such as Rubber, and explore plant wealth and development of economy in the colony. The first imported rubber tree to Sri Lanka was first planted in this garden and it was the first seedlings of Brazilian rubber tree ever planted in Asia. The garden consists of a large variety of plants and many of them are from every corner of the tropical world it is expanding over 43 acres (0.17 km^{2}) and situated next to the Attanagalu Oya and surrounded by paddy fields, a man-made green environment and a secondary forest as well laid out with many interesting sections, eye-catching landscaping and many shrubs, bushes and trees. This garden is a famous destination for youngsters.

== History ==
In 1825 Governor Edward Barnes planted an extensive garden at this location, on the banks of the Kelani River.

During the 19th century British naturalists made various studies about botany along with other sciences. One of their interests was the finding of possibility of establishing rubber yielding plants in Asia. They planted various rubber yielding plants both in India and Ceylon, including Para rubber (Hevea brasiliensis), Gutta percha (Palaquium gutta), Panama rubber (Castilea elastica), Balatta (Mimusops globesa) and Lagos (Funtumia elastica). The British naturalists concentrated their trials to Ceylon due to the failure of rubber trials in India and discovered that Ceylon offers the same environmental condition as that of the Amazon.

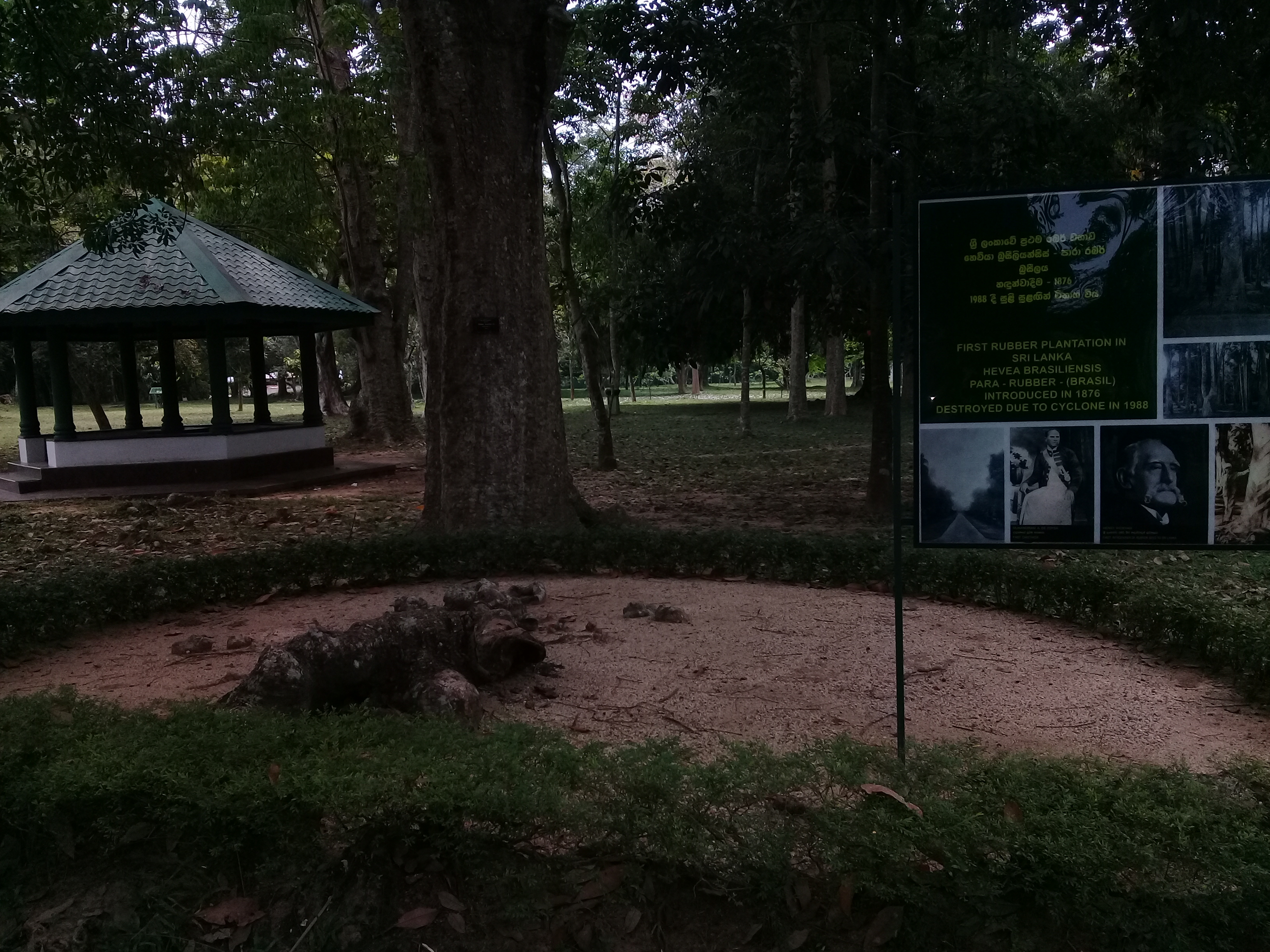
First Rubber Plant in Sri Lanka at Henarathgoda Botanical Garden

In 1876, 1,919 rubber seedlings, originally collected from the Amazon forest (Santarém, Pará, Brazil) by explorer Sir Henry Alexander Wickham, were imported from the Royal Botanic Gardens, Kew and planted at the Gampaha gardens, under the guidance of George Thwaites, the superintendent of the botanical gardens at Peradeniya. At these times the garden was laid out and managed by Muhandiram Amaris De Zoysa under the supervision of the director of the Royal Botanic Gardens, Peradeniya.

The trees blossomed in 1880 and from the next year Rubber seeds were distributed throughout the country as well as some other British colonies in South and Southeast Asia (particularly South India, Malaysia, and Myanmar). Remnants of these first Rubber trees are now protected as a national monument. Forest Department, Sri Lanka(1887) was responsible for all major plant introductions for economic and environmental development in the Henarathgoda Botanical Garden.

Activities that followed resulted in the development of economic and plantation crops, emergence of important state departments such as Department of Agriculture (1912) and institutions for the development of Plantation Crops such as Rubber. In 1919 the world first rubber exhibition was held at the Royal Botanical Gardens, Peradeniya.

Later the garden was developed as a standard Botanical Garden by adding and developing new plants and sections. Many of these trees of the 19th century are still available in the garden. The oldest rubber tree in the gardens collapsed following a severe rain storm in 1988 and the remaining trees are now preserved as a national monument of the country.

Original extent of gardens was about 36 acres (0.15 km^{2}) in extent an additional 7 acres (0.03 km^{2}) was added in 2005. It now serves as a tropical low country Botanic Garden and after the establishment of Department of national Botanic Gardens in 2006, the Henarathgoda Botanical Garden functions as a division under it.

== Garden ==
The altitude of garden is about 10 m (33 ft) above the sea level. It has a tropical low-country climate. The total area of the botanical garden is about 15 ha (37 acres) and recently it acquired another 2.8 ha (6.9 acres) for its expansion.

== Visitor attraction ==
The newest additions to the 150-year-old botanical garden include boat rides at the Attanagalu Oya and a bridge over the river. The garden hosts an extensive collection of palms, orchids and trees endemic to the country. The garden is also home to nearly 80 bird species including ten endemic species, 18 species of mammals including Sri Lankan flying squirrel (Petaurista philippensis) and 12 species of butterflies and 10 species of dragonflies. It is divided into an orchid garden, which hosts a rare specimen of Queen of Orchids (Cattleya), forest path, palms garden, Japanese garden, educational garden and a medicinal garden, which houses a collection of trees producing arrow poison from Africa and Malaya such as Antiaris toxicaria. Although the garden is open to the public throughout the year, the best period to visit the botanical garden is following the monsoon season which leaves the foliage brimming with vibrancy and in numerable blooms.

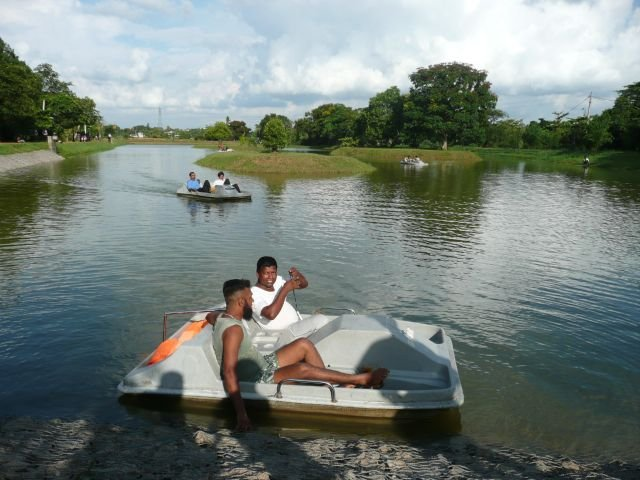
Boat riding at the lake in the Henarathgoda Botanical Garden

== Botanical research ==
As one of the island's most renowned institutions for conservation, the Henarathgoda Botanical Garden is also actively engaged in the development and education of the country's floriculture and botanical research.

== Location ==
Henarathgoda Botanic Garden is situated about 18 miles (29 km) north-west of Colombo and within 1 kilometre (1,100 yd) from the Gampaha Railway Station, and not more than 500 yards (460 m) from the Gampaha-Minuwangoda road.

== See also ==
- Peradeniya Botanical Garden
- Hakgala Botanical Garden
- Mirijjawila Botanical Garden
