= Arthur Hugh Garfit Alston =

English botanist (1902-1958)

- Born: 4 September 1902; West Ashby, UK
- Died: 17 March 1958 (aged 55); Barcelona, Spain
- Scientific career
- Fields: Botany
- Author abbrev. (botany): Alston

Arthur Hugh Garfit Alston (born in West Ashby on 4 September 1902; died in Barcelona on 17 March 1958) was an English botanist.

== Education and career ==
His father was a vicar and amateur naturalist who first got him interested in the field. A.H.G. Alston later received his B.A. from the University of Oxford. He went on to work at the Royal Botanic Gardens, Kew and the colonial Department of Agriculture in Ceylon. He joined the Linnean Society of London in 1927. This botanist is denoted by the author abbreviation Alston when citing a botanical name.
