= Henry Trimen =

British botanist (1843–1896)

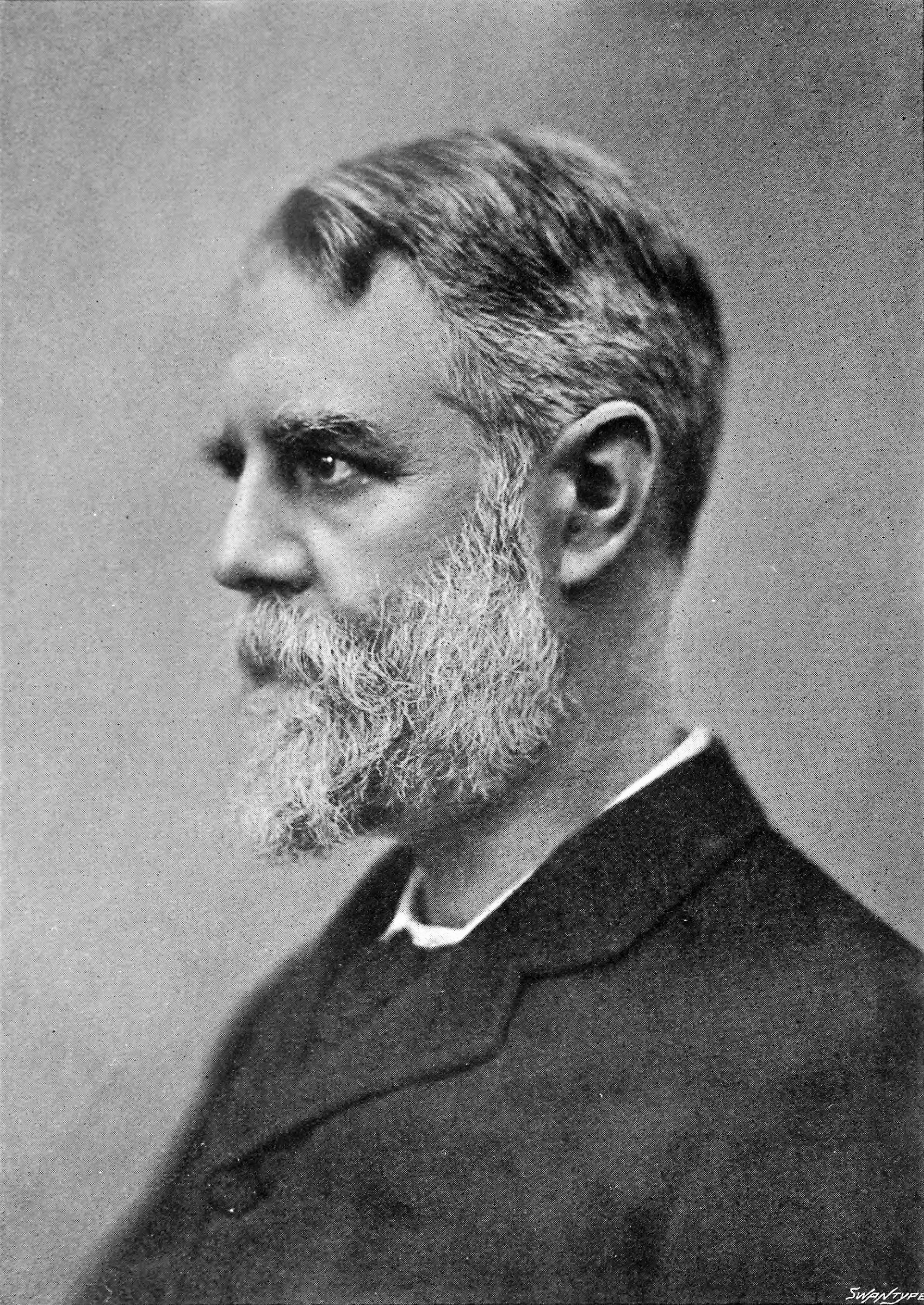
- In 1887
- Born: 26 October 1843; Paddington, London, England
- Died: 16 October 1896 (aged 52); Kandy, Ceylon
- Citizenship: British
- Scientific career
- Fields: Botany
- Author abbrev. (botany): Trimen

Henry Trimen (26 October 1843 – 16 October 1896) was a British botanist who worked in Sri Lanka. He named several plants in the family Dipterocarpaceae.

== Life ==
Trimen was born in Park Place, Paddington, London, England, the son of Richard and Marinne Trimen and the younger brother of entomologist Roland Trimen. He graduated from King's College School, London and from King's College Medical School, Edinburgh, but never practiced medicine.

Like his brother Roland, he collected all kinds of natural history specimens but later restricted himself to plants. He began medical studied in 1860 and spent some time in 1864 at the University of Edinburgh acting as a clinical assistant to Professor Bennett. He also became a friend of Professor J.H. Balfour at the Edinburgh Botanical Society. Trimen took part in reforms of the Linnean Society in 1872 and included dates of publication at the backs of the Journal of Botany where he served as editor. He was the curator of the medical museum at King's College, London, and lecturer on Botany at St Mary's Hospital Medical School from 1867 to 1872. He joined the botanical department of the British Museum in 1869.

He was the director of the Royal Botanic Gardens in Ceylon (now the Botanical Garden of Peradeniya, Sri Lanka) for 16 years where he succeeded George Henry Kendrick Thwaites. In 1883 he took part in the Cinchona project in the Nilgiris. While there, he founded the Museum of Economic Botany and also created subsidiary Gardens at Badulla and Anuradhapura. His major work at this time was The Flora of Ceylon, which was finished by others after his death.

He became Fellow of the Royal Society in 1888. He was also a Fellow of the Linnean Society of London. He died in Kandy in 1896.
