= George Henry Kendrick Thwaites =

English botanist and entomologist (1812–1882)

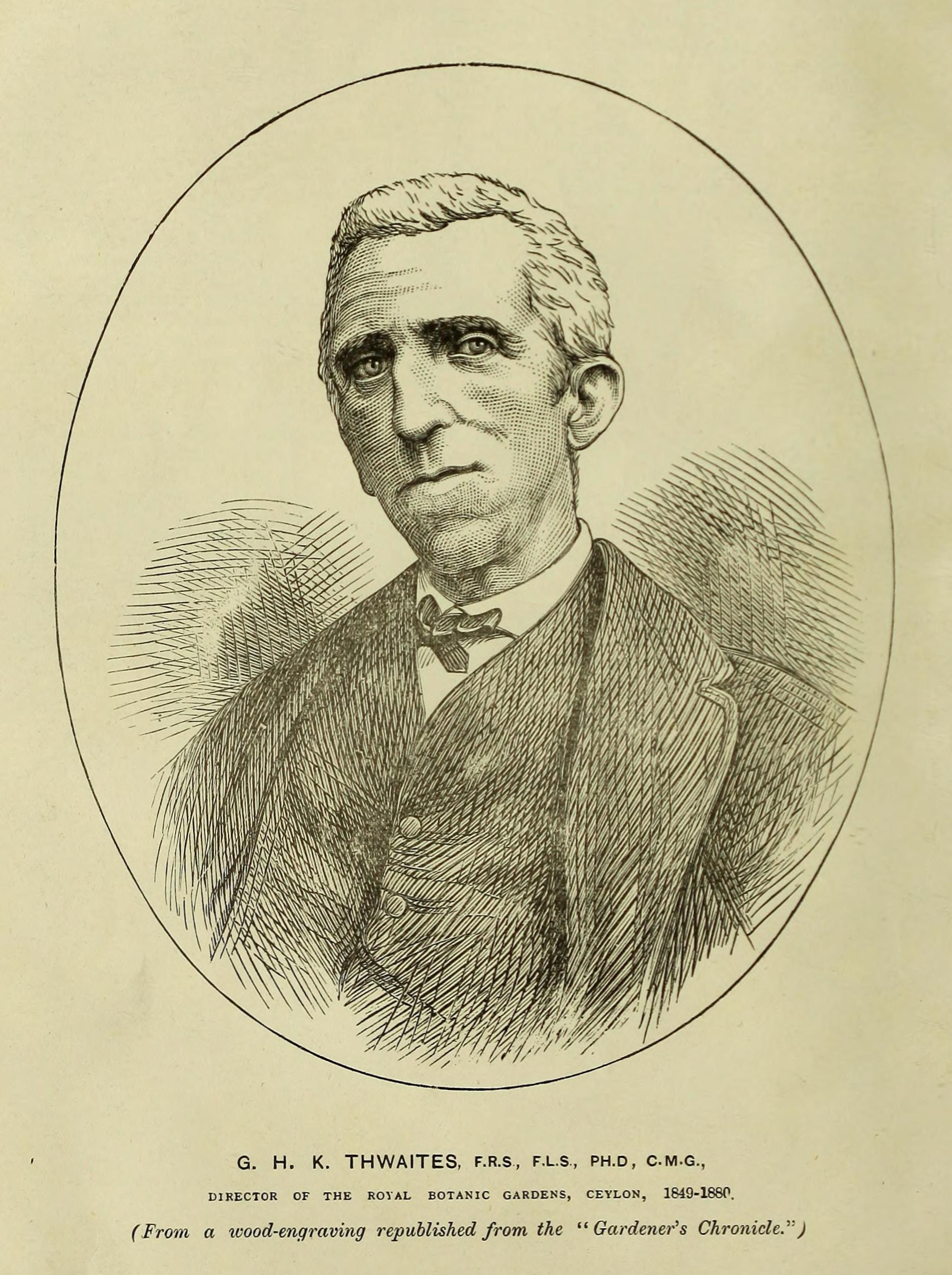
- Born: 9 July 1812; Bristol
- Died: 11 September 1882 (aged 70); Kandy
- Citizenship: United Kingdom
- Known for: Enumeratio Plantarum Zeylaniæ; Lepidoptera of Ceylon
- Scientific career
- Fields: Botany; Entomology
- Institutions: Bristol School of Pharmacy; Royal Botanical Gardens, Peradeniya; Hakgala Botanical Garden

George Henry Kendrick Thwaites CMG FRS FLS (9 July 1812, Bristol – 11 September 1882, Kandy) was an English botanist and entomologist.

== Career ==
Thwaites was initially an accountant and studied botany during his spare time. He was interested particularly in the lower plants such as the algae and the cryptogams. He became a recognised botanist when he showed that the diatoms are not animals, but algae. In 1846 he was lecturer on botany at the Bristol school of pharmacy and afterwards at the medical school. In March 1849, on the death of George Gardner, Thwaites was appointed superintendent of the botanical gardens at Peradeniya, Ceylon. A position he held for thirty years, until he resigned in 1879.

He was made a Fellow of the Royal Society on 1 June 1865 following the publication of his Enumeratio Plantarum Zeylaniæ, – (five fasciculi 1859–64). His notes form the most valuable portion of Frederic Moore's Lepidoptera of Ceylon (3 vols 1880–1889). He established the Cinchona nurseries, Hakgala, Ceylon and was in the board of directors of the Alfred Model Farm Experimental Station that later became the Royal Colombo Golf Course.

== Legacy ==
The flowering plant genus Kendrickia (from India and Sri Lanka), and the spider genus Thwaitesia are named after him.

Also, a species of Sri Lankan lizard, Chalcidoseps thwaitesi, and a butterfly Tapena thwaitesi, are named in his honor.

Specimens collected by Thwaites are cared for at multiple institutions, including the Natural History Museum, London, Plantentuin Meise, the National Herbarium of Victoria, Royal Botanic Gardens Victoria, and Kew Herbarium.
