= Lunugamvehera National Park =

National park in Sri Lanka

- ලුණුගම්වෙහෙර ජාතික වනෝද්‍යානය
- IUCN category II (national park)
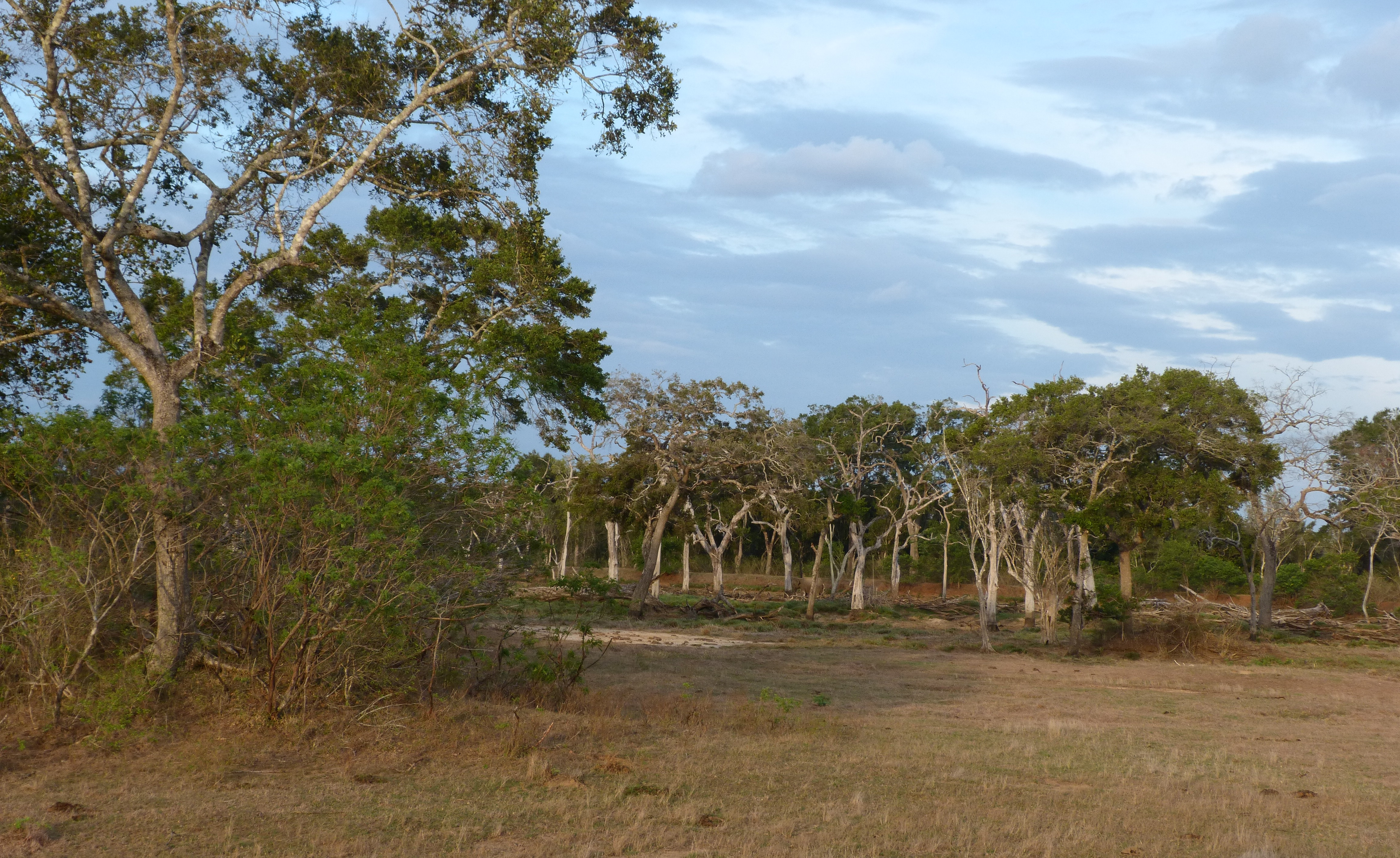
- Landscape with elephant at Lunugamvehera National Park

- Location within Sri Lanka
- Location: Uva province, Monaragala district, Sri Lanka
- Nearest city: Thanamalwila
- Coordinates: 6°27′37″N 81°12′37″E
- Area: 23,498.8 ha (58,067 acres)
- Established: December 8, 1995
- Governing body: Department of Wildlife Conservation

Lunugamvehera National Park (Sinhala: ලුණුගම්වෙහෙර ජාතික වනෝද්‍යානය) in Sri Lanka was declared in 1995, with the intention of protecting the catchment area of the Lunugamvehera reservoir and wildlife of the area. The national park is an important habitat for water birds and elephants. The catchment area is vital to maintain the water levels of the five tanks in the down stream of Kirindi Oya and wetland characteristics of Bundala National Park. This national park also serves as a corridor for elephants to migrate between Yala National Park and Udawalawe National Park. The national park is situated 261 km (162 mi) southwest from Colombo. After being closed because of the Sri Lankan civil war, the national park is now open to the general public.

== Physical features ==
Lunugamvehera is in the Dry zone of Sri Lanka, therefore the park is exposed to annual drought, relieved by the south western monsoon. The elevation of the park is 91 metres (299 ft). Out of 23,498 hectares of total land area 14 percent, that is 3283 ha, is land under the reservoir. Another 50 ha are two smaller reservoirs. Nearby Thanamalvila area receives a 1,000 millimetres (39 in) of annual rainfall. Rainfall decreases from North to South and West to East across the national park. Mean annual temperature of Lunugamvehera is 30 °C (86 °F).

== Flora ==
The forest of Lunugamvehera national park characterized by several forest layers. Mosaic of scrubland and grassland make up these forests. Some of the plant species of the forest are Drypetes sepiaria, Manilkara hexandra, Schleichera oleosa, Lannea coromandelica, Diospyros ovalifolia, Polyalthia korinti, Carmona microphylla, Croton lacciterus, and Coffea wightiana. Grassland area contains several species of grasses. Chloris montana, Cynodon dactylon, Panicum maximum, Imperata cylindrica, Lantana camara, Chromolaena odorata, Mimosa pudica, Carmona microphylla, and Securinega leucopyrus are common in abandoned chena lands. Teak and eucalyptus plantations are now common in the forest.

== Fauna ==
Fauna of the park includes 21 fish species, 12 amphibians, 33 reptiles, 183 birds and 43 mammals. Sri Lankan elephant, water buffalo, Sri Lankan sambar deer, wild boar, Sri Lankan spotted chevrotain, grizzled giant squirrel, Sri Lankan axis deer, and Asian palm civet are some of the common mammals. Bufo atukoralei, and Fejervarya pulla are endemic among amphibians found in the forest. Mugger crocodile is one of the aquatic reptiles. Large water birds such as grey heron, black-headed ibis, Asian openbill, painted stork, and spot-billed pelican live here.

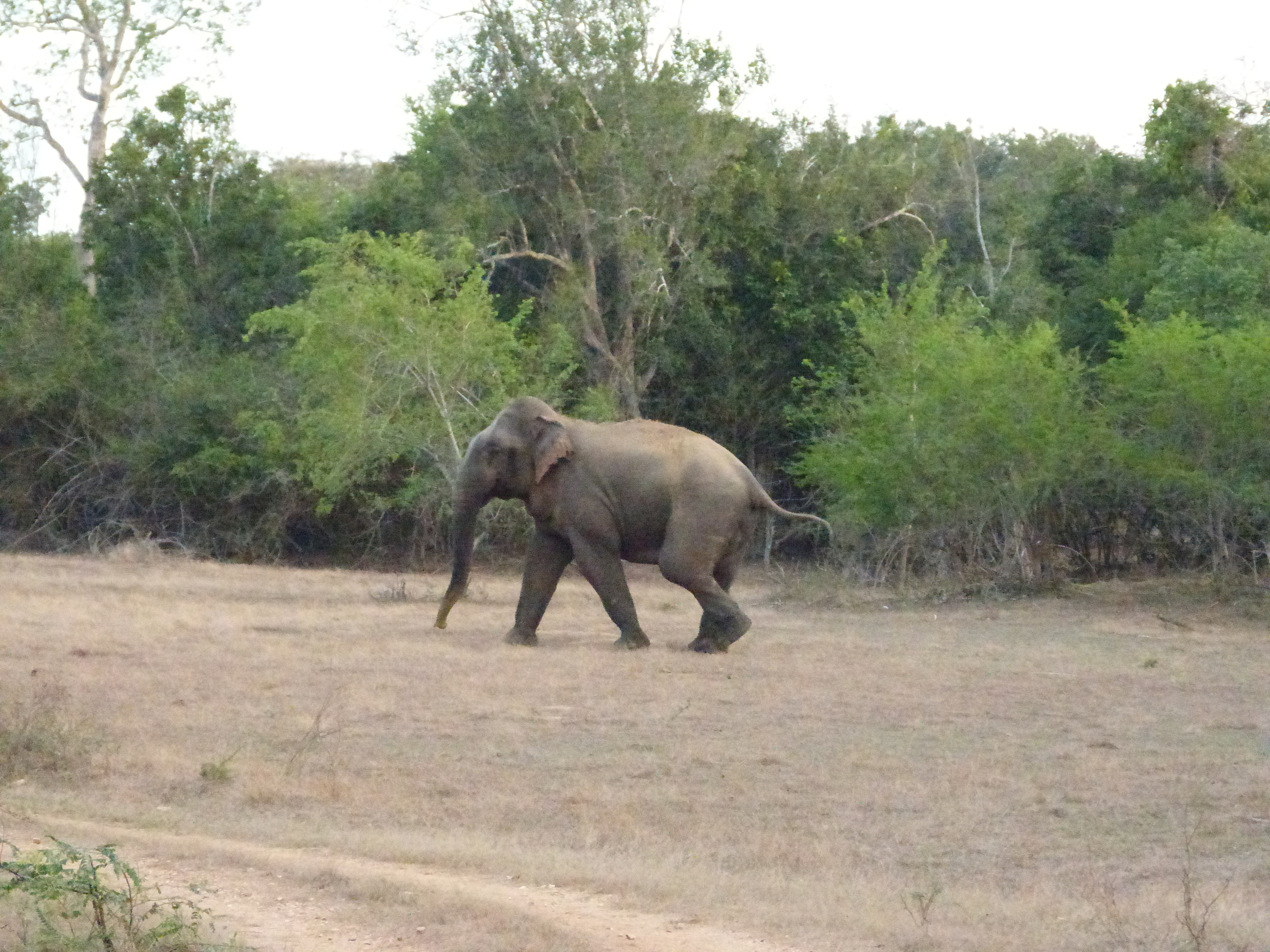
Elephant bull at Lunugamvehera

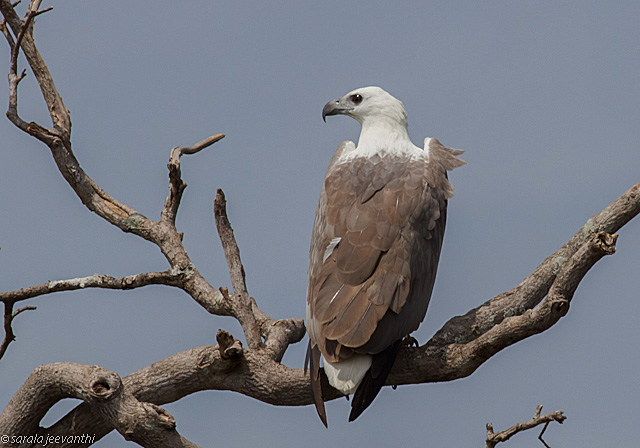
White bellied sea eagle

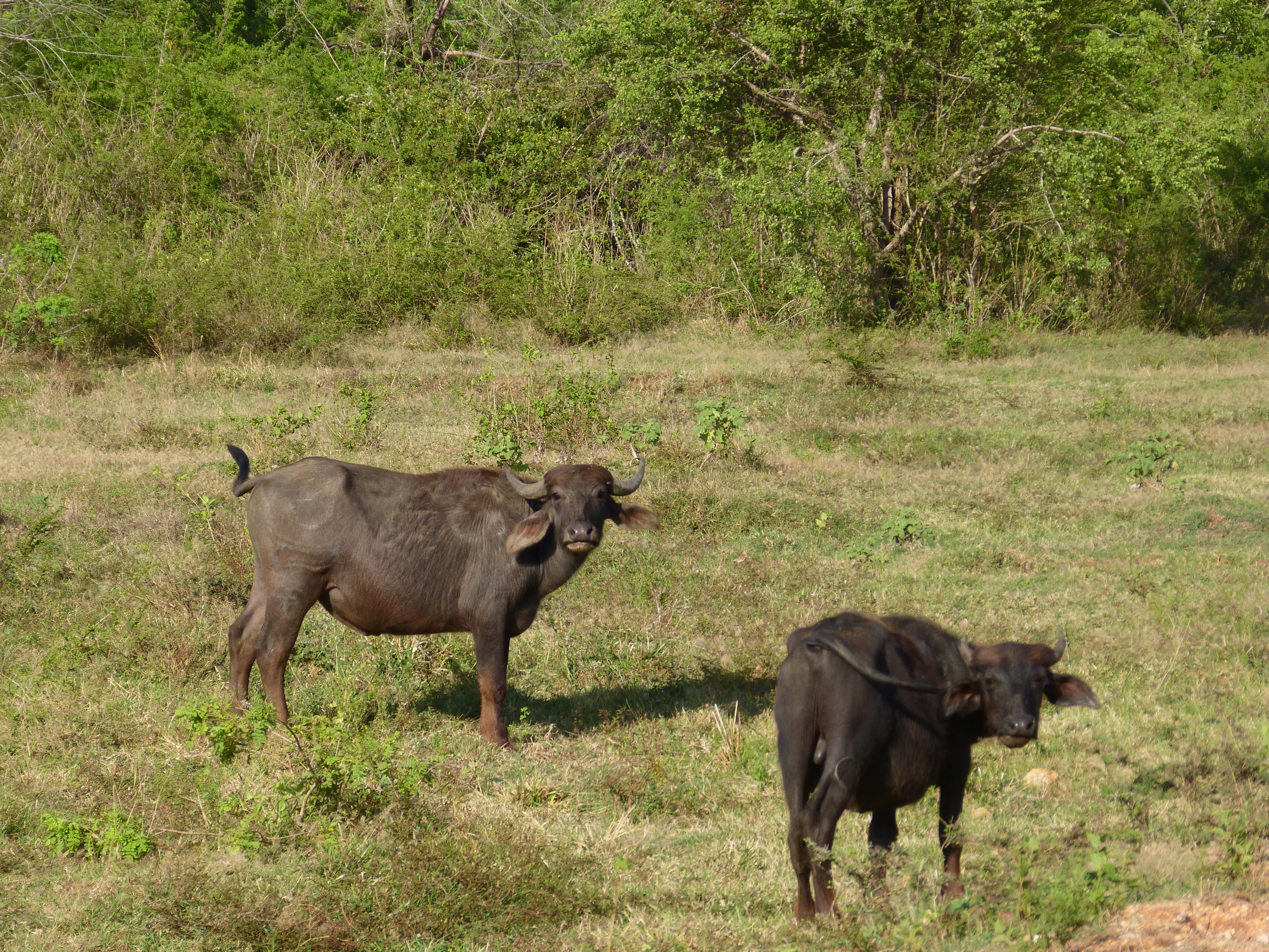
Domestic buffaloes grazing freely in the Park

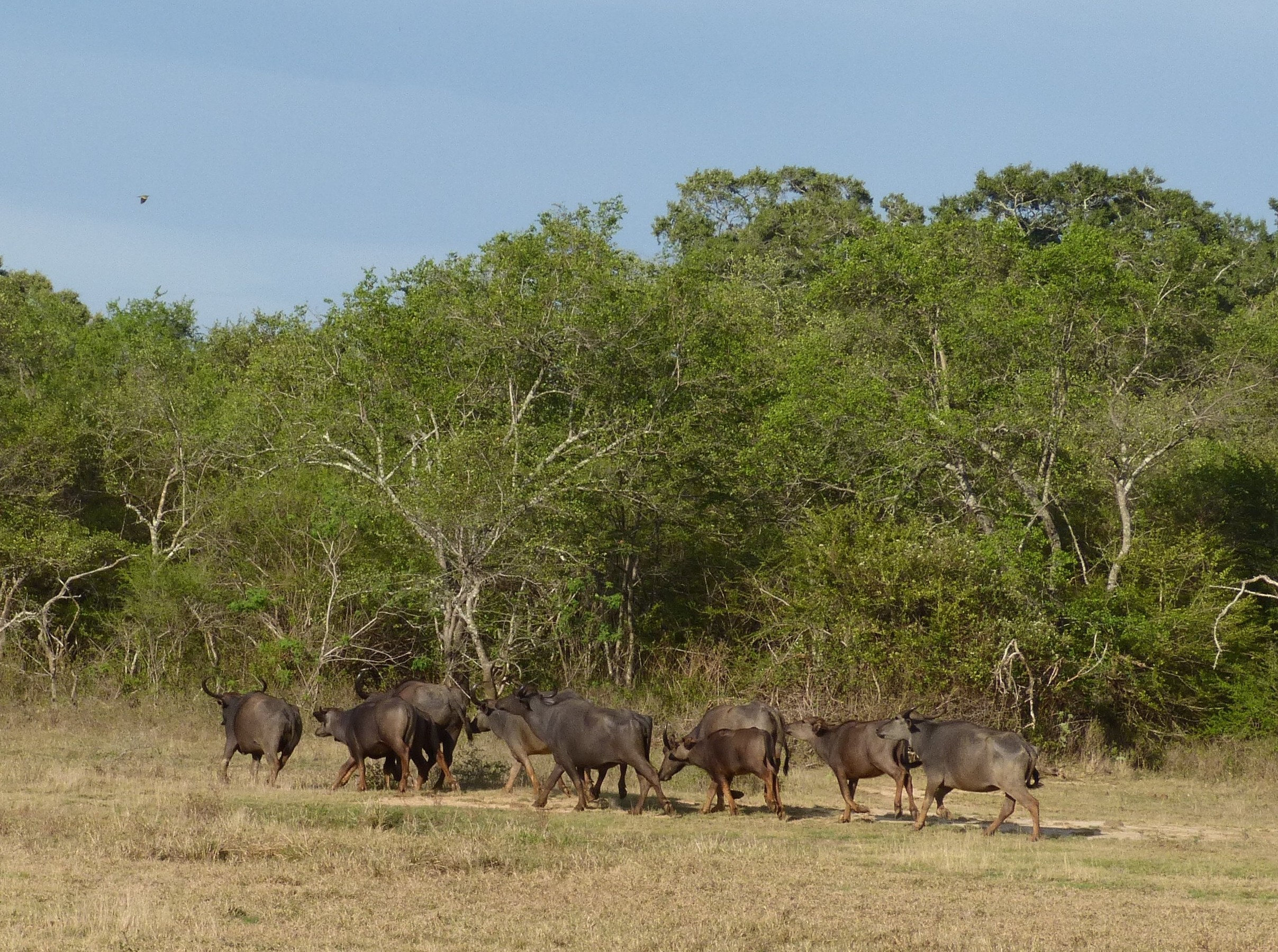
Herd of wild water buffaloes

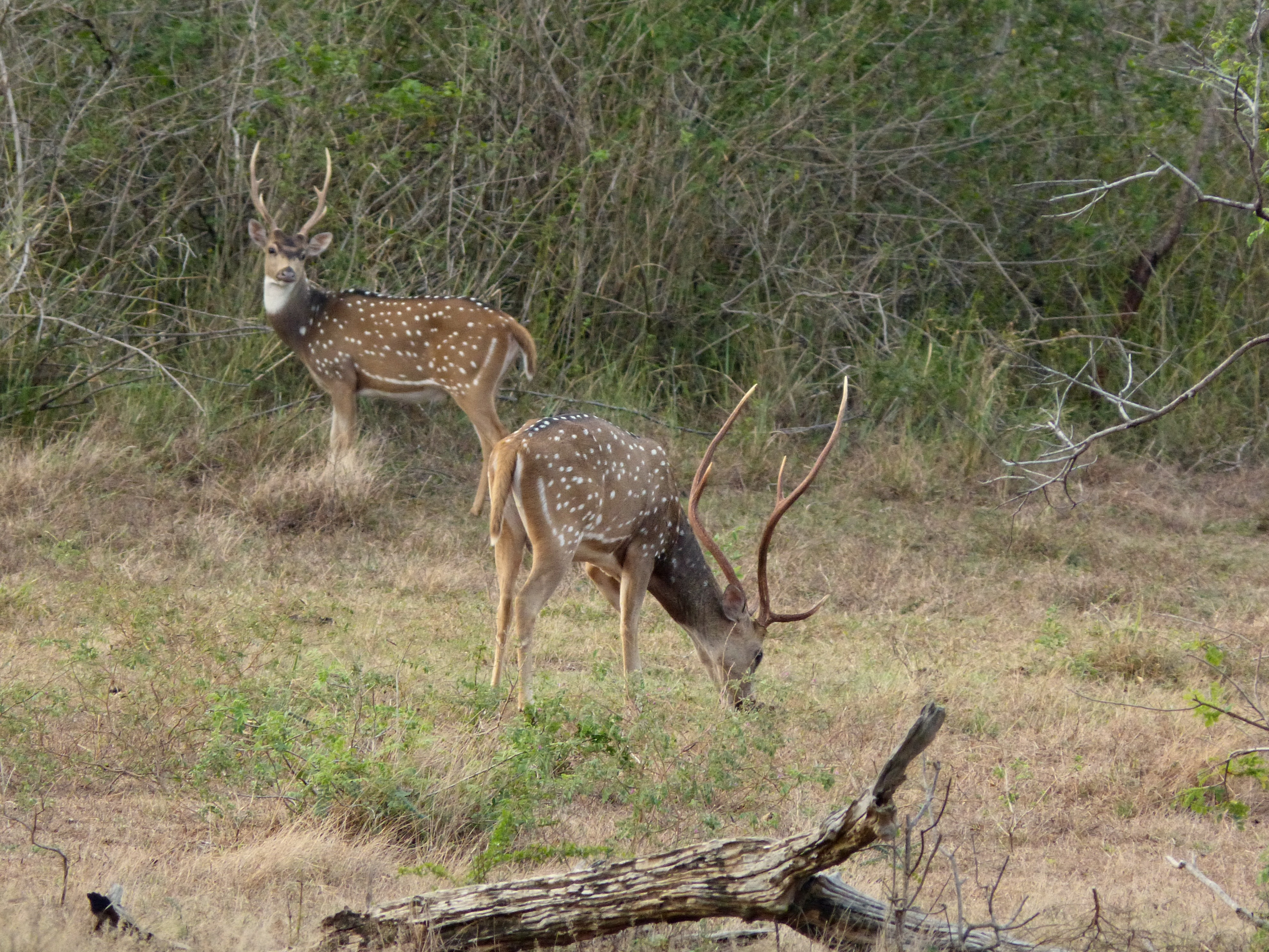
Spotted deer at Lunugamvehera

== Conservation ==
Lunugamvehera is one of the protected areas where tufted gray langur can be found in the wild. It has been reported that several translocated elephants have starved to death.

== See also ==
- Protected areas of Sri Lanka
