= Lahugala Kitulana National Park =

National park in Sri Lanka

- ලාහුගල-කිතුලාන ජාතික වනෝද්‍යානය
- IUCN category II (national park)
- Location within Sri Lanka
- Location: Eastern province, Sri Lanka
- Nearest city: Siyambalanduwa
- Coordinates: 6°53′N 81°40′E
- Area: 1,554 ha (3,840 acres)
- Established: October 31, 1980
- Governing body: Department of Wildlife Conservation

Lahugala Kitulana National Park (Sinhala: ලාහුගල-කිතුලාන ජාතික වනෝද්‍යානය) is one of the smallest national parks in Sri Lanka. Despite its land area, the park is an important habitat for Sri Lankan elephant and endemic birds of Sri Lanka. The national park contains the reservoirs of Lahugala, Kitulana and Sengamuwa and they are ultimately empties to Heda Oya river. Originally it was designated as a wildlife sanctuary on July 1 of 1966. Then the protected area was upgraded to a national park on October 31 of 1980. Lahugala Kitulana is situated 318 km east of Colombo.

== Physical features ==
Mean annual rainfall of the area is about 1,650 millimetres (65 in). North east monsoon persist during the months November to December. Two dry periods last from May to October and January to March. The terrain of the park is flat with occasional rocky outcrops.

== Cultural importance ==
Nearby Magul Maha Viharaya is supposed to have been built for the occasion of the marriage of King Kavan Tissa to princess Viharamahadevi. Later the Vihara believed to be offered to the Sangha community.

== Flora ==
The national park's vegetation is classified into Sri Lanka dry-zone dry evergreen forests. Dominant grass species Sacciolepis interrupta is a main food source for elephants. Common floral species of the park include Drypetes sepiaria, Manilkara hexandra, Berrya cordifolia, Vitex pinnata, Chloroxylon swietenia, and the golden shower tree.

== Fauna ==
This national park is traditionally used by elephants as a feeding ground. A herd of 150 individuals is attracted by Sacciolepis interrupta grass which is common around the Lahugala tank. Endemic toque macaque, tufted gray langur, sloth bear, golden jackal, rusty-spotted cat, fishing cat, Sri Lanka leopard, wild boar, Indian muntjac, Sri Lankan axis deer, Sri Lankan sambar deer, Indian pangolin and Indian hare are the other mammals found in the park.

Many wetland birds found in Lahugala Kitulana include great white pelican, purple heron, painted stork, lesser adjutant, Anas spp., white-bellied sea eagle, grey-headed fish eagle, common kingfisher, stork-billed kingfisher, white-throated kingfisher. Spot-billed pelican, Asian openbill and woolly-necked stork are also recorded visiting the wetland. The last recorded sighting of knob-billed duck, now thought be extinct in Sri Lanka, occurred in here. Red-faced malkoha and Sri Lanka spurfowl are two endemic birds that reside in the park.

Endemic Bufo atukoralei, Fejervarya limnocharis, Polypedates maculatus, Banded bull frog, and Microhyla rubra are among the amphibians of the national park. Python molurus, Rat snake, Chrysopelea spp. Boiga spp., Dryophis spp., and Russell's viper are among the notable reptiles. Melanochelys trijuga and Lissemys punctata are two freshwater turtles that inhabit in the tank of Lahugala. Endemic fish species Clarias brachysoma is also dwell in the tank.

== Conservation ==
The Sri Lanka Wildlife Conservation Society is initiated a project to establish an electric fence to protect four villages adjacent to the southern boundary of the park. Poaching, logging, fuelwood collection, grazing are the prominent threats to the park. Development of lower Uva basin is a potential threat to the park as it would increase the cultivated area in turn it would isolate park and its elephant herd. A jungle corridor is being proposed to link the park with Gal Oya and Kumana National Parks. Environmentalists protested against a proposed canal which would have run within the park. They pointed that it is unlawful to allow the construction not just within the park but beyond one kilometre from the park as well.

== Avifauna ==
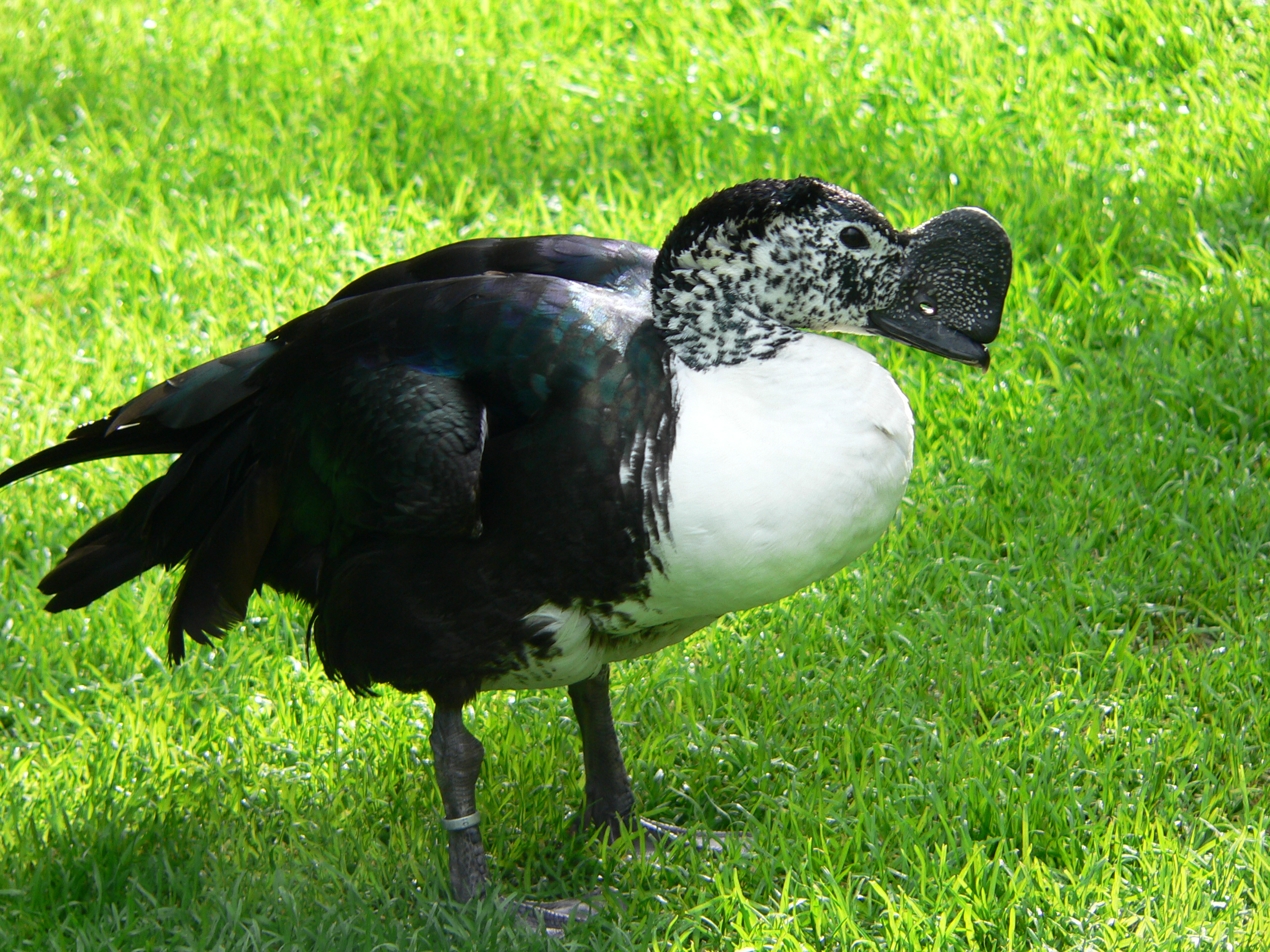
Knob-billed duck

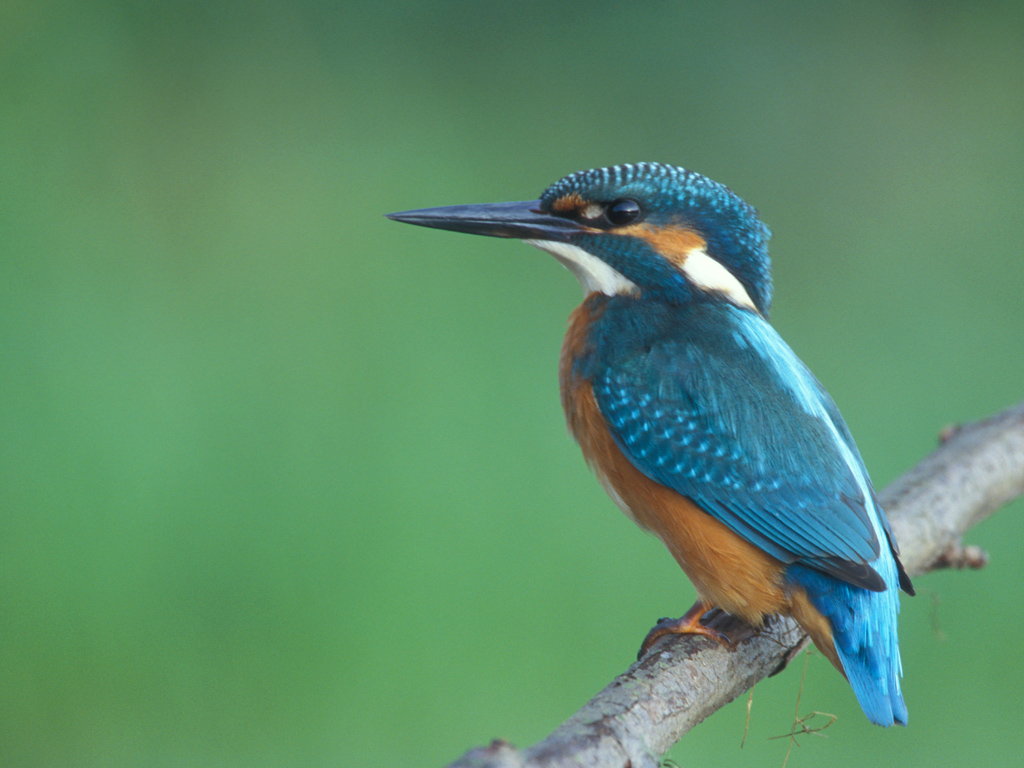
Common kingfisher

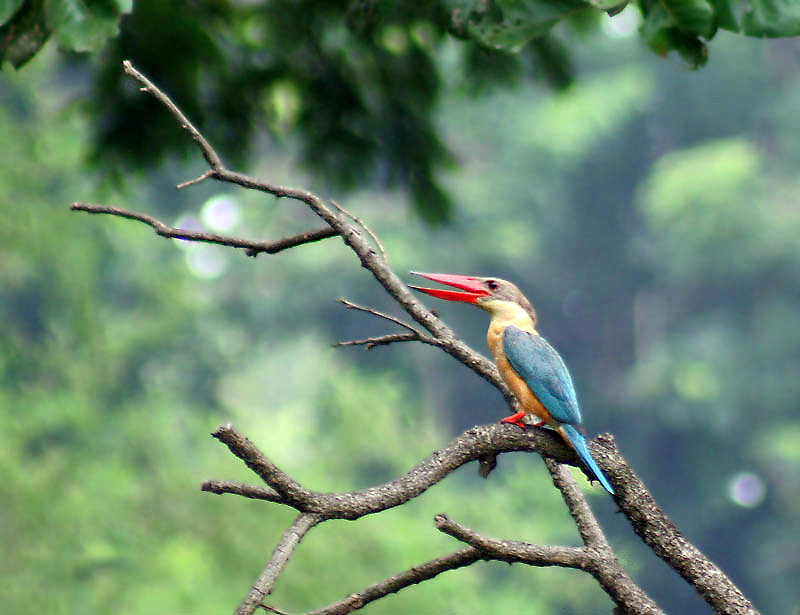
Stork-billed kingfisher

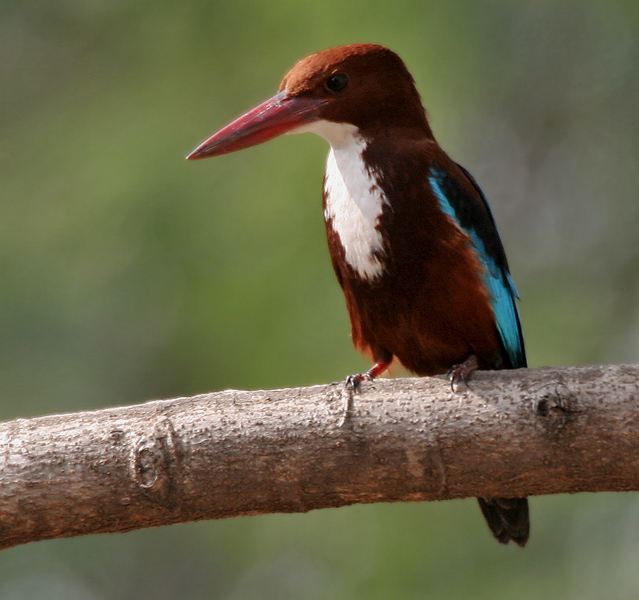
White-throated kingfisher

== See also ==
- Protected areas of Sri Lanka
