= Magul Maha Viharaya =

Buddhist temple in Sri Lanka

- මඟුල් මහා විහාරය
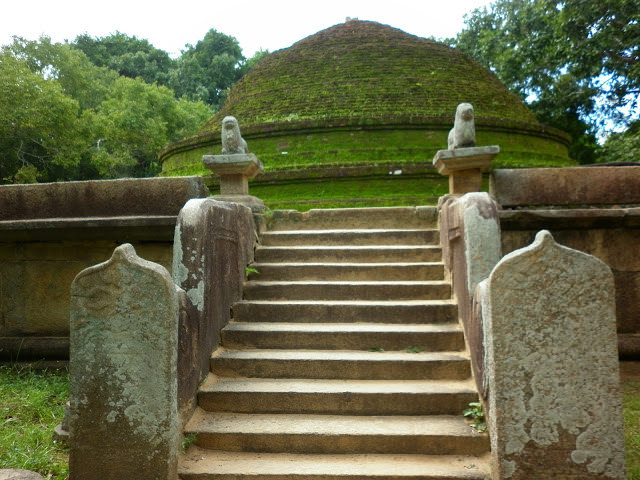
- Granite entrance to an ancient stupa at Magul Maha Viharaya

Religion
- Affiliation: Buddhism
- District: Ampara
- Province: Eastern province

Location
- Location: Lahugala, Sri Lanka
- Interactive map of Magul Maha Viharaya
- Coordinates: 06°52′03″N 81°44′12″E

Architecture
- Type: Buddhist Temple
- Founder: King Kavan Tissa (205-161 BC) or King Dhatusena (463-479 AD)
- Completed: 2nd century BC
- Archaeological Protected Monument of Sri Lanka
- Designated: 26 March 1954

Magul Maha Viharaya is an ancient Buddhist temple situated in Lahugala, Ampara District of Sri Lanka. The temple lies on the northern edge of the Lahugala National Park, about 22 km off from Siyambalanduwa town and about 11 km off Pottuvil town. Lahugala has been part of the Kingdom of Ruhuna in ancient Sri Lanka. The ruins of Magul Maha Vihara are one of the major tourist attractions of the Eastern province. This temple is also an archaeologically protected monument of the country.

== History and legends ==
The history of Magul Maha Vihara possibly dates back to the period of King Kavantissa (205-161 BC) who ruled the Kingdom of Ruhuna in ancient Sri Lanka. There is evidence that suggests that the king built this temple in the 2nd Century BC at the exact location where he married the princess Viharamahadevi, the daughter of king Kelani Tissa. Other sources claim that King Dhatusena (463-479 AD) built this temple while many other monarchs renovated it centuries later. There is a stone inscription at the site of this temple, commissioned by a regional ruler named Parakramabahu that dates back to the 14th century which supports the latter view.

According to legend Viharamaha Devi, the daughter of King Kelanitissa volunteered to sacrifice herself to the sea to appease the gods who were enraged at the King for punishing an innocent monk. The princess was safely carried over the ocean waves, reaching ashore at a place near the Muhudu Maha Viharaya in Pottuvil, where the encounter between king Kavantissa and the princess took place which later led to their marriage. The legend also tells that the marriage ceremony was conducted at the premises of Magul Maha Viharaya in Lahugala, where the King had later built the temple to celebrate the auspicious event. The foundations of the Magul Maduwa where the wedding ceremony occurred can still be seen at the temple premises. Magul is a word in native Sinhala language which gives the meaning wedding or auspicious.

Magul Maha Vihara had been renovated by several monarchs after its establishment. A 14th century stone inscription, located within the temple premises, reveals a queen who also had the name Viharamaha Devi, wife of King Buvenekabahu IV of Gampola and Parakramabahu V of Gampola, who renovated and donated many acres of land to this temple. Magul Maha Viharaya is inscribed in this stone inscription as Ruhunu Maha Viharaya. Some other sources reveal that king Dappula I (661-664 AD), constructed this temple after listening to the preachings of Buddhist monks. It is speculated that around 12,000 monks inhabited the complex at some stage in history, which is evident in the largeness of the ancient temple.

== Ruins and surroundings ==
Presently a significant amount of ruins of the ancient temple can be seen at the location. The image shrine, the Bodhi Tree (sacred fig) and the stupa are all in a good state of preservation. The main gate, a solidly built wall that surrounds all the buildings and the remains of a small shrine with an unusual moonstone at its entrance are some of the structures that can be seen at the site today. The elephants on this moonstone all have riders on their backs, something unseen in all other Sri Lankan moonstones. The stupa of Lahugala Magul Maha Vihara is built on a high terrace with three staircases leading up to it. There are images of grand lion guardians at the top of these stairs.

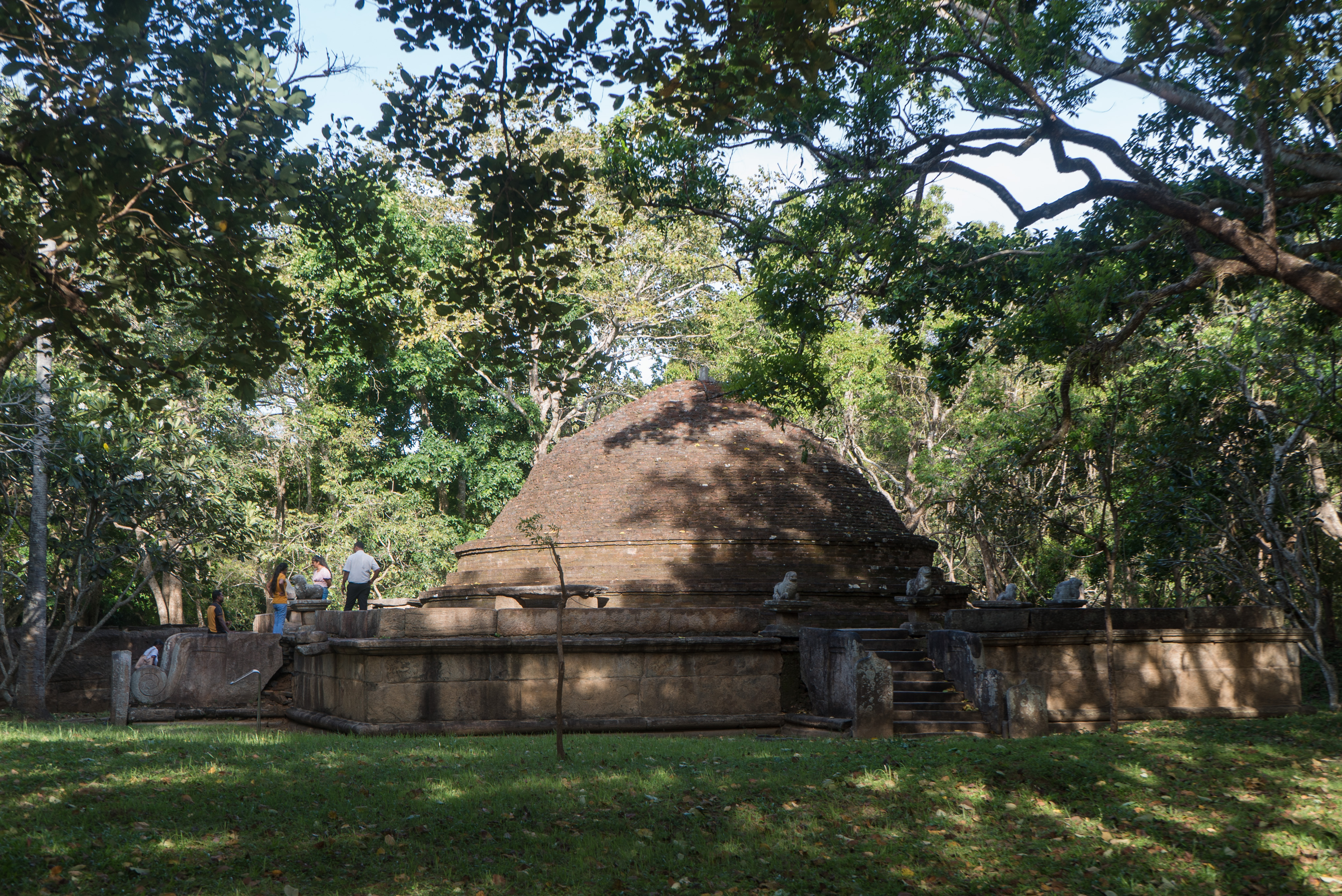
Magul Viharaya and other ruins are surrounded by the forests

The causeway which is used to approach Magul Maha Vihara is situated across a small reservoir which surrounds the entire temple complex. The entire temple complex had covered an extent of around 10,000 acres where ruins of a palace, moonstone, monastery, bo-maluwa, stupas, ponds etc. are found scattered all over. These and all the other ruins at Lahugala are all surrounded by the forests of the Lahugala National Park, which is an important habitat for animals such as elephants, sambars, deer, leopards and many endemic birds of Sri Lanka.

== Vihara inscriptions ==
=== Magul Maha Vihara slab inscription 1 ===
Period: 9th-10th century AD, Script: Medieval Sinhala, Language: Medieval Sinhala
Content: "Sati Abboy donated this stone slab. From the merit that accrues he wishes Sihila and himself to attain Buddhahood"

=== Magul Maha Vihara slab inscription 2 ===
Period: 14th century AD, Script: Medieval Sinhala, Language: Medieval Sinhala
Transcript: "(1) Svasti Siri-Lak-hi raja (2) ka[la] Dasen-kali raja-da- (3) -ruvan-da karavu me Ru- (4) -nu- maha-vera maha-val (5) va tubuva daka Soli-se- (6) -nava mada Runu-rata raja ka- (7) -rana Parakumba de-ba-raja-daru- (8) -van de-denata aga-mehe- (9) -sun vu Vihara-maha-devi na- (10) -m ma visin mul pisa ka- (11) -rava daru-gam vatana-pasa pariva- (12) -ra sihita va .. .. bada- (13) -vas kota ma [visin] karavanala- (14) -da me siyalu pin-kam matu va- (15) -na raja yuva-raja .. .. (16) adinut anu .. .. (17) pavatviya yutu bavi- (18) -n ma namin kala (Vihara) -de- (19) -vi-pirivena me vera ba- (20) -da bava data yutu"
Content: "Viharamahadevi, the chief consort of the two brother kings named Parakramabahu, who vanquished the Colas and governed the Ruhuna, restored the Ruhunu maha vihara (Magul Maha Vihara) founded by king Dhathusena and supplied the requisites for the sangha and attendants. Attached to this monastery she built the Viharadevi Pirivena. It is stipulated that future kings should continue to maintain these institutions"

=== Magul Maha Vihara pillar inscription ===
Period: 14th century AD, Script: Medieval Sinhala, Language: Medieval Sinhala
Content: "Viharamahadevi, the chief consort of the two brother kings named Parakramabahu, renovated the Ruhunu maha vihara (Magul Maha Vihara). It also mentions that this dedication to the Dharmaratna should be maintained by future kings too"

== See also ==
- Muhudu Maha Viharaya
