= Pottuvil massacre =

Killing of ten Muslim labourers in Sri Lanka

- Pottuvil (Sri Lanka)
- Location: Pottuvil, Eastern Province, Sri Lanka
- Date: 17 September 2006
- Target: Muslim civilians
- Attack type: massacre
- Deaths: 10
- Injuries: 1
- Perpetrator: Special Task Force

The Pottuvil Massacre was the killing of 10 Muslim labourers who had gone to repair the bund of Rattal Tank in Pottuvil in the southern part of the Ampara District on 17 September 2006. The victims were all men aged between 18–35 whose bodies were found hacked to death the next morning. The massacre was widely believed to have been carried out by the Special Task Force (STF).

Although the Sri Lankan government blamed the Liberation Tigers of Tamil Eelam (LTTE), members of the Muslim community accused the STF of involvement in the massacre. The local Muslim population staged protests demanding the removal of the STF officers. One of them stated:

"Special Task Force troops killed these people. We don’t blame anyone else. The LTTE can’t come into this area. It is completely controlled by the STF. Without the STF’s knowledge, no one can come into this area."

They also questioned how the LTTE could infiltrate into an area carrying swords, kill 10 people and then leave without the STF spotting them; with no encounter between the LTTE and the STF taking place. Rauff Hakeem, the leader of the SLMC, requested an international commission to probe the incident.

Amid these accusations, the government had acted irregularly. The ambulance transporting the only survivor was prevented by police from going to the hospital at a predominantly Muslim town called Kalmunai. The ambulance was redirected to a hospital at Sinhalese-dominated Ampara. The survivor was held incommunicado by armed guards at the Amparai Hospital and the SLMM were prevented from seeing him. Eyewitness also reported that the police destroyed crime scene evidence.

The sole survivor of the attack, Meera Mohideen (60), identified the LTTE as the attackers in a videotaped testimony given from the hospital to Minister A. L. M. Athaullah. However, doubts were raised about how the interview was conducted as the survivor was held incommunicado; and Athaullah was suspected to have been behind the fabricated statements that Defence Ministry claimed it had received from several community organizations in the eastern province blaming the LTTE for the massacre. Mohideen was also said to have been unable to later recall giving the interview, suggesting that he had been put through a "propaganda exercise" while in an unstable state.

The human rights group UTHR(J) blamed the STF for the massacre. Muslims in the area had a troubled history with the Sasthiriveli STF camp; they accused its Chief Inspector S.N. Gunaratne of aiding the local Sinhalese community in land disputes and of threatening them the day before the massacre for seeking his transfer. Muslim eyewitness testimonies also indicate the involvement of the STF and Sinhalese elements in the abduction of the labourers.

The majority of Pottuvil residents remain convinced that the state is engaged in a cover-up. The Sri Lankan state forces themselves have a history of intimidating witnesses and forcing false statements.

No independent or international commission to probe this incident has been carried out till date.
