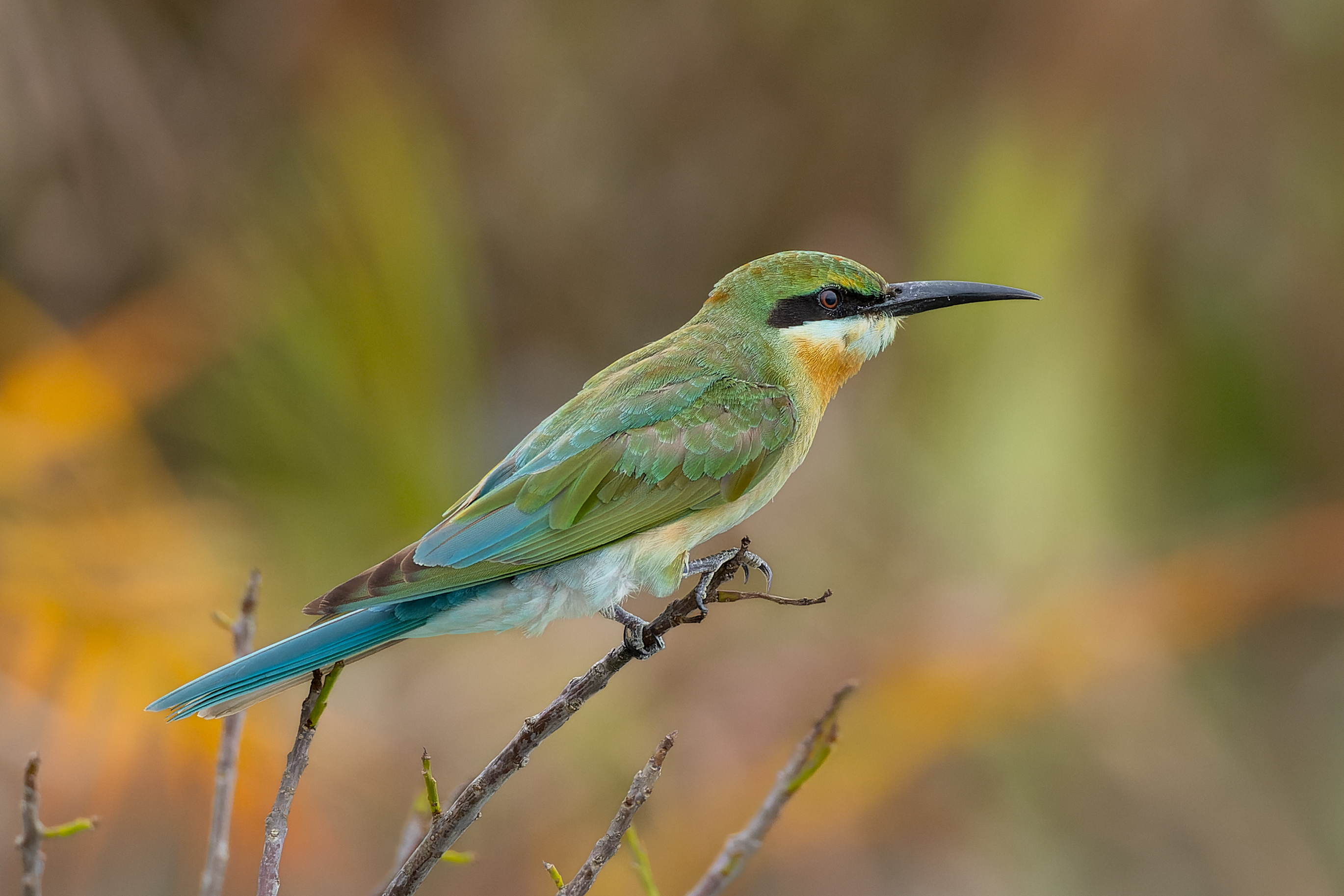
- (Merops philippinus) in Sundarbans National Park, West Bengal, India

Conservation status
- Least Concern (IUCN 3.1)

Scientific classification
- Kingdom: Animalia
- Phylum: Chordata
- Class: Aves
- Order: Coraciiformes
- Family: Meropidae
- Genus: Merops
- Species: M. philippinus

Binomial name
- Merops philippinus Linnaeus, 1767

Synonyms
- M. javanicus Horsfield, 1821

= Blue-tailed bee-eater =

Species of bird

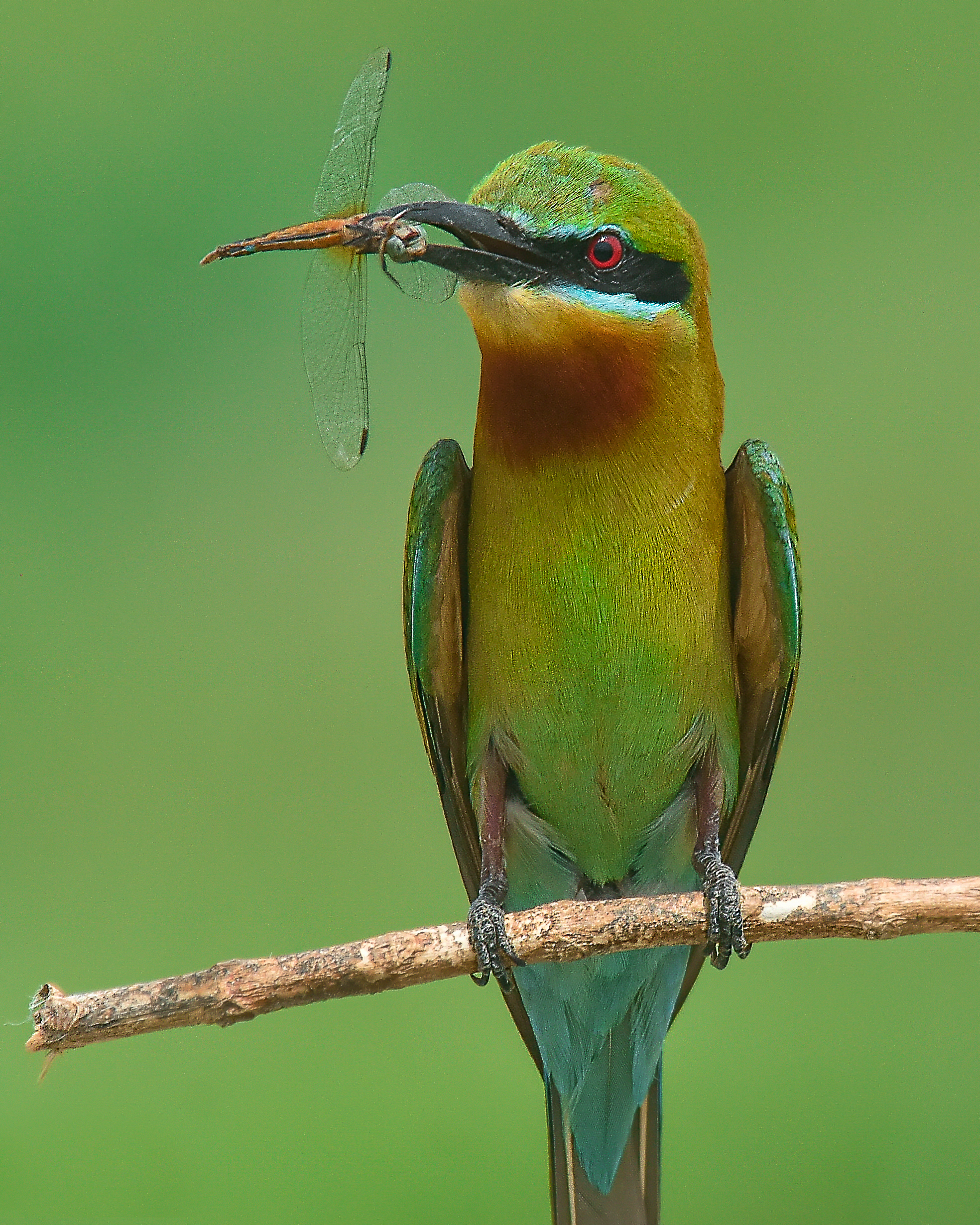
Blue-tailed Bee eater, Dhaka, Bangladesh

The blue-tailed bee-eater (Merops philippinus) is a bee-eater species mostly seen in open habitats close to water. It is widely distributed across South and Southeast Asia where many populations are strongly migratory, and seen seasonally in many parts but breeding colonially in small areas across their range, mostly in river valleys, where they nest by tunneling into loamy sand banks.

== Description ==
This species, like other bee-eaters, is a richly coloured, slender bird. It is predominantly green; its face has a narrow blue patch with a black eye stripe, and a yellow and brown throat; the tail is blue and the beak is black. The three outer toes are united around their bases. It is around 29 cm long excluding the elongated central tail feathers, which are an additional 7 cm long, and a weight of around 29–43 grams. Sexes are alike. The juveniles are drabber, and lack the elongated central tail feathers. This species is usually found near water and like other bee-eaters it predominantly eats flying insects, especially bees (as large as the Xylocopa sp.), wasps and hornets, which are caught in the air by sorties from an open perch. They may also forage in flight over estuaries, backwaters and even over the sea but not far from the coast. This species probably takes bees and dragonflies in roughly equal numbers. The insects that are caught are beaten on the perch to kill them and break the exoskeleton. This habit is seen in many other members of the order Coraciiformes. They call mainly in flight with a rolling chirping whistling teerp.

The only confusable species within its range is the blue-cheeked bee-eater which however tends to be found in drier areas. The blue-tailed differs in having the rump and tail blue rather than green and black. The undertail feathers are bluish rather than green in the blue-cheeked. The blue cheek patch is much smaller while the chestnut on the throat and breast darker and covering a larger area.

They breed in April to May in India nesting colonially with closely placed nest holes in a vertical mudbank or even burrowing into gently sloping land. They tend to choose sandy and sandy clay loams but avoid heavier clay loams. They also prefer clear mud banks without any vegetation cover. In Sri Lanka, they have been noted to breed in artificial sand dunes created by dredging of sea sand. The nest tunnel can run nearly 2 metres deep. About 5 to 7 near spherical eggs are laid. Both the male and the female take care of the eggs. The parents guard the nest to prevent intraspecific brood parasitism and extra pair copulation. These birds also feed and roost communally. One or two helpers may join the breeding pair after incubation begins. Although males and females appear similar to the human eye, males tend to have longer central tail feather extensions and UV reflectance studies demonstrate that healthy males had darker chestnut throats and brighter green body plumage while females showed brighter blue rumps and yellow chins.

== Taxonomy and systematics ==
This species has sometimes been considered to be conspecific with the blue-cheeked bee-eater which is a close sister taxon, the two forming a clade with the Madagascan olive bee-eater. In the past the species has been treated variously as M. persicus javanicus, M. superciliosus javanicus, and M. superciliosus philippinus.

== Ecological interactions ==
Based on the presence of spores of Nosema ceranae in the droppings of blue-tailed bee-eaters, it has been suggested that they may be capable of distributing the parasite to bees across a wide geographic range. A species of feather louse, Brueelia superciliosa has been described from hosts of this species in Thailand.

== Distribution and movements ==
The species has a patchy breeding distribution across India, Myanmar, and parts of Southeast Asia. In India they are known to breed in several of the river valleys including those of the Godavari, Kaveri, Tunga Badra and Krishna rivers. They also nest in the eastern parts of Sri Lanka.

Blue-tailed bee-eaters are seasonal in many parts of their range and are known to migrate diurnally en masse at some places like Tanjung Tuan (W. Malaysia) and Promsri Hill (southern Thailand). They are winter visitors in parts of Malaysia and peninsular India. The non-breeding ranges of the blue-cheeked bee-eater and blue-tailed overlap in some parts of Gujarat and western peninsular India.

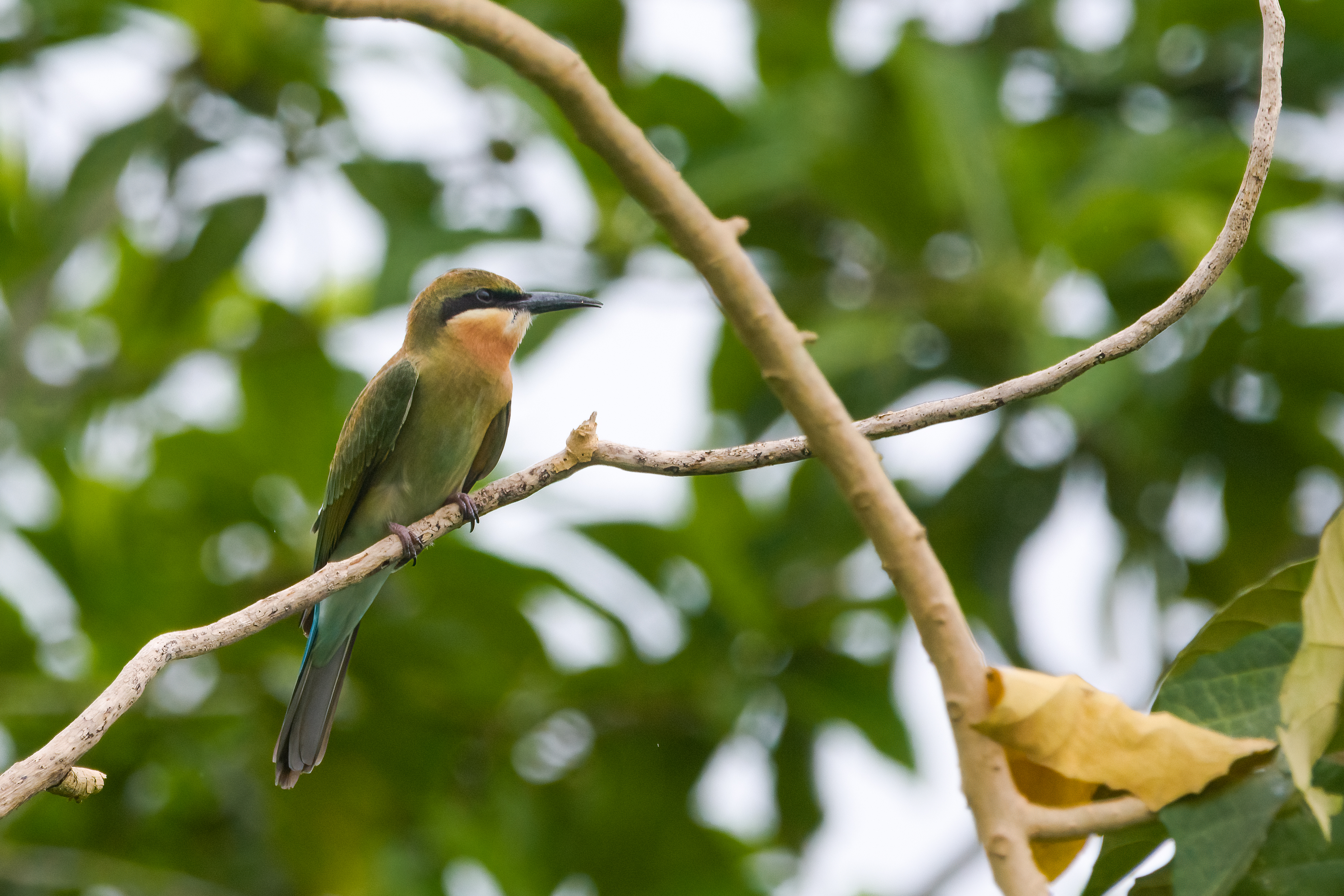
Merops philippinus (Blue-tailed Bee-eater) photographed in Cavite, Philippines

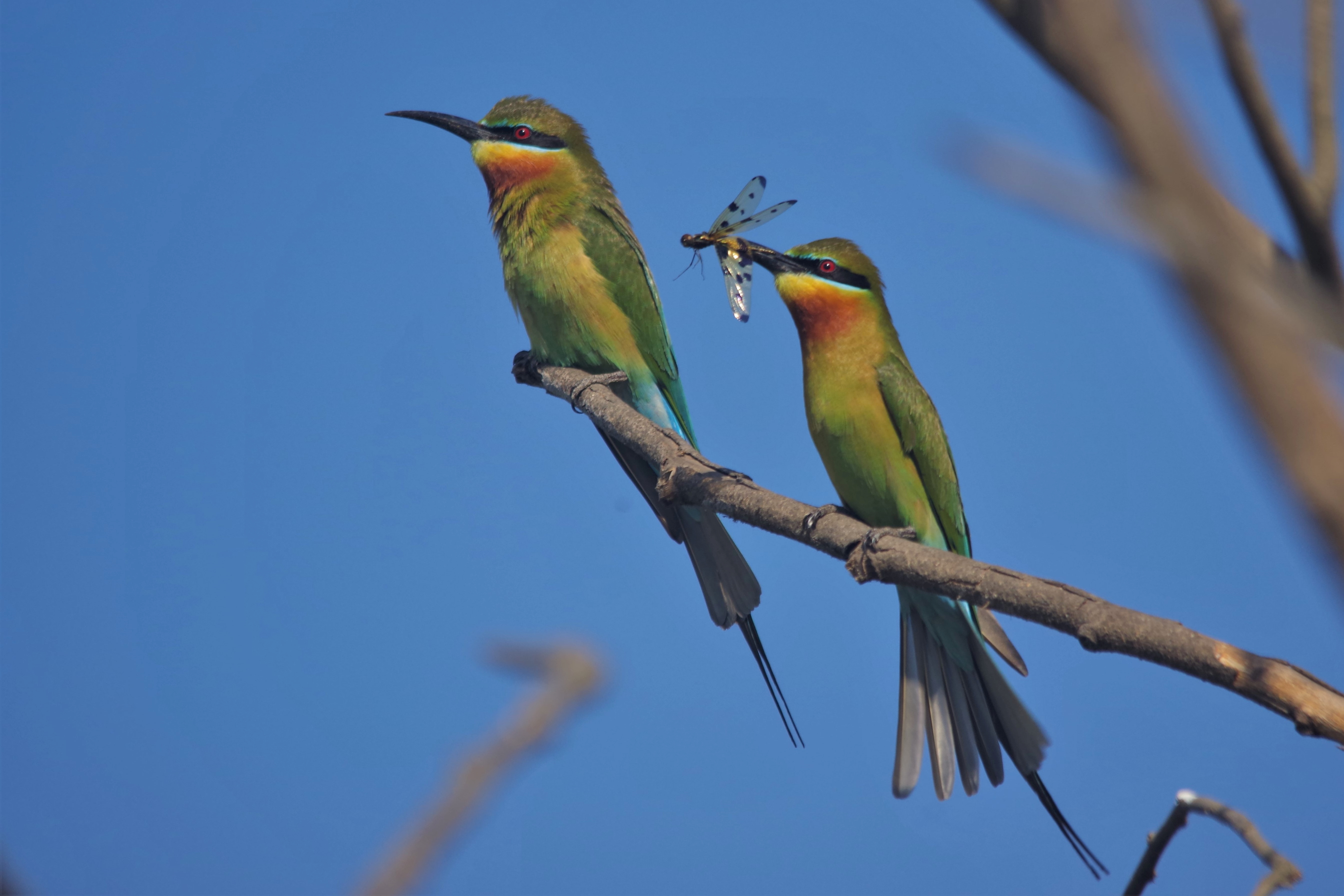
At the Powai Lake, India

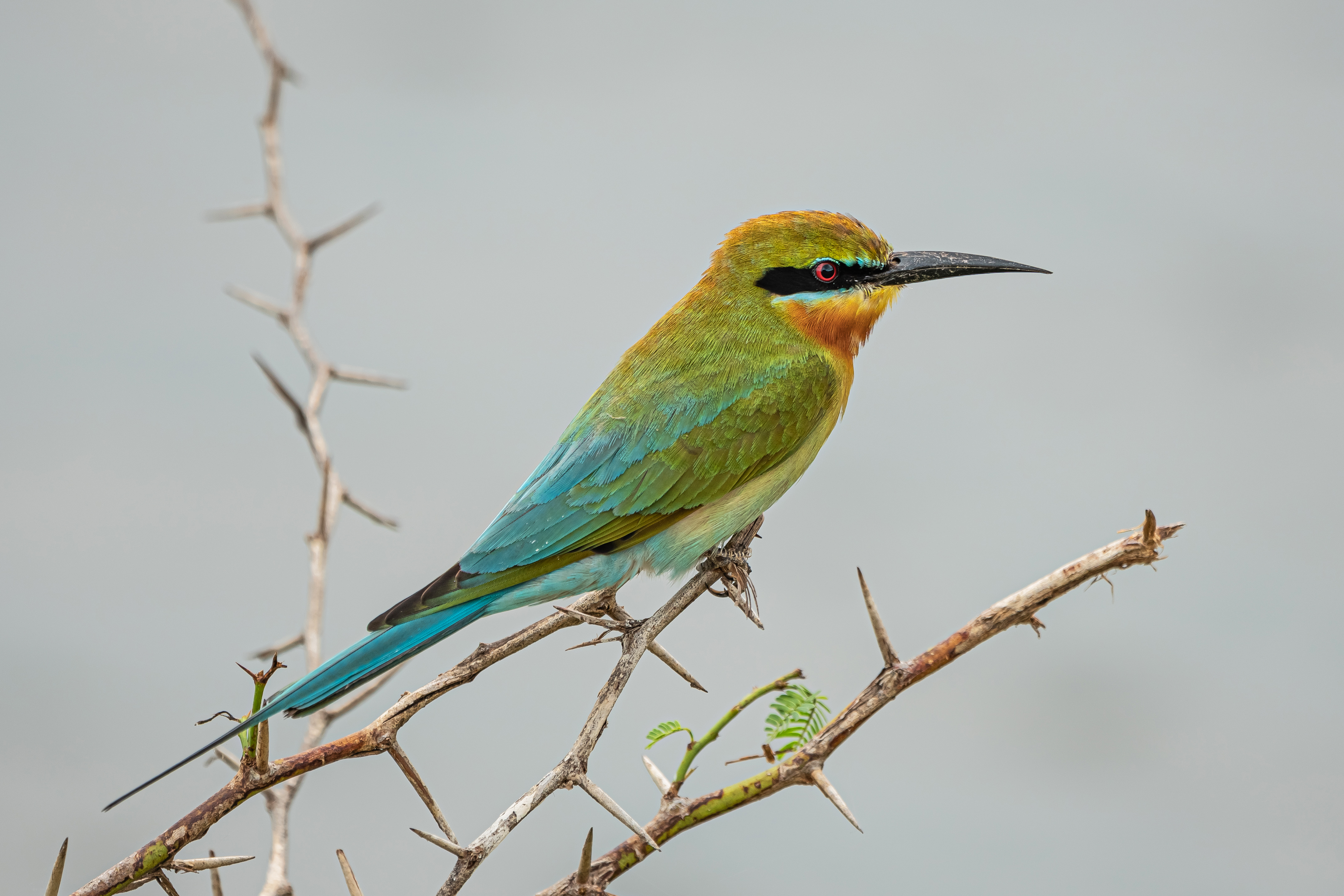
In the Bundala National Park, Sri Lanka

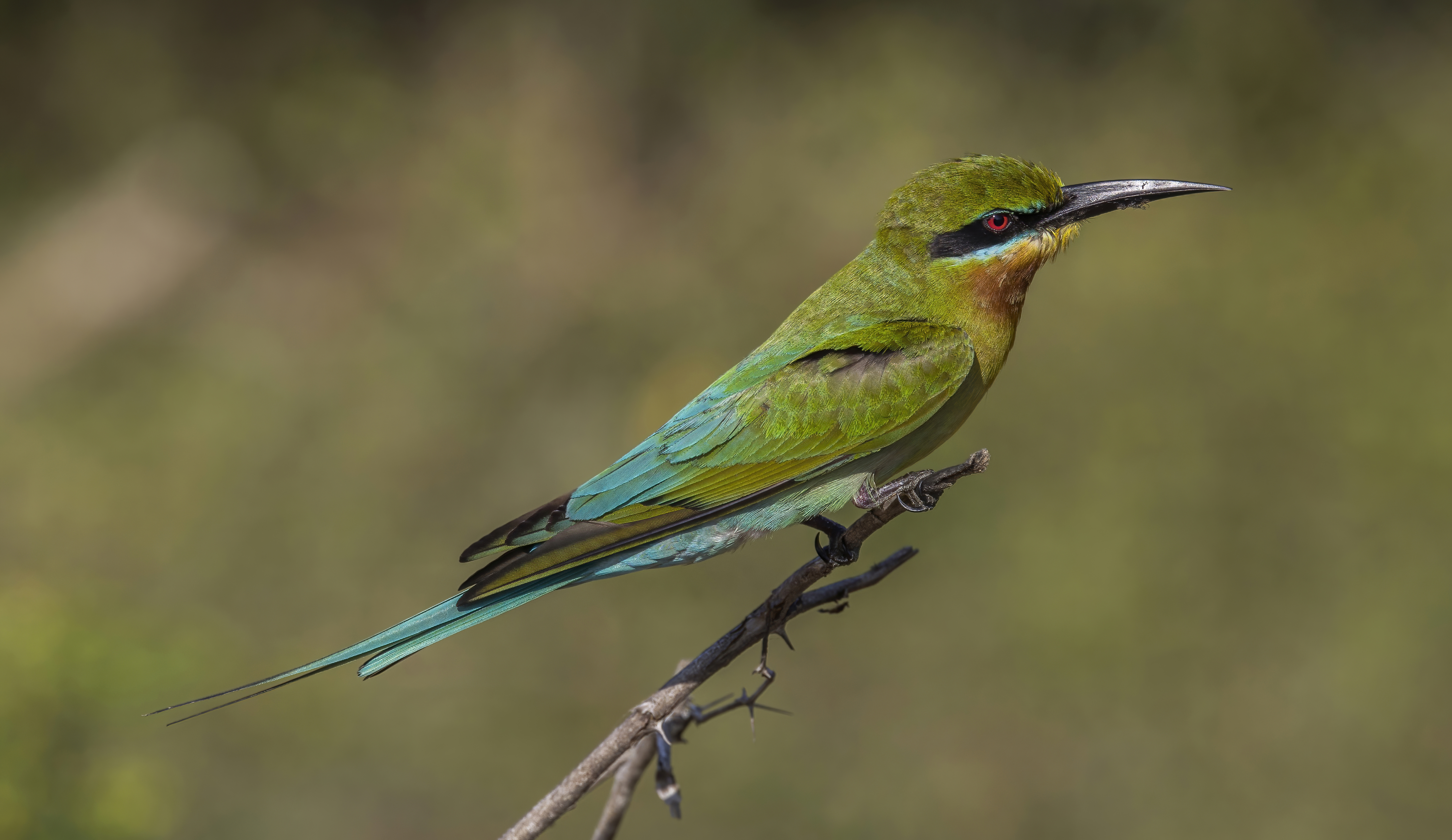
In the Yala National Park, Sri Lanka

Blue-tailed bee-eater range migration

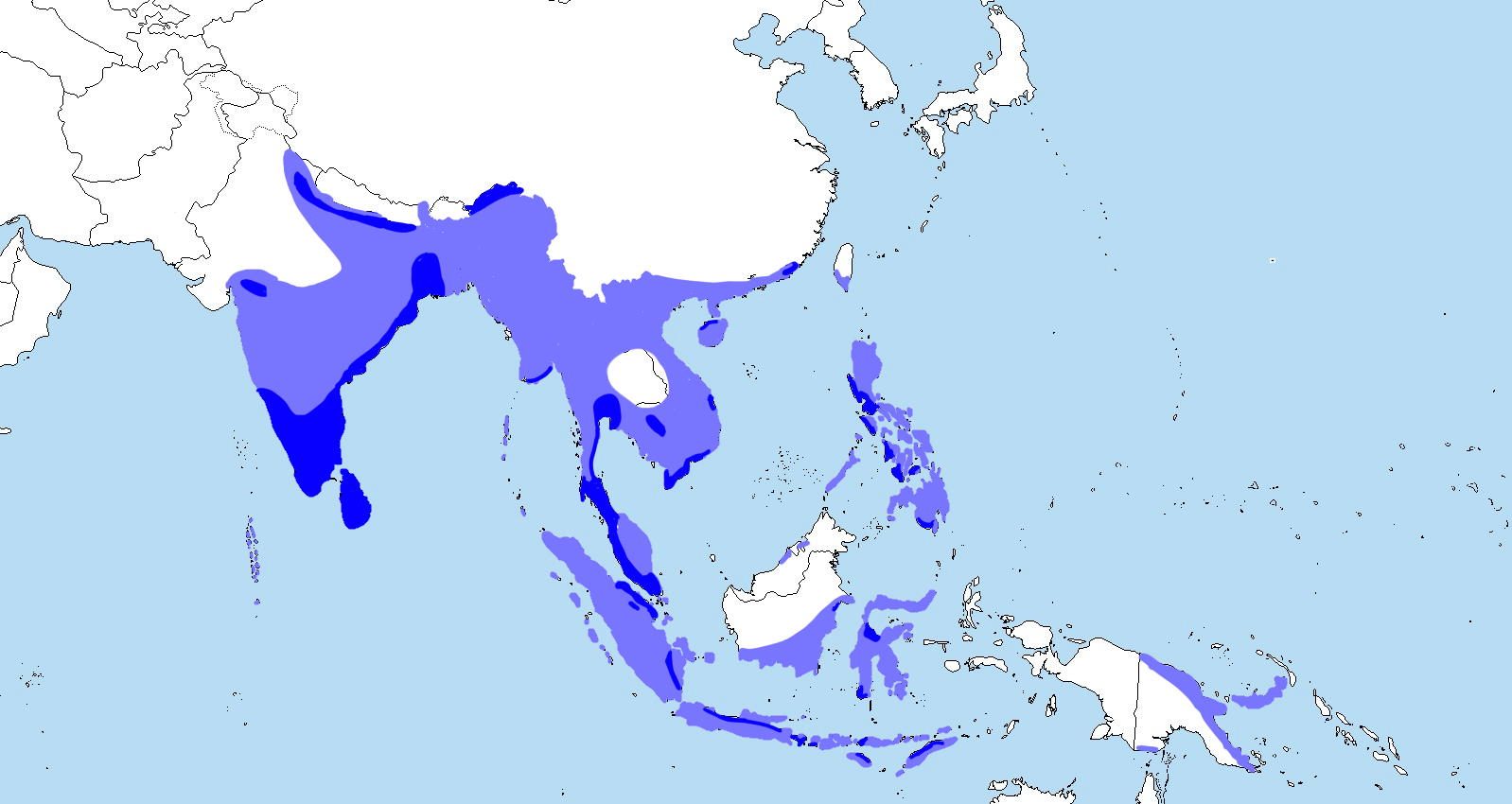
Habitat Map

== Status ==
The Blue-tailed bee-eater is listed as a species of least concern by the International Union for Conservation of Nature.
