= Muhudu Maha Vihara =

Buddhist temple in Sri Lanka

Muhudu maha vihara
- මුහුදු මහා විහාරය
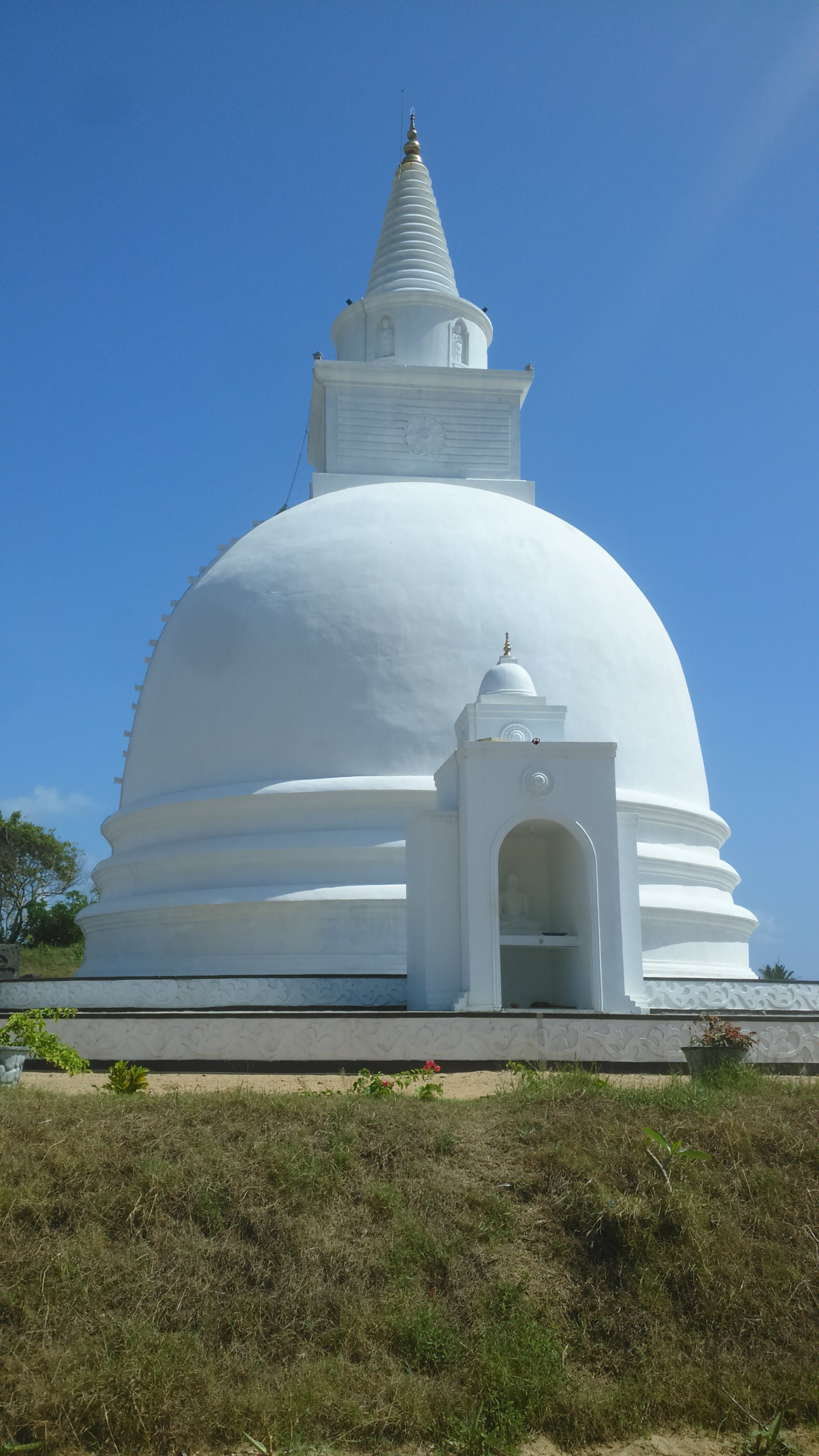
- The Stupa at Vihara

Religion
- Affiliation: Buddhism
- District: Ampara
- Province: Eastern province

Location
- Location: Pottuvil, Sri Lanka
- Interactive map of Muhudu maha vihara
- Coordinates: 06°52′39″N 81°50′20″E

Architecture
- Type: Buddhist Temple
- Founder: King Kavan Tissa
- Archaeological Protected Monument of Sri Lanka
- Designated

Muhudu Maha Vihara (Sinhalaː මුහුදු මහා විහාරය) is a Buddhist temple at Pottuvil in Ampara District, Eastern province of Sri Lanka. This temple, near a wide beach, is believed to have been built over 2000 years ago by King Kavan Tissa of Ruhuna. The ruins and remains of ancient stupas, Seema Malaka, Avasa Geya and statues can be seen at the site. Important ruins at the temple premises include stone statues of Buddha and two statues of old kings or gods.

== History ==
This Viharaya marks one of the suspected landing places of Viharamahadevi, daughter of Kelani Tissa, who was destined to become the queen of King Kavan Tissa of the Rohana Kingdom, along with Kirinda. Scholars argue that there is more evidence that Muhudu Maha Viharaya was in fact the landing site of Viharamahadevi due to the Kirinda Coast having a steep cliff, and hence it might've been unlikely that the princess landed there. According to the ancient chronicle Rajavaliya, it is stated that in the second century BC after Kelaniya was submerged by the sea due to a natural disaster, Devi the daughter of King of Kelaniya was cast to sea in a Golden Vessel to appease the gods, and washed ashore near the Muhudu Maha Vihara in Pottuwil. Later she became the main consort of King Kavan Tissa of Ruhuna Kingdom, under the name Viharamahadevi.

== See also ==
- Magul Maha Viharaya
