= Bundala National Park =

National park in Sri Lanka

- IUCN category II (national park)
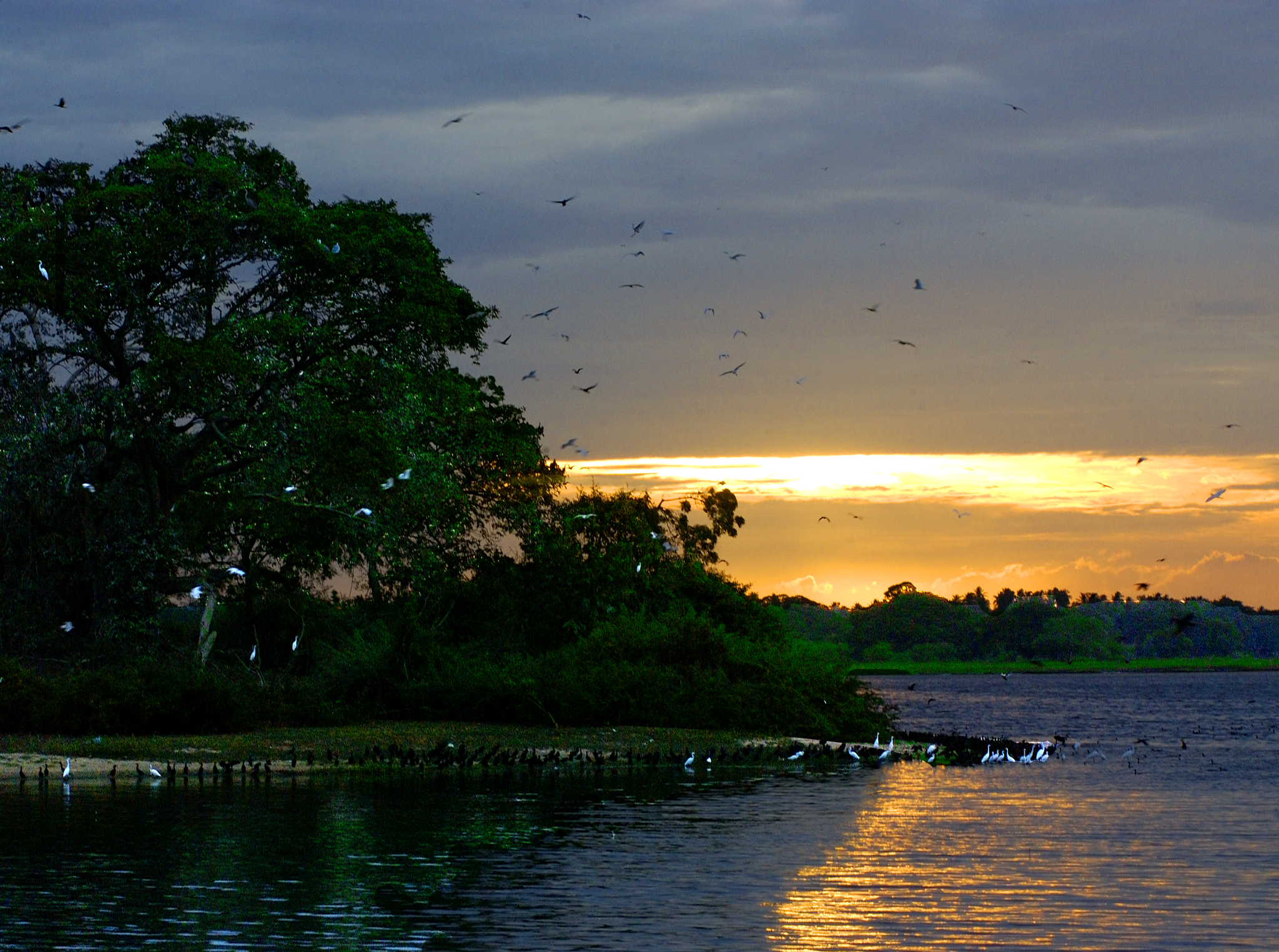
- Sunset near Kirinda

- Location within Sri Lanka
- Location: Southern Province, Sri Lanka
- Nearest city: Hambantota
- Coordinates: 6°12′50″N 81°13′30″E
- Area: 3,339.38 hectares (12.8934 sq mi) after regazzetting in 2004, originally of 6,216 hectares (24.00 mi^{2})
- Established: 1969 (sanctuary); 1993 (national park)
- Governing body: Department of Wildlife Conservation

Ramsar Wetland
- Official name: Bundala
- Designated: 15 June 1990
- Reference no.: 487

Bundala National Park is an internationally important wintering ground for migratory water birds in Sri Lanka. Bundala harbors 197 species of birds, the highlight being the greater flamingo, which migrate in large flocks. Bundala was designated a wildlife sanctuary in 1969 and redesignated to a national park on 4 January 1993. In 1991 Bundala became the first wetland to be declared as a Ramsar site in Sri Lanka. In 2005 the national park was designated as a biosphere reserve by UNESCO, the fourth biosphere reserve in Sri Lanka. The national park is situated 245 kilometres (152 mi) southeast of Colombo.

== History ==
The area was declared a wildlife sanctuary on 5 December 1969, and was upgraded to a national park on 4 January 1993 with land area of 6,216 hectares (24.00 sq mi). However the park was regazetted in 2004 and the original park was reduced to 3,698 hectares (14.28 sq mi). In 1991, Bundala became the first site in Sri Lanka to be designated a Ramsar wetland. In 2005, Bundala was declared a Man and Biosphere Reserve by UNESCO. In January 2006, an area adjacent to Bundala covering an area of 3,339.38 hectares (12.8934 sq mi) was declared as the Wilmanna Sanctuary.

== Physical features ==
The area mainly underlain with hornblende-biotite gneiss of the eastern Vijayan series. The low country dry zone climate prevails in the area. The area has an average relative humidity of 80%. The national park contains five shallow, brackish lagoons with salt pans in three. They are Bundala lagoon of 520 hectares (2.0 sq mi), Embilikala Lagoon of 430 hectares (1.7 sq mi), Malala Lagoon of 650 hectares (2.5 sq mi), Koholankala lagoon of 390 hectares (1.5 sq mi), and Mahalewaya of 260 hectares (1.0 sq mi). The Koholankala and Mahalewaya are almost totally developed for salt production. The climatic conditions are tropical monsoonal, with a mean annual temperature of 27 °C (81 °F). Annual rainfall ranges from 900–1,300 millimetres (35–51 in), with dry period persists from May to September. The elevation of the park ranges from sea level to 10 metres (33 ft). The park was affected by 2004 Indian Ocean tsunami. Due to protection from sand dunes the park received very little damage.

== Flora ==
The ecological areas of the national park contain seven terrestrial habitat types and six wetland types. The dry thorny shrubs and herbs being the most abundant plant life. A total of 383 plant species belonging to 90 families have been recorded from the park. "The Phytoplankton in all the lagoons is dominated by blue-green algae" including species such as Macrocystis, Nostoc, Oscillatoria. Hydrilla is in abundance in Malala-Ambilikala Lagoons. Water hyacinth, water lilies, and Typha angustifolia reed beds are found in the marshes and streams. The vegetation mainly consists of Acacia scrubs including Dichrostachys cinerea, Randia dumetorum, Ziziphus sp., Gymnosporia emarginata, Carissa spinarum, Capparis zeylanica and Cassia spp. The trees of the forest are Bauhinia racemosa, Salvadora persica, Drypetes sepiaria, Manilkara hexandra (Palu in Sinhalese), and less common Chloroxylon swietenia, Azadirachta indica, and Feronia limonia. Halophyte plants thrive in the national park's environmental conditions. Salicornia brachiata and Halosarcia indica are examples of salt-tolerant plants. In the small degraded patch of mangrove found at the Bundala lagoon area, Lumnitzera racemosa trees are widespread. The strip of Palu tree Manilkara hexandra forest on the sand-dunes east of Bundala village is a unique type of forest in Sri Lanka.

== Fauna ==
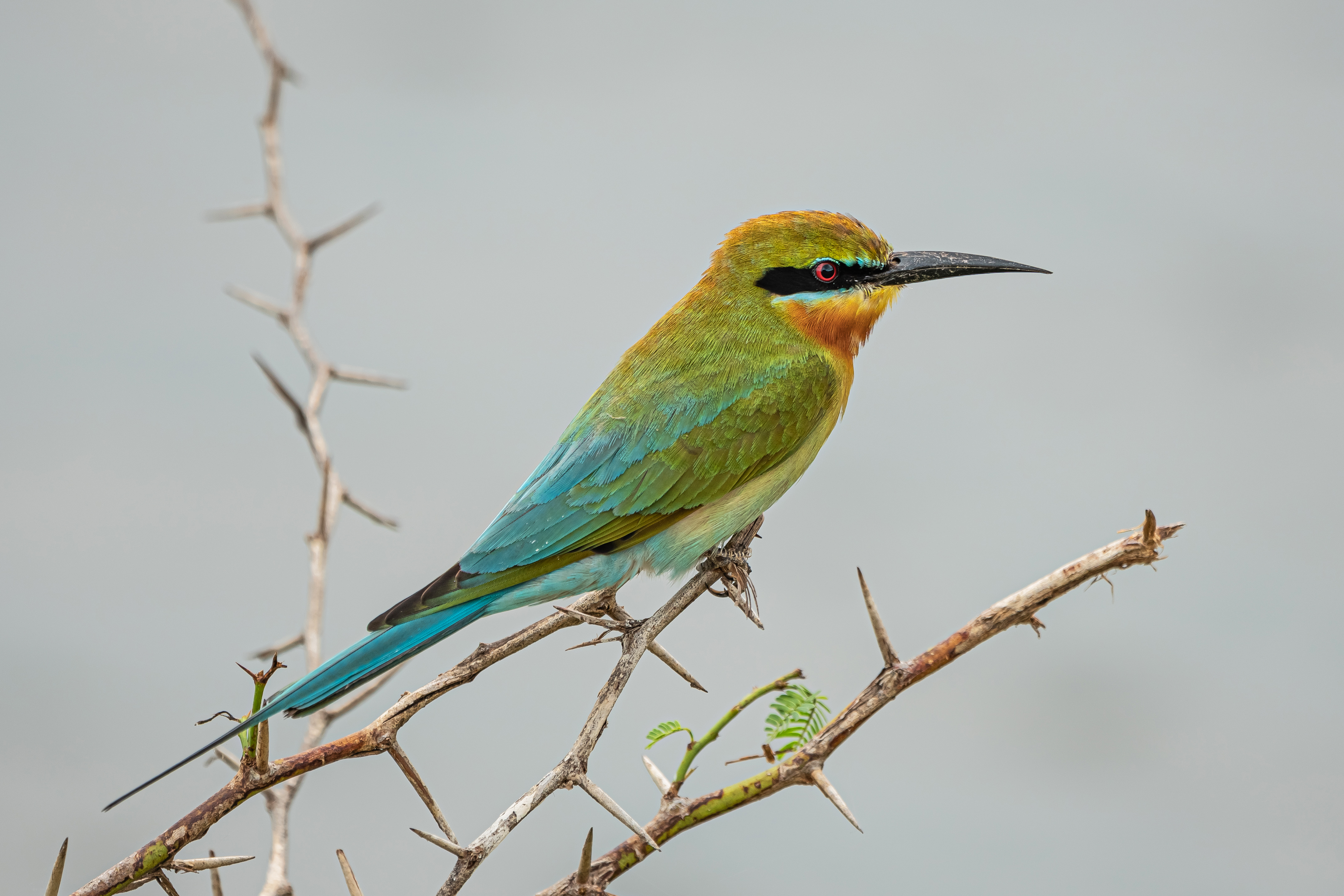
Blue-tailed bee-eater

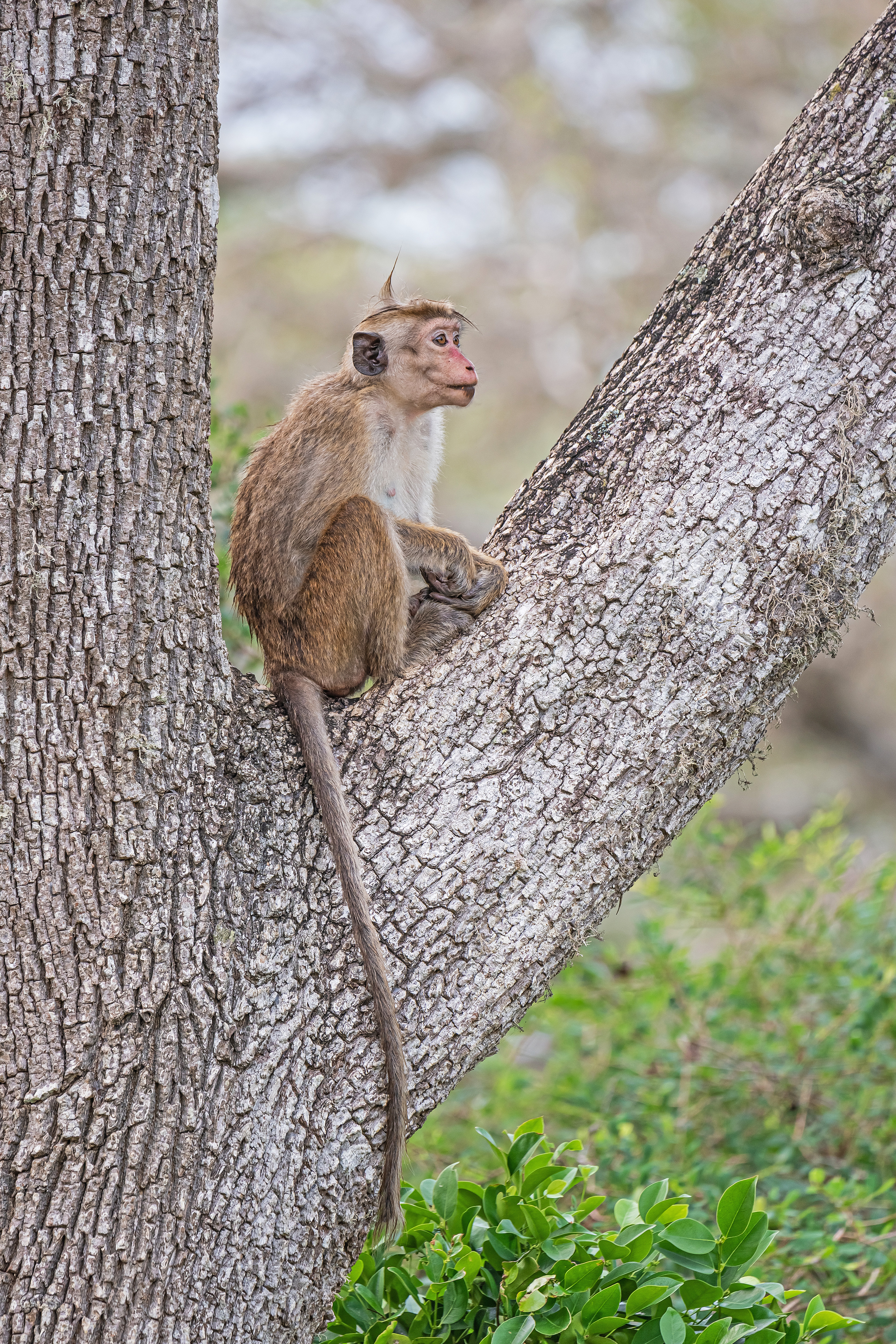
Toque macaque

The Bundala National Park has been identified as an outstanding Important Bird Area in the South Indian and Sri Lankan wetlands. 324 species of vertebrates have been recorded in the national park, which include 32 species of fish, 15 species of amphibians, 48 species of reptiles, 197 species of birds and 32 species of mammals. 52 species of butterflies are among the invertebrates. The wetland habitats in Bundala harbours about 100 species of water birds, half of them being migrant birds. Of 197 avifaunal species 58 are migratory species. National Bird Ringing Programme (NBRP) was launched in Bundala by in collaboration of Department of Wildlife Conservation and Field Ornithology Group of Sri Lanka in 2005.

The greater flamingo Phoenicopterus roseus which visits in large flocks of over 1,000 individuals, from Rann of Kutch of India is being the highlight. Waterfowl (lesser whistling duck Dendrocygna javanica, garganey Anas querquedula), cormorants (little cormorant Phalacrocorax niger, Indian cormorant P. fuscicollis), large water birds (grey heron Ardea cinerea, black-headed ibis Threskiornis melanocephalus, Eurasian spoonbill Platalea leucorodia, Asian openbill Anastomus oscitans, painted stork Mycteria leucocephala), medium-sized waders (Tringa spp.), and small waders (Charadrius spp.) are the other avifaunal species which are present in large flocks. Black-necked stork Ephippiorhynchus asiaticus, lesser adjutant Leptoptilos javanicus and Eurasian coot Fulica atra are rare birds inhabit in the national park.

A few Asian elephants (Elephas maximus) still inhabit the forests of Bundala. Other mammals seen in the park are toque macaque Macaca sinica, common langur Presbytis entellus, jackal Canis aureus, leopard Panthera pardus, fishing cat Felis viverrinus, rusty-spotted cat Felis rubiginosa, mongoose Herpestes spp., wild boar Sus scrofa, mouse deer Tragulus meminna, Indian muntjac Muntiacus muntjak, spotted deer Cervus axis, sambar C. Unicolor, black-naped hare Lepus nigricollis, Indian pangolin Manis crassicaudata, and porcupine Hystrix indica.

Bundala harbors various forms of fishes including salt water dispersants Anguilla bicolor, marine forms Ambassis gymnocephalus, brackish water forms Chanos chanos and freshwater forms Channa striata. Bundala's herpetofauna includes two endemic species, a toad and a snake, Bufo atukoralei and Xenochrophis asperrimus. Among reptiles are mugger crocodile Crocodylus palustris, saltwater crocodile Crocodylus porosus, Bengal monitor Varanus bengalensis, star tortoise Geochelone elegans, Indian python Python molurus, rat snake Pytas mucosus, endemic flying snake Chrysopelea taprobana, cat snakes Boiga spp. and whip snakes Dryophis spp. The adjacent seashore of Bundala is a breeding ground for all five species of globally endangered sea turtles that migrate to Sri Lanka.

== Threats and conservation ==
The water quality in the lagoons has changed by the drainage of excess water from irrigation systems, and release of sludge from the saltern into Bundala lagoon. The habitats of the wading birds and wildlife in the shrub forest and dunes is threatened as a result of the spread of two invasive alien plants, Prosopis juliflora and Opuntia dillenii, around the tidal plains in Malala-Ambilikala Lagoons and the sand dunes and nearby scrub forests. The spread of Prosopis juliflora is made easy by uncontrolled livestock herds.

The seeds of the Opuntia cactuses (called kathu potak in Sinhala) are spread by macaque monkeys, and perhaps other animals and birds, that eat the fruits. It is also spread by people cutting down the cactus but leaving the cuttings, which then re-sprout. No biological control measures have been carried out with the moth Cactoblastis cactorum so far. Manual removal of the cactuses will be impossible as the area where they have spread over is vast.

Conservation projects launched include a turtle conservation project, and an invasive alien plants eradication program aimed at the removal of Prosopis juliflora and Opuntia dillenii. The proposed conservation measures are re-demarcation of the park's boundary and widen the boundary to include the northern scrubland, resettle families inhabiting within the park, a programme to control spread of invasive alien plants, create irrigation structures to stop the flow of irrigation water and management of livestock grazing.

== See also ==
- Protected areas of Sri Lanka
