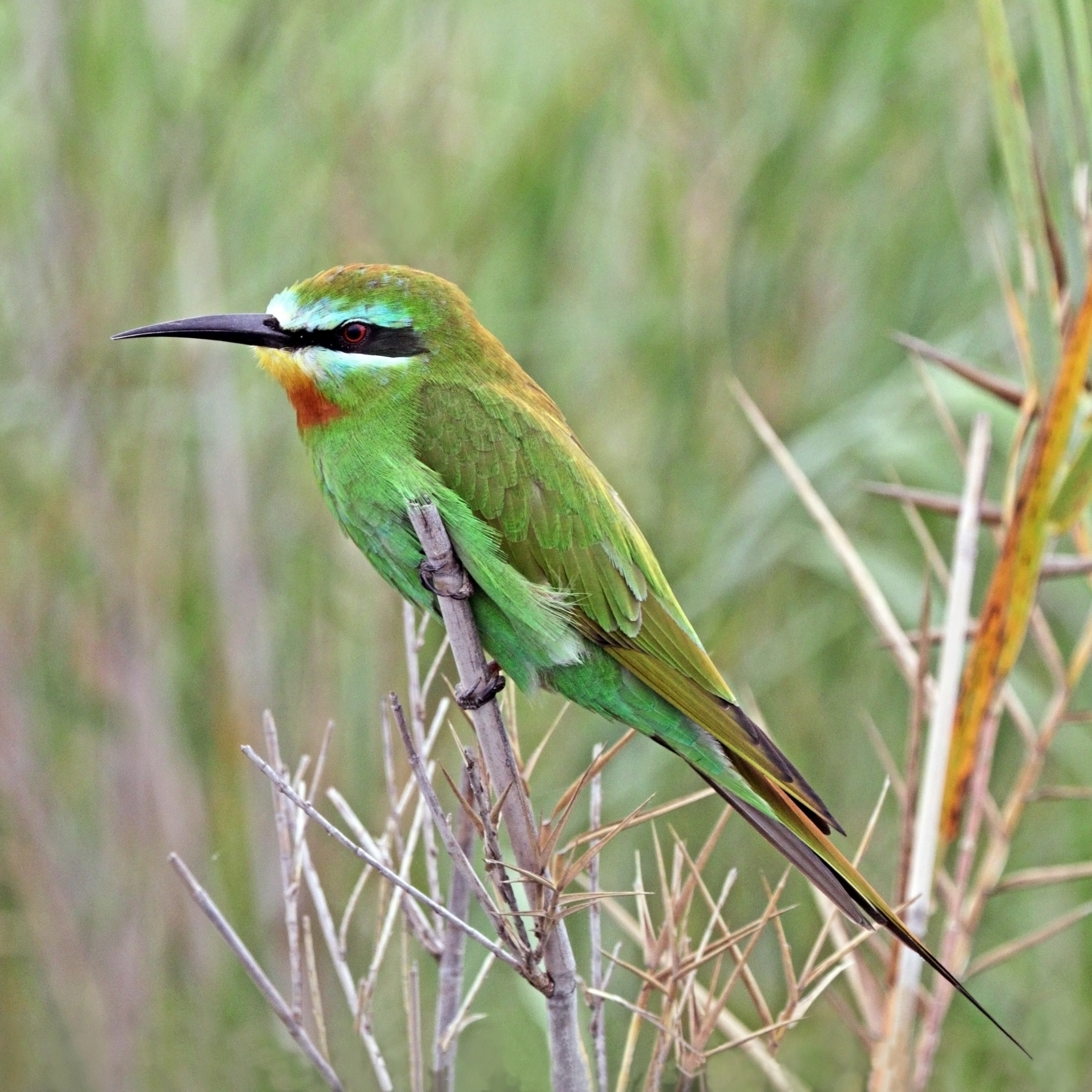
- M. p. persicus, Namibia
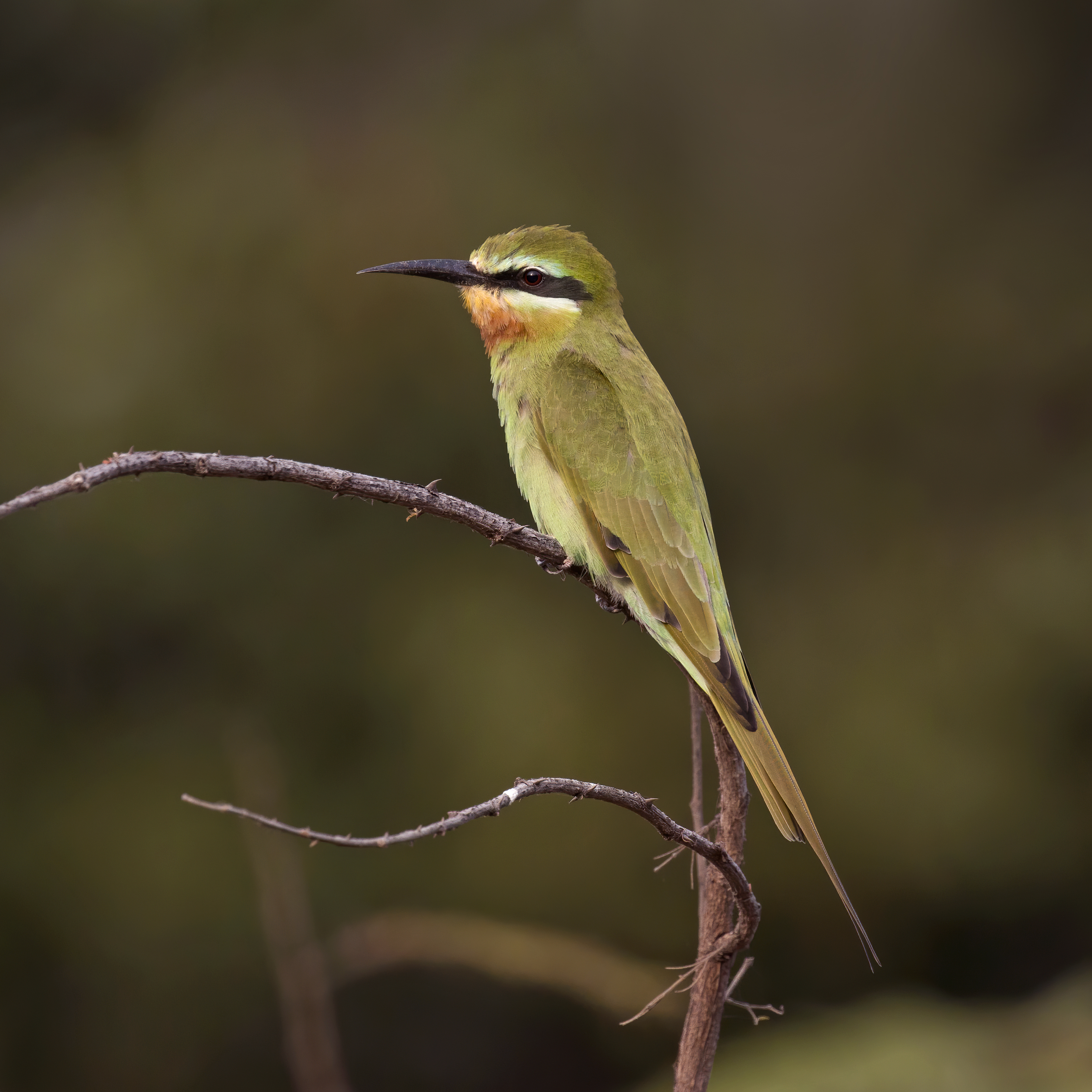
- M. p. chrysocercus, Senegal

Conservation status
- Least Concern (IUCN 3.1)

Scientific classification
- Kingdom: Animalia
- Phylum: Chordata
- Class: Aves
- Order: Coraciiformes
- Family: Meropidae
- Genus: Merops
- Species: M. persicus

Binomial name
- Merops persicus Pallas, 1773

= Blue-cheeked bee-eater =

Species of bird

The blue-cheeked bee-eater (Merops persicus) is a species of bee-eater that breeds in Northern Africa and the Middle East from eastern Turkey to Kazakhstan and India. It is generally strongly migratory, wintering in tropical Africa, although some populations are resident year-round in the Sahel. This species occurs as a rare vagrant north of its breeding range, with most vagrants occurring in Italy and Greece.

== Taxonomy and systematics ==
The genus name Merops is Ancient Greek for "bee-eater", and persicus is Latin for "Persian". Two subspecies of blue-cheeked bee-eater are accepted:

- Merops persicus persicus - Breeds in Asia, winters in East and Southern Africa.
- Merops persicus chrysocercus - Breeds in North Africa, winters in West Africa.

This species is closely related to the blue-tailed bee-eater, M. philippinus of East Asia, and the olive bee-eater of Africa, and has been treated as being the same species (conspecific).

== Description ==
This species, like other bee-eaters, is a richly coloured, slender bird. It is predominantly green; its face has blue sides with a black eye stripe, and a yellow and brown throat; the beak is black. It can reach a length of 31 cm (12 in), with the two elongated central tail feathers adding another 7 cm (2.8 in). Sexes are mostly alike but the tail-streamers of the female are shorter.

This is a bird which breeds in sub-tropical semi-desert with a few trees, such as acacia. It winters in open woodland or grassland. As the name suggests, bee-eaters predominantly eat insects, especially bees, wasps and hornets, which are caught in the air by sorties from an open perch. However, this species probably takes more dragonflies than any other food item. It also enjoys damselflies and lacewings. Its preferred hunting perch is telephone wires if available.

Blue-cheeked bee-eaters may nest solitarily or in loose colonies of up to ten birds. They may also nest in colonies with European bee-eaters. The nests are located in sandy banks, embankments, low cliffs or on the shore of the Caspian Sea. They make a relatively long tunnel of 1 to 3 m (3–10 ft) in length in which the four to eight (usually six or seven), spherical white eggs are laid. Both the male and the female take care of the eggs, although the female alone incubates them at night. Incubation takes 23–26 days.

The call sounds 'flatter' and less 'fluty' than the European bee-eater.

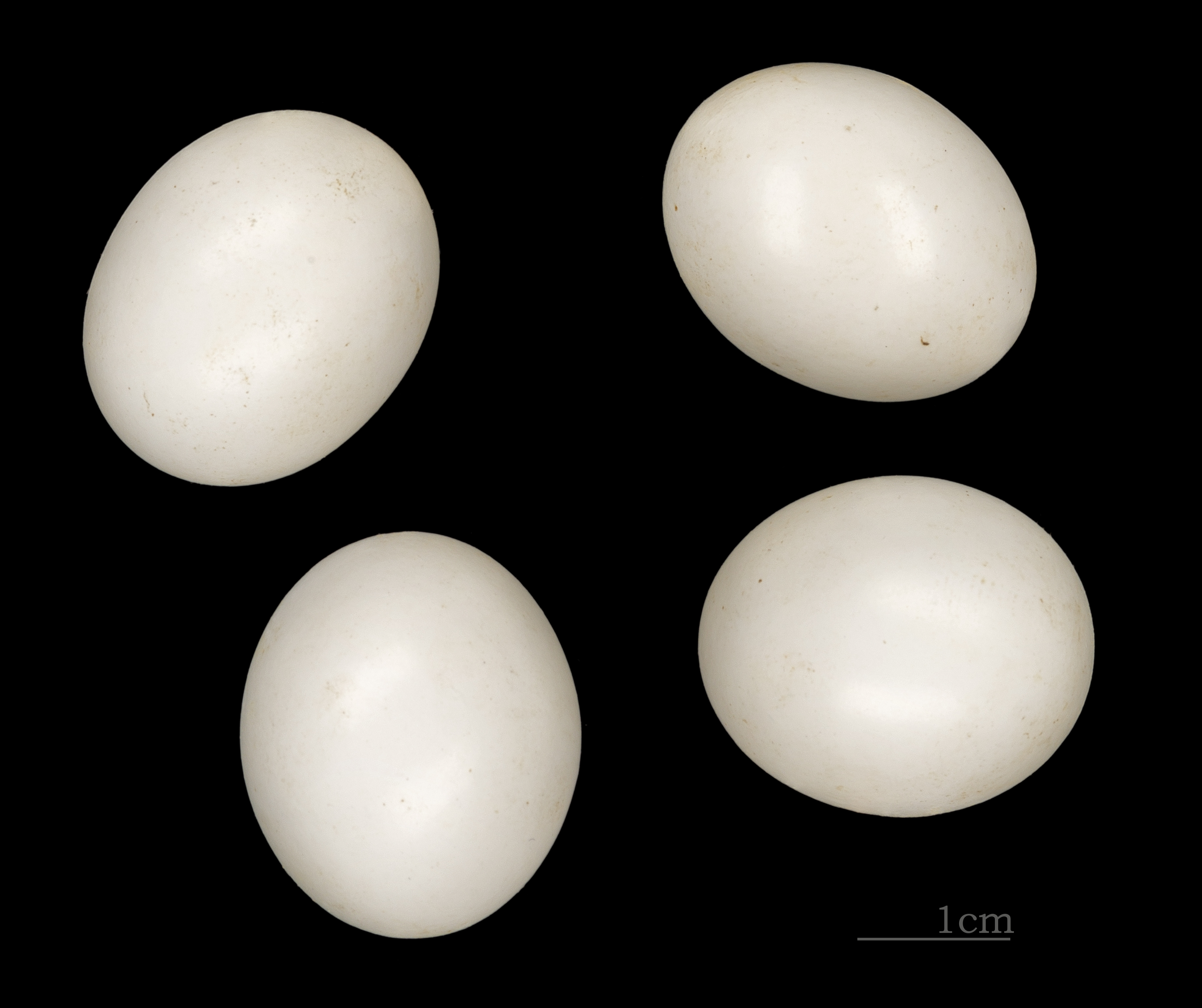
Blue-cheeked bee-eater eggs

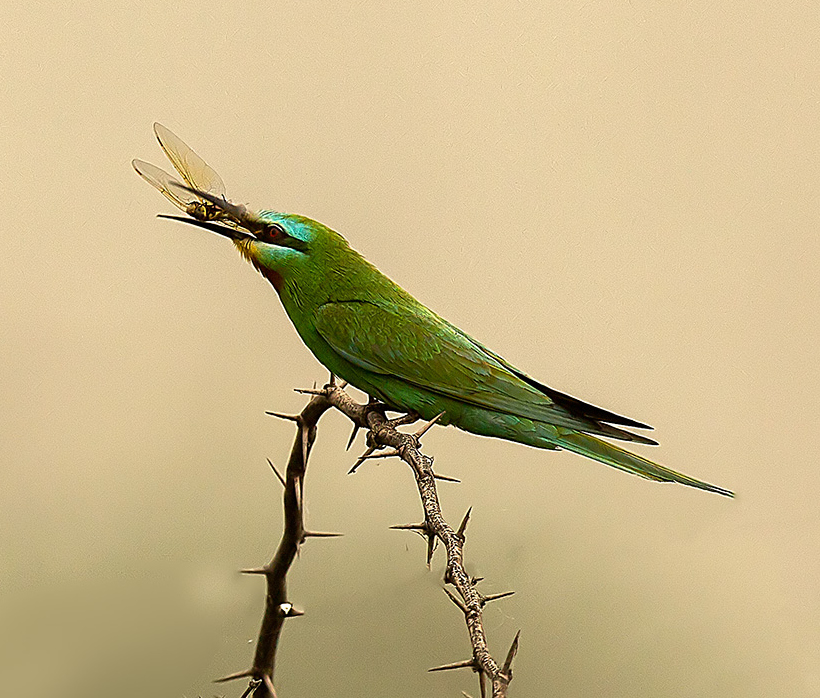
Blue-cheeked bee-eater with dragon fly kill
