= Malala-Ambilikala Lagoons =

Malala-Ambilikala Lagoons මලල-ඇඹිලිකල කලපු
- Location within Sri Lanka
- Location: Hambantota District, Sri Lanka
- Coordinates: 6°10′N 81°11′E
- Type: Lagoon
- Primary inflows: Malala-oya stream, Weligatta-aara stream, right bank channel of Lunugamvehera reservoir and Kirindi Oya Irrigation and Settlement Project (KOISP), surface drainage from and over flow from suburb tanks (Bandagiriya, Keligama, wewa, Julagamuwala wewa, Arabedda, Udamalala wewa, Namada wewa)
- Primary outflows: Indian Ocean
- Catchment area: 402 square kilometres (155 sq mi)
- Basin countries: Sri Lanka
- Surface area: 10.8 square kilometres (4.2 sq mi)
- Average depth: 1 metre (3.3 ft)
- Surface elevation: Sea level
- Settlements: Hambantota

Malala-Ambilikala Lagoons (Sinhala: මලල-ඇඹිලිකල කලපු) are two interconnected coastal water-bodies located inside the Bundala National Park, Hambantota District in the Southern Province, Sri Lanka. It is 260 km (160 mi) from Colombo to the arid south. The Malala-Ambilikala Lagoons are two of the three key lagoons located within the Bundala Ramsar wetlands.

== Features ==
The Malala-Ambilikala Lagoons system is the main lagoon system situated in one of the three Ramsar sites within Sri Lanka, the Bundala National Park. The two lagoons are interconnected by a 3.1 kilometres (1.9 mi) long, meandering incised channel called 'Ooday' (Sinhala: ඌඩේ) in Sinhalese. Both the Malala and Ambilikala lagoons are shallow water bodies with average depths of 1.01 metres (3 ft 4 in) and 0.93 metres (3 ft 1 in) respectively. The water surface area of the Malala and Ambilikala lagoons are 650 hectares (1,600 acres) and 430 hectares (1,100 acres) respectively. While the Ambilikala lagoon is an inland freshwater lagoon with no direct outfall to the sea, the Malala (Saltern Sinhala: ලේවාය), as its name implies, is a lagoon which has a direct connection with the Indian Ocean at the Malala sea outfall (Sinhala: මෝදර). Inputs to the Ambilikala and Malala lagoons include agricultural drainage, runoff with cattle refuse, and salt water when the sand bar between the Malala Lagoon and the sea is breached. Malala lagoon receives freshwater from Malala Aara, Heen Aara and Palalgawala Aara streams, surface drainage and overflow from Nadada wewa tank. The main freshwater supplies of Ambilikala lagoon are streams such as Weligatta Aara, Sundiram Aara, Ethuklbokka Aara, Right Bank Channel of the Lunugamvehera Reservoir, Kirindi Oya Irrigation and Settlement Project (KOISP), and surface drainage and overflow from tanks such as Bandagiriya, Keligama wewa, Julgamuwala (Divulgama) wewa, Arabedda, Udamalala wewa. The total hydro-catchment of the lagoon system is about 402 km^{2} (155 sq mi).

== Environmental problems ==
The hydrological, ecological and biological condition of the Malala and Ambilikala lagoon systems started to change rapidly with irrigation, agriculture, and human settlements in the upstream area, especially water quality problems affected the functioning of the lagoon ecosystem. The Kirindi Oya Irrigation Settlement Project expanded the irrigation area from 4,200 ha (10,000 acres) to 10,450 ha (25,800 acres) during the early 1990s which located upstream of the Bundala National Park. The Malala and Ambilikala lagoons were severely affected by the modified drainage flows from the Kirindi Oya Irrigation Settlement Project and the Bandagiriya irrigation scheme. The estimated monthly load of total nitrogen (TN) and total phosphorus (TP) in to the Malala-Ambilikala lagoon system from the agricultural drainage were 6,490 kilograms (14,310 lb) and 620 kilograms (1,370 lb) respectively. An extinction of species and changes to habitat diversity were also observed in the lagoon system due to water quality changes. In addition to that, Increasing inflows and decreasing salinity in the lagoon water has caused severe socio-economic problems to the people who relies lagoon resources for livelihoods. A decline in shrimp (Metapenaeus sp. and Penaeus sp.) and new fish species (Alectis ciliaris and Etroplus suratensis) with less commercial value were observed due to a significant decrease in salinity levels.

== Research ==
A number of studies have been carried out recently on ecohydrology and socio-hydrology of the Malala and Ambilikala lagoons.

1. Comparative study of effect of agricultural runoff on Malala - Embilikala lagoons in Sri Lanka.
2. Irrigation Water Management and the Bundala National Park.
3. Human impact and the status of water quality in the Bundala Ramsar wetland lagoon system in Southern Sri Lanka.
4. Finding a long-lasting solution for problems created by increased flow into Malala-Embilikala Lagoon system.
