= Field Ornithology Group of Sri Lanka =

Sri Lankan wildlife conservation organization

- Abbreviation: FOGSL
- Formation: 1976
- Founder: G.B.P Karunaratna; Rex I. de Silva; G.L de Silva; L.B Ranasingha; S.W Kotagama; L.H Jayawikrama; S.V.K Ekaratne
- Type: Non-profit organization
- Purpose: Conservation of birds and education
- Headquarters: Department of Zoology, University of Colombo
- Location: Colombo, Sri Lanka
- Members: 600
- Key people: Sampath Seneviratne (President); Sarath Kotagama (Former President)
- Affiliations: BirdLife International
- Staff: 4
- Website: fogsl.cmb.ac.lk

Field Ornithology Group of Sri Lanka (Sinhala: ශ්‍රී ලංකා ක්ෂේත්‍ර පක්ෂි විද්‍යා කවය, romanized: śrī laṁkā kṣētra pakṣi vidyā kavaya), commonly abbreviated FOGSL, is the Sri Lankan affiliate of BirdLife International. It was founded in 1976 to promote the conservation of birds and preservation of the environment. FOGSL headquarters are situated in the Department of Zoology, University of Colombo, Sri Lanka. Its president is Professor Nihal Dayawansa.

== Activities and events ==
Identifying and proposing Important Bird Areas (IBAs) in Sri Lanka is one of the main activities of the group. This project has now entered its second phase, conducting studies to evaluate the biodiversity of proposed 70 IBAs. Conducting research on some selected endemic birds, the Sri Lanka blue magpie and spot-winged thrush, is another activity of the group. Following the events of the 2004 Indian Ocean tsunami, FOGSL provided some direct humanitarian assistance. The group helped in wetland restoration, rebuilding schools, and coastal land-use planning. National bird ringing programmes conducted in Bundala National Park concentrate on studies on migratory birds and the wetlands. The Field Ornithology Group intends to extend the research to other sites on the migration route and to develop a web database.

From 2008, Field Ornithology Group conducts a bird count in December in the lines of Christmas Bird Count by the National Audubon Society of the United States. Sri Lanka's location at the tip of the Indian subcontinent has made the island a termination point in the north–south bird migratory route. Organizing a bird education exhibition to promote awareness among general public is one of the annual programmes of the group. This commemorates the late P. B. Karunathna, who was a leading naturalist in the country and one of the founding members of the society.

In 2020 numerous hotels and resorts and travel agencies adopted FOGSL's "Bird Friendly Concept". This programme started in 1997. The project mainly focuses on foreign tourists.

=== Activities for youth ===
The FOGSL also organise activities for children. They have launched an "FOG Kids" programme, focusing on environmental education and field trips for children aged over 14. Another programme, called "Preserving Heritage for Tomorrow", was carried out in collaboration with Sri Lanka Telecom in 2007 to raise awareness on the conservation of the Sinharaja Forest Reserve. 180 students and 45 teachers from various schools participated in the programme.

== Publications ==
The small grants programme of the United Nations Development Programme granted the Field Ornithology Group US$20,308.00 for printing of selected publications and other activities. As part of their educational programmes, Field Ornithology Group has published many books and posters, not only on birds, but also mammals and wetlands. The FOGSL also publish two periodicals, Kedetta in Sinhala and Malkoha in English.
