= Pottuvil =

Pottuvil பொத்துவில் පොතුවිල
- Town
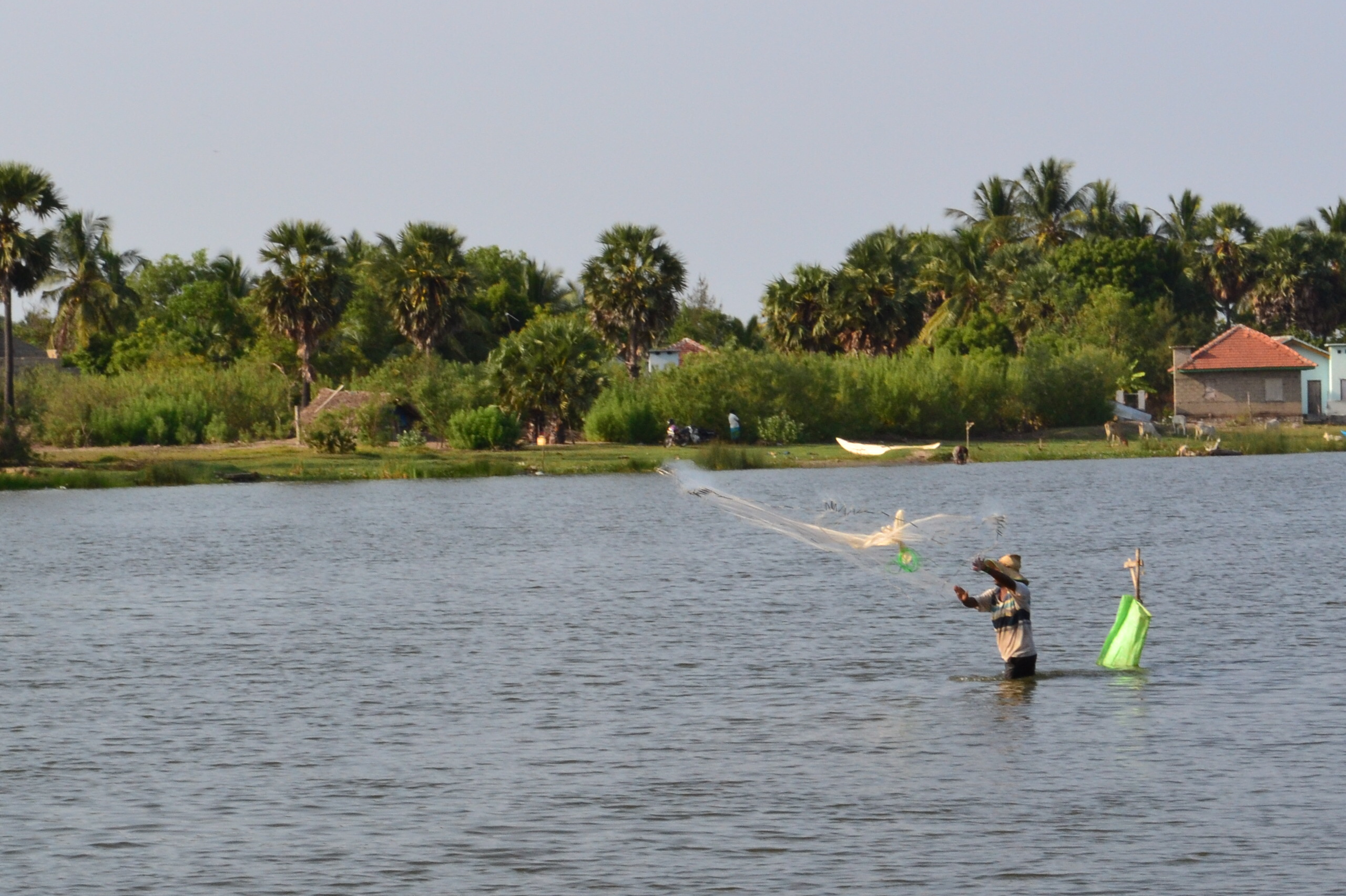
- Pottuvil, Sri Lanka, Fisherman trying to catch fish

- Location within Sri Lanka
- Coordinates: 6°52′0″N 81°49′0″E
- Country: Sri Lanka
- Province: Eastern
- District: Ampara
- DS Division: Pottuvil

Population
  - Total: 45,727

Pottuvil (Note: Also spelled Pothuvil, Poththuvil or Pothuwila) (Tamil: பொத்துவில், romanized: Pottuvil; Sinhala: පොතුවිල, romanized: Potuvil) is a town in the Ampara District of Sri Lanka, located in the Eastern Province on the eastern coast of the Island. It is situated 4 km (2.5 mi) north of the popular tourist destination Arugam Bay.

== Name ==
The romanized form Pothuwila and also Pothuvila are also common in English-language writings of Sinhalese writers, and on many webpages. Most Sinhala newspaper articles and Facebook pages refer to "Pothuvila", පොතුවිල.

== History ==
This town is mentioned in the Pali Chronicle known as the Cūḷavaṃsa, and the Vanni Raajaavalaiya. "Bodhivāla" is mentioned in the Cūḷavaṃsa (Chapter lvii, 54) in the context of the Principality of Ruhuna campaigns of Vijayabahu I. Archaeologists like Ellawala Medhananda Thero, and historians have discussed the place name while linguists recognize the change of "b" to "p" and the clear evolution of the modern name "Pothuvila" from Bodhivāla. "Vāla" means "water" (or also periphery) in compound usage as in "Aalavaala" (Sanskrit), a basin of water found at the root of a tree. "vāla" is also a type of jasmine, Pavonia odorata grown in temples.

Pottuvil was affected by the 2004 Indian Ocean tsunami. The town's population in 2007 was 33,625.

== Demographics ==
Pottuvil is a Muslim majority town. Tamils are the second largest group in the town. Other smaller groups are the Sinhalese and Indian Tamils.

=== Ethnicity in Pottuvil Town (2012) ===
Ethnicity in Pottuvil Town
Population	Percent
Muslims	93.10%
Tamils	6.50%
Sinhalese	0.90%
Indian Tamils	0.5%
Others	0.02%

Source:statistics.gov.lk

== Economy ==
Agriculture is generally seen as the basic economic route of the town, as well as animal husbandry, coastal and inland fisheries, tourism, and trade. It is evident that there are plenty of natural resources here. Paddy fields, forests, beaches, mountains and springs are parts of the town's landscape. Paddy is the main crop in the area. Coconut cultivation is carried out on a small scale in the coastal villages of Komari, Manarasena, Victor Garden, Hitayapuram, Urani and Ullai. In addition, chilli is the main vegetable crop.

The city is also known for its beaches and the world-famous Arugam Bay for surfing. The nearby beaches are also known as Ullai Beach.

== Climate ==
Pottuvil has a tropical savanna climate (Köppen: As) with warm to hot temperatures and a significant amount of rainfall. The climate is characterized by a distinct wet season from October to February. The wet season features cooler temperatures than the rest of the year.

Climate data for Pottuvil (1991–2020)
Month	Jan	Feb	Mar	Apr	May	Jun	Jul	Aug	Sep	Oct	Nov	Dec	Year
Record high °C (°F)	32.3 (90.1)	33.1 (91.6)	34.8 (94.6)	37.8 (100.0)	38.9 (102.0)	38.3 (100.9)	38.6 (101.5)	38.7 (101.7)	39.0 (102.2)	37.8 (100.0)	34.6 (94.3)	34.2 (93.6)	39.0 (102.2)
Mean daily maximum °C (°F)	29.9 (85.8)	30.6 (87.1)	32.0 (89.6)	33.1 (91.6)	34.5 (94.1)	35.0 (95.0)	34.3 (93.7)	34.2 (93.6)	33.8 (92.8)	32.4 (90.3)	30.9 (87.6)	29.9 (85.8)	32.6 (90.7)
Daily mean °C (°F)	26.0 (78.8)	26.7 (80.1)	27.7 (81.9)	28.8 (83.8)	30.1 (86.2)	30.3 (86.5)	29.7 (85.5)	29.6 (85.3)	29.5 (85.1)	28.3 (82.9)	27.1 (80.8)	26.2 (79.2)	28.3 (82.9)
Mean daily minimum °C (°F)	22.1 (71.8)	22.8 (73.0)	23.4 (74.1)	24.5 (76.1)	25.4 (77.7)	25.3 (77.5)	25.1 (77.2)	25.0 (77.0)	24.9 (76.8)	24.2 (75.6)	23.3 (73.9)	22.5 (72.5)	24.0 (75.2)
Record low °C (°F)	8.6 (47.5)	18.1 (64.6)	17.5 (63.5)	17.6 (63.7)	21.2 (70.2)	19.5 (67.1)	22.0 (71.6)	22.8 (73.0)	23.3 (73.9)	20.1 (68.2)	16.9 (62.4)	14.2 (57.6)	8.6 (47.5)
Average precipitation mm (inches)	263.0 (10.35)	136.8 (5.39)	61.4 (2.42)	68.3 (2.69)	48.2 (1.90)	13.7 (0.54)	17.1 (0.67)	18.8 (0.74)	52.4 (2.06)	134.5 (5.30)	307.6 (12.11)	306.5 (12.07)	1,428.2 (56.23)
Average precipitation days (≥ 1.0 mm)	10.1	7.7	5.3	4.9	3.6	2.2	2.1	2.7	4.3	9.0	14.6	13.3	79.9
Source: NOAA

== See also ==
- Pottuvil massacre
- Muhudu Maha Viharaya
