= Protected areas of Sri Lanka =

Protected areas of Sri Lanka are administrated by Department of Forest Conservation and Department of Wildlife Conservation of Sri Lanka.There are 501 protected areas in Sri Lanka. The protected areas that fall under supervision of the Department of Forest Conservation include forests defined in National Heritage Wilderness Area Act in 1988, forest reservations, and forests managed for sustainability. Sinharaja Forest Reserve is an example for a National Heritage forest (it is also a World Heritage Site). There are 32 forests categorized as conservation forests including Knuckles Mountain Range. Strict nature reserves, national parks, nature reserves, forest corridors, and sanctuaries recognized under the Flora and Fauna Protection Ordinance are managed by Department of Wildlife Conservation. Total of all protected areas is 1,767,000 ha. Protected areas in Sri Lanka account for 26.5 percent of the total area. This is a higher percentage of protected areas than in all of Asia and much of the World.

== Biodiversity ==
Plant diversity and endemism in Sri Lanka are quite high. Of 3,210 flowering plants belonging to 1,052 genera, 916 species and 18 genera are endemic. All but one of Sri Lanka's more than 55 dipterocarp (Sinhalese "Hora") are found nowhere else in the world. Sri Lanka's amphibian diversity is only becoming known now. Sri Lanka may be home to as many as 140 species of amphibians. More than 50 known freshwater crabs are confined to Sri Lanka.

== Deforestation ==
Between 1990 and 2000, Sri Lanka lost an average of 26,800 ha of forests per year. This amounted to an average annual deforestation rate of 1.14 percent . Between 2000 and 2005 this accelerated to 1.43% per annum.

== Conservation efforts ==
92 Key Biodiversity Areas (KBAs) have been identified through a process coordinated by the Wildlife Heritage Trust and University of Peradeniya. Many other data and published literature were also incorporated into the analysis, notably data on Important Bird Areas collected by the Field Ornithology Group of Sri Lanka. Nearly all of these KBAs lie in the wet zone in south western part of the country. These areas considered irreplaceable because all sites contain endemic species that found nowhere else, with some of them harboring more than 100 globally threatened species.

The flora and fauna of Sri Lanka are heavily understudied. For instance the Serendib scops owl was described and nine other bird species added to the list of endemics only in 2004. Thus the number of endemic species is likely to be a gross underestimate.

== Forest reserves and proposed reserves ==
A number of forest reserves and proposed reserves are managed by Department of Forest Conservation. These areas are ecosystems with rich biodiversity. Some of the forest reserves and proposed reserves include

- Bambarabotuwa
- Beraliya proposed reserve
- Dellawa proposed reserve
- Delwala
- Gilimale-Erathna
- Kalugala
- Kekunandura
- Kombala-Kottawa
- Malambure
- Morapitiya Runakanda
- Mulatiyana
- Nahitimukalana proposed reserve
- Oliyagankele
- Rammala Kanda
- Viharakele
- Yagirala

== Biosphere reserves ==
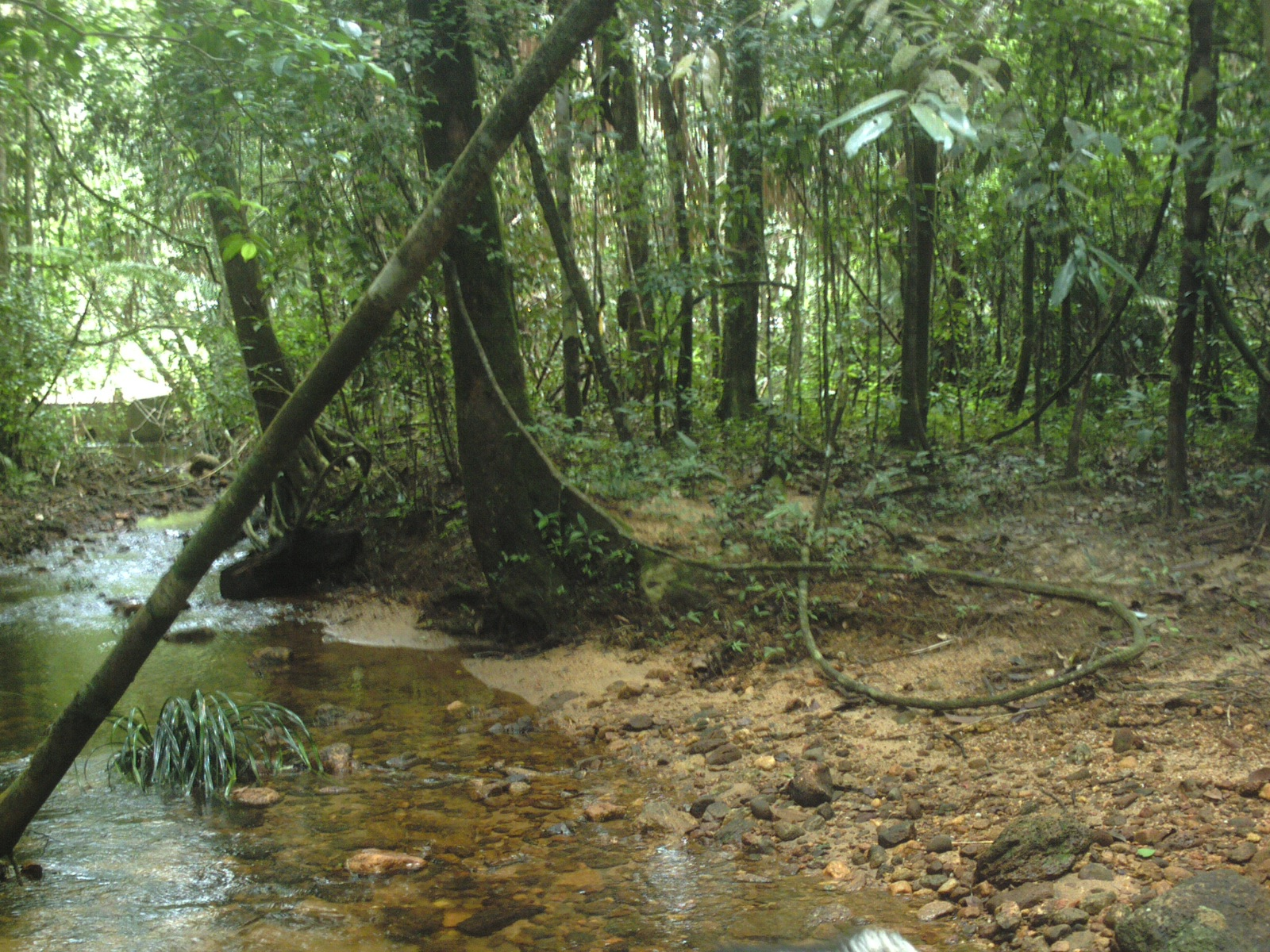
World Heritage Site, Sinharaja Forest Reserve is a protected area in Sri Lanka

There are four biosphere reserves declared under UNESCO's Man and Biosphere Reserve Programme. Those are Bundala, Hurulu, Kanneliya-Dediyagala-Nakiyadeniya (KDN) and Sinharaja. Apart from these international biosphere reserves there are national biosphere reserves being designated. Thirty-three are administrated by Department of Forest conservation and another four by Department of Wildlife Conservation.

== National protected areas ==
National protected areas are mainly classified into six types. The first four categories of protected areas cover all the ecological and regions of Sri Lanka. The 5th, 6th and 7th categories were introduced in 1993 by amending the Flora and Fauna Protection Ordinance. However, no regions have been declared under these categories so far.

1. Strict nature reserves
2. National parks
3. Nature reserves
4. Jungle corridors
5. Refuge
6. Marine reserves
7. Buffer zones
8. Sanctuaries

=== Strict nature reserves ===
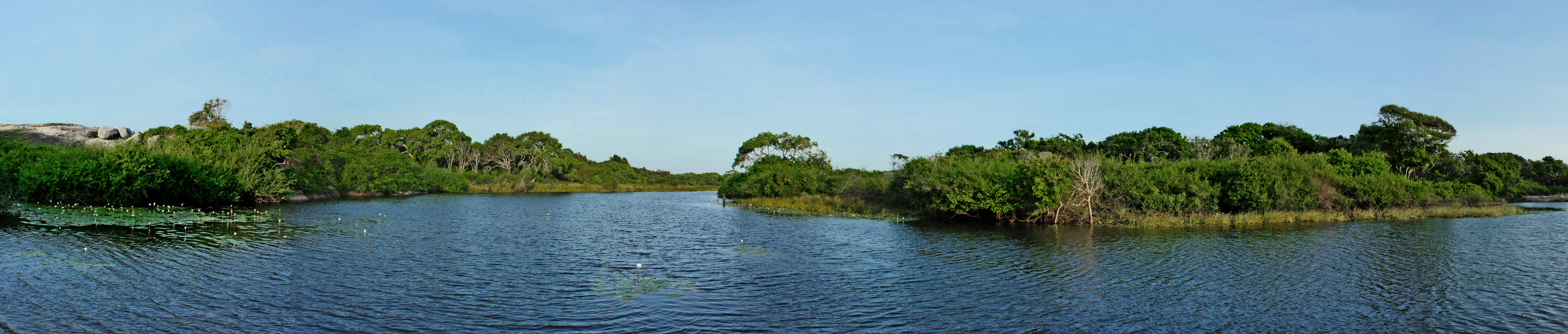
Panorama view of Okanda area, Yala East.

Human activities are restricted in SNRs and they are protected as a pure natural system. Researchers are allowed under the supervision of the Department of Wildlife Conservation staff and with the prior approval of the director.

Protected area	Area in ha	Date of declaration
Hakgala	1,141.6	1938-02-05
Yala	28,904.7	1939-03-10
Ritigala	1,528.1	1941-11-07

=== National parks ===
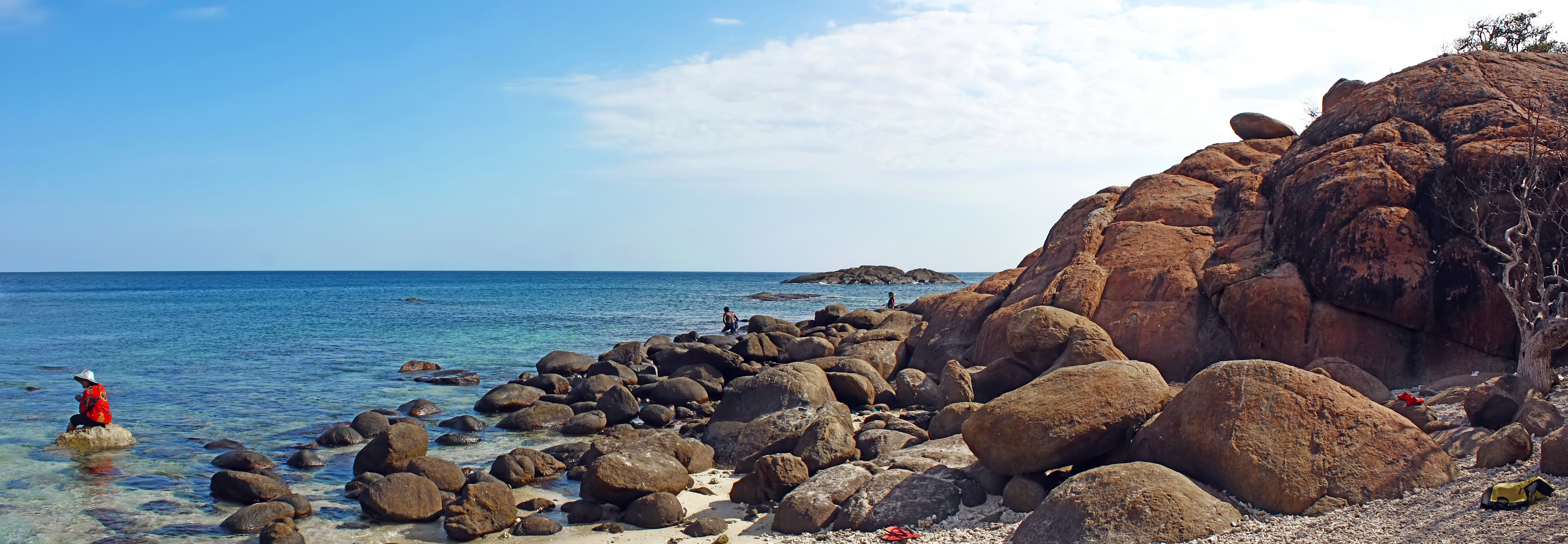
Pigeon Island National Park

National parks are areas allowed for the public to see and study wildlife. However necessary rules and regulations are introduced to protect wildlife and their habitats.

=== Nature reserves ===
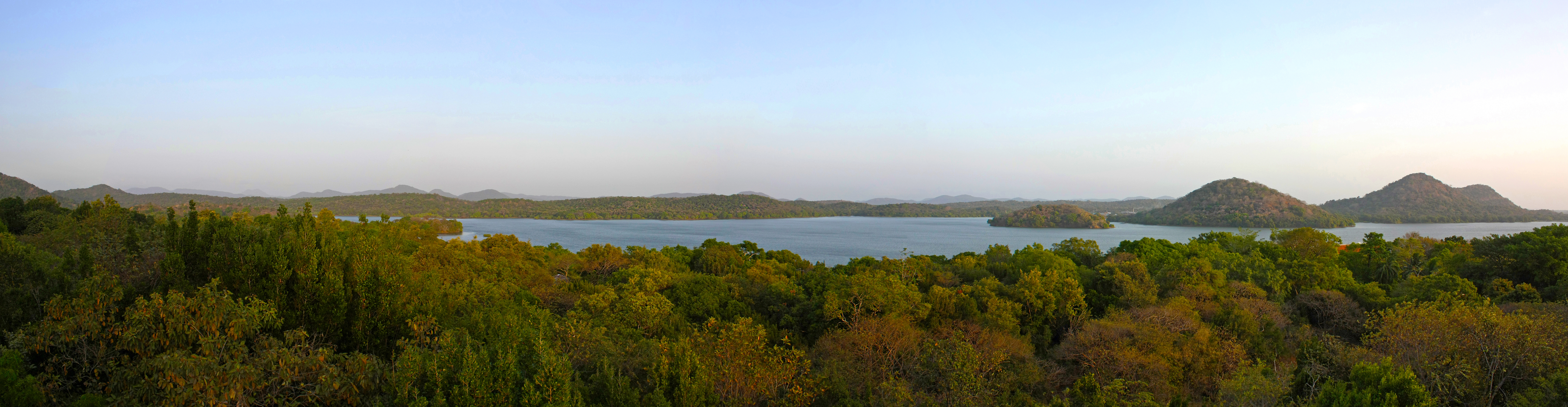
Giritale tank in panoramic view

Wildlife viewing and studying is restricted in these areas. Similar to Strict nature reserves scientific researches are encouraged under the supervision of Department of Wildlife Conservation staff. These areas differ from strict nature reserves by allowing traditional human activities to continue.

Protected area	Area in ha	Date of declaration
Triconamadu	25,019.3	1986-10-24
Riverine	824.1	1991-07-31
Minneriya-Girithale		
Block I	7,529.1	1988-02-12
Block II	1,923.6	1993-06-25
Block III	4,745.3	1995-07-07
Block IV	8,335.5	1997-09-01
Wetahirakanda	3,229	2002-06-07
Peak Wilderness	12,979	2007-09-21
Nagar kovil	7,882	2016-03-01
Vidataltivu	29,180	2016-03-01

=== Jungle corridors ===
The only jungle corridor declared under the accelerated Mahaweli Development Programme.

=== Sanctuaries ===
Sanctuaries ensure the protection of wildlife of private lands which outside the state claim. In the sanctuaries protection of habitat and allowing of human activities occur simultaneously. Permission is not required for entry to these lands.
