= Duttaphrynus atukoralei =

Conservation status
- Least Concern (IUCN 3.1)

Scientific classification
- Kingdom: Animalia
- Phylum: Chordata
- Class: Amphibia
- Order: Anura
- Family: Bufonidae
- Genus: Duttaphrynus
- Species: D. atukoralei

Binomial name
- Duttaphrynus atukoralei (Bogert and Senanayake, 1966)

Synonyms
- Bufo atukoralei Bogert and Senanayake, 1966

Species of amphibian

Duttaphrynus atukoralei (common names: Yala toad, Atukorale's dwarf toad) is a species of toad in the family Bufonidae. It is endemic to Sri Lanka where it is found on the coastal lowlands of southern half of Sri Lanka below 200 m (660 ft) asl.

== Etymology ==
The specific name atukoralei honors Mr. Vicky Atukorale, a Sri Lankan naturalist who collected the holotype .

== Habitat and conservation ==
D. atukoralei is a terrestrial toad found in wet evergreen tropical forests, dry lands, and areas of human habitation. It is a common species, and more common in areas outside primary forests. It is facing no major threats.
