= Maduru Oya National Park =

National park in Sri Lanka

- මාදුරු ඔය ජාතික වනෝද්‍යානය மாதுரு ஓயா தேசிய பூங்கா
- IUCN category II (national park)
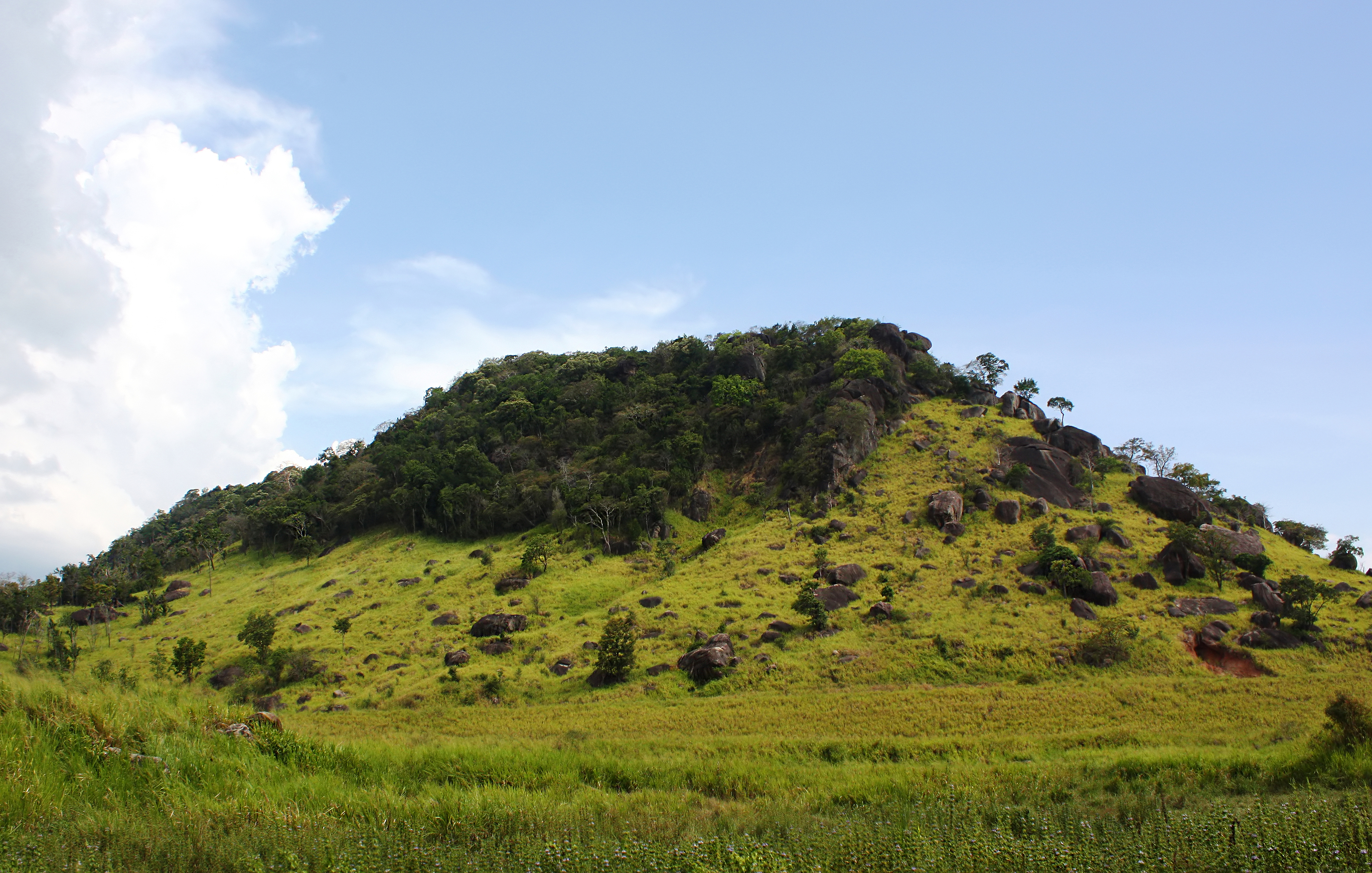
- A hill in Maduru Oya, near Maduru Oya Dam

- Location within Sri Lanka
- Location: Eastern and Uva Provinces, Sri Lanka
- Nearest city: Polonnaruwa
- Coordinates: 7°34′33″N 81°08′34″E
- Area: 58,850 hectares (227.2 mi^{2})
- Established: 1983
- Governing body: Department of Wildlife Conservation

Maduru Oya National Park (Sinhala: මාදුරු ඔය ජාතික වනෝද්‍යානය, romanized: Māduru Oya Jātika Vanōdyānaya; Tamil: மாதுரு ஓயா தேசிய பூங்கா, romanized: Māturu Ōyā Tēciya Pūṅkā) is a national park of Sri Lanka, established under the Mahaweli development project and also acts as a catchment of the Maduru Oya Reservoir. The park was designated on 9 November 1983. Providing a sanctuary to wildlife, especially for elephants and protecting the immediate catchments of five reservoirs are the importance of the park. A community of Vedda people, the indigenous ethnic group of Sri Lanka lives within the park boundary in Henanigala. The park is situated 288 kilometres (179 mi) north-east of Colombo.

== Physical features ==
Degradation of Precambrian rock has effected in the creation of a mature mantled and undulating peneplain, disturbed by many prominent remnants of erosion (rock outcrops) and ridges. Imposing topographic feature is the 8 kilometres (5.0 mi) long range of rocky mountains of the south-west of the park. The geographical regime includes alluvium deposits and Miocene limestone. The major soil type is the relatively fertile but easily eroded red earth. Water systems of the park made up 15% of the land area, include five reservoirs; Maduru Oya, Ulhitiya, Ratkinda, NDK, and Henanigala reservoirs and tributaries of the Mahaweli and Maduru Oya rivers. Situated in the dry zone of Sri Lanka, the climatic conditions are dominated by the north-east monsoon, which persists from October to February. The mean annual rainfall is 1,650 millimetres (65 in) and the mean annual temperature is about 27 °C (81 °F), and overall evapotranspiration rates usually exceed precipitation levels.

== History and cultural heritage ==
Maduru Oya National Park is one of the four national parks designated under the Mahaweli Development Project. The other three are Wasgamuwa, Flood Plains, and Somawathiya. An ancient sluice on the old ruptured earthen bund of the Maduru Oya was discovered in the 1980s. The sluice made up of stone slabs and bricks, is about 30 feet (9.1 m) high, 30 feet (9.1 m) wide and 219 feet (67 m) long. The upper sluice was built in two phases, the first of which dates to before the 6th century BC. The lower sluice is believed to be older than that. Buddhist ruins of shrines, temples, dagobas, statues, and hermitages are found in Henanigala, Kudawila, Gurukumbura, Ulketangoda, and Werapokuna belonging to various periods of Sri Lankan history. Early Brahmi inscriptions from first to third century AD have been discovered in Kandegamakanda. Vedda people, the indigenous people of Sri Lanka, numbering less than a thousand people, live in Kandeganwela, Kotatalawa, Dambana and other places before the declaration of the park. The temple of Mahiyangana of great importance to the Veddas is situated outside the park. The Veddas, said to be descended from King Vijaya and Queen Kuveni, were living in Sri Lanka long before the arrival of the Sinhalese people from India 543 BC. They are traditionally hunters and gatherers and have increasingly relied on small cultivation for their livelihood. Although the community living in Dambana have preserved their traditional lifestyle to some degree.

== Flora ==
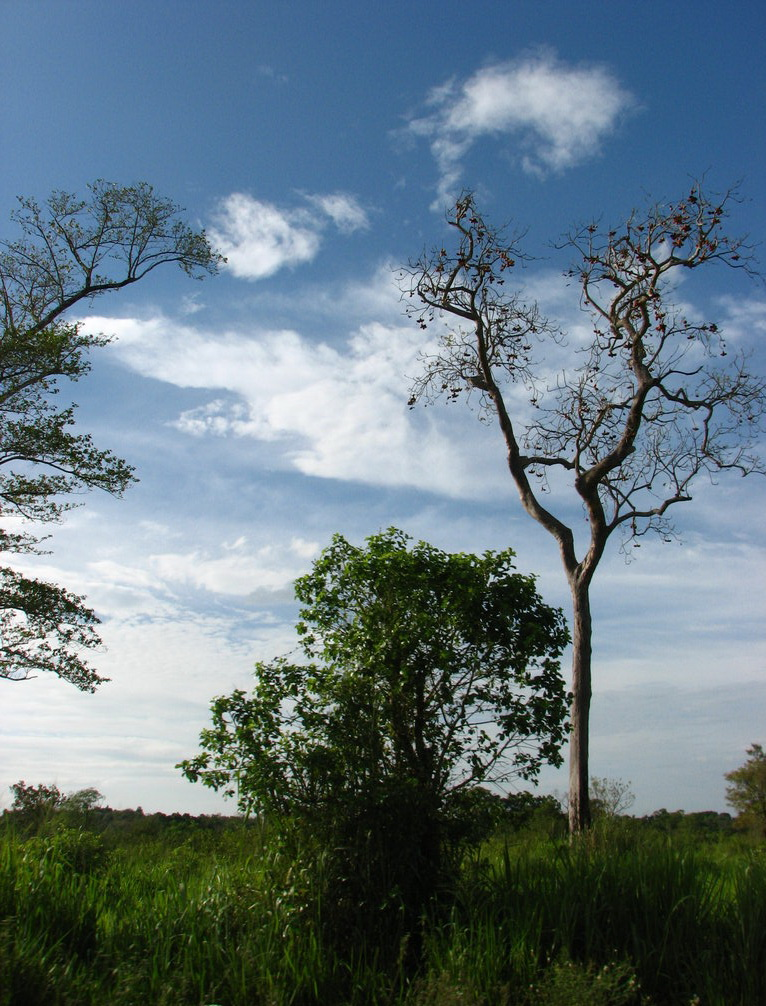
Many woody plants can be seen in the National Park

The park lies entirely in the dry zone although the park's southern boundary is near the intermediate zone. The climax community of the area is tropical dry mixed evergreen forests characterized by Drypetes sepiaria, Chloroxylon swietenia, Manilkara hexandra, Pterospermum canescens, wood apple Feronia limonia, Cassia fistula, and Dimorphocalyx glabellus. However a majority of the forests within the park had been severely exploited for shifting cultivation. This has effected in secondary forests and vast stretches of open plains dominated by grasses. The herbaceous stage is succeeded by shrubs and the thicket stage is characterized by Trema orientalis. Among the first trees to appear is Pterospermum canescens, Drypetes sepiaria, and Manilkara hexandra.

Maduru Oya Dam is surrounded by parkland, kept by periodic fires. A number of woody plants occur around the reservoir. A rare and endemic tree Vatica obscura, the only Dipterocarpaceae species to occur in the dry zone, is found in limited locations on the banks of the Maduru Oya and Gallodai Aru. Exotic teak Tectona grandis is included in the north-eastern region of the park.

== Fauna ==
The importance of the park's fauna is its richness, which includes a number of endemic species. Threatened mammal species include elephant Elephas maximus, of which there were 150-200 before the establishment of the park, sloth bear Melursus ursinus, leopard Panthera pardus, and water buffalo Bubalus bubalis. A 2007 study showed that the current elephant population was around 150 to 200. Other mammals are toque monkey Macaca sinica, common langur Presbytis entellus, jackal Canis aureus, fishing cat felis viverrina, wild boar Sus scrofa, Indian muntjac Muntiacus muntjak, spotted deer Cervus axis, and sambar C. unicolor. Small mammals include porcupine Hystrix indica, black-naped hare Lepus nigricollis, Indian pangolin Manis crassicaudata, squirrels, rats and mice. European otter Lutra lutra has also been reported in the park. Maduru Oya National Park is one of the recorded habitats of the grey slender loris Loris lydekkerianus.

The park's diverse aquatic avifauna includes painted stork Mycteria leucocephala, white-bellied sea eagle Haliaeetus leucogaster, grey pelican Pelecanus philippensis, great cormorant Phalacrocorax carbo , and little cormorant P. niger. Notable forest species are endemic Sri Lanka junglefowl Gallus lafayetii, the rare broad-billed roller Eurystomus glaucurus (possibly the only dry zone haunt), common tailorbird Orthotomus sutorius, shama Copsychus malabaricus, black-hooded oriole Oriolus xanthornus, and brown-capped pygmy woodpecker Yungipicus nanus. Endemic red-faced malkoha (Phaenicophaeus pyrrhocephalus) also occurs. The reservoirs harbor several species of bird including Oriental darter Anhinga melanogaster, spot-billed pelican Pelecanus philippensis, Asian openbill Anastomus oscitans, black-headed ibis Threskiornis melanocephalus, and Eurasian spoonbill Platalea leucorodia.

Park reptiles include the Indian star tortoise (Geochelone elegans), common monitor (Varanus bengalensis), water monitor (Varanus salvator), black-tailed python (Python molurus), krait (Bungarus spp.), common cobra (Naja naja), mugger crocodile (Crocodylus palustris), and estuarine crocodile (Crocodylus porosus). Other reptiles associated with aquatic habits are Indian black turtle (Melanochelys trijuga) and Indian flap-shelled turtle (Lissemys punctata). Of fishes barbs (Barbus spp.), giant gourami (Osphronemus goramy), snakeheads (Channa spp.), catfish (Siluriformes) and exotic tilapia (Tilapia mossambica) are predominant in the reservoirs.

== Conservation ==
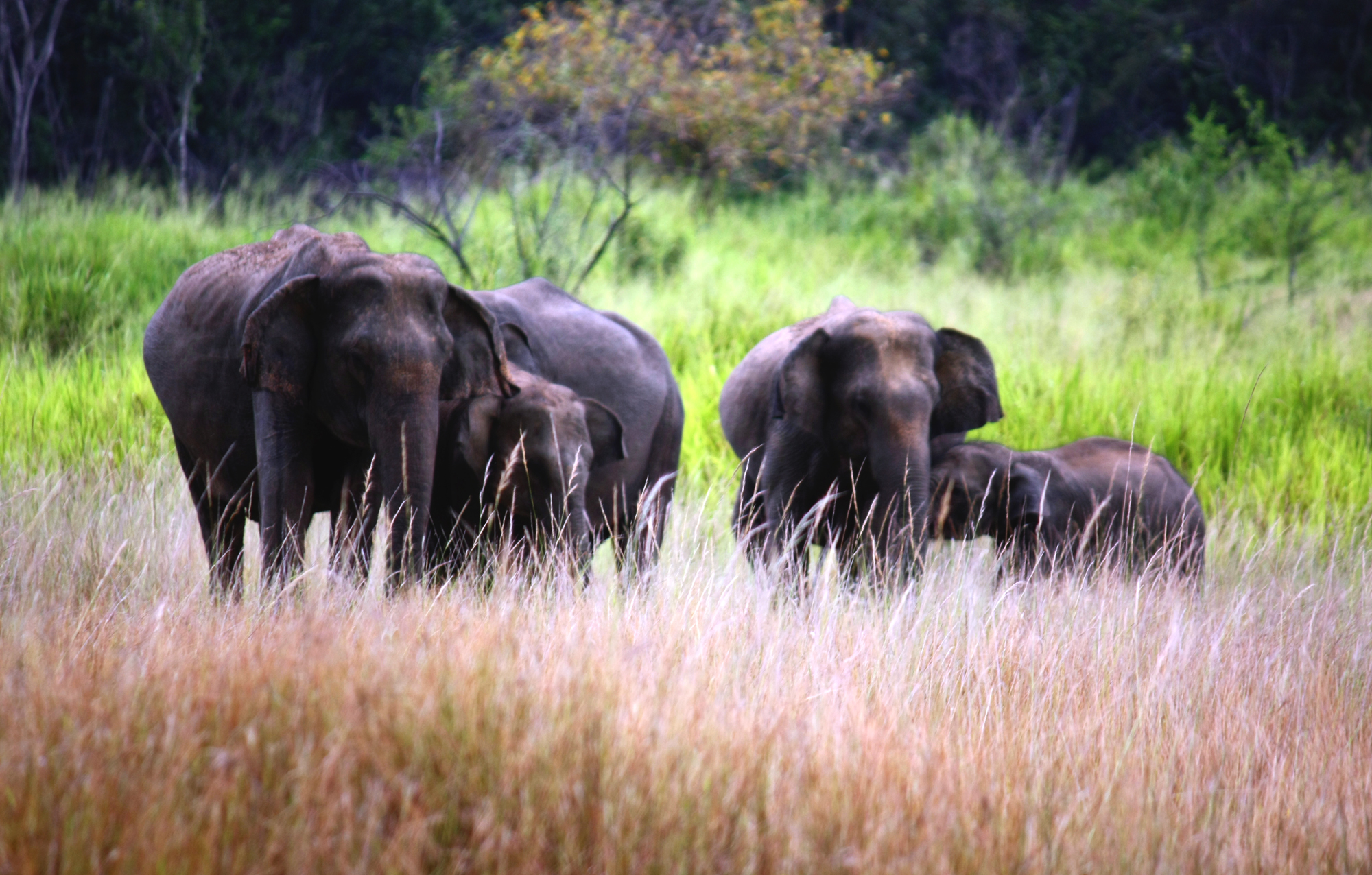
Sri Lankan elephants in the Maduru Oya National Park

Encroachment of the wetland area, poaching, illegal timber felling are serious problems within the national park. The park has been invaded by alien species Lantana camara. The Nilgala jungle corridor has been proposed to link Maduru Oya National Park with Gal Oya National Park which would provide a more contiguous wildlife habitat. Unplanned colonisation of land in the park by persons expecting to obtain land deeds to land under the Mahaweli development project is showing an increase. This has resulted in a considerable disturbance to the wildlife of the park. Since then the squatter number about 1500 has been resettled in established Mahaweli settlements. As part of Mahaweli Project Vedda people from several villages have been resettled in Henanigala. The removal of Veddas has been widely publicised. Feared effects of the Accelerated Mahaweli Development Programme include conflicting interests between wildlife and settlers in the areas of the park that are bordering the development area: elephants and wild boars raid and damage crops, while cattle and other domesticated animals trespass into the park. Constructing dam, tunnels and roads has caused badly scattered landscapes in few villages. Maduru Oya reservoir is covered with the harmful floating weed Salvinia molesta.

== See also ==
- Protected areas of Sri Lanka
