= Sri Lanka dry-zone dry evergreen forests =

Ecoregion in Sri Lanka

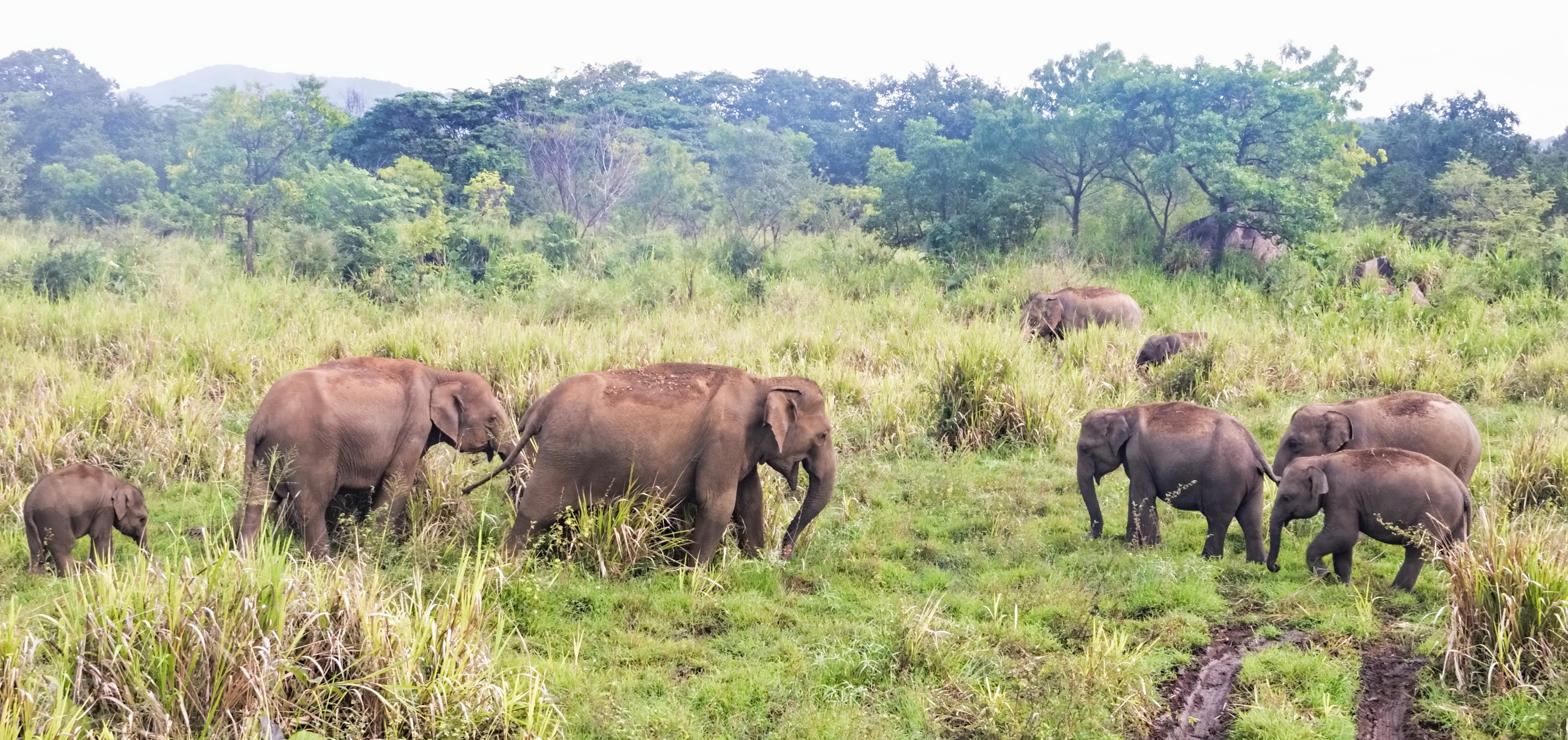
- Sri Lankan elephants in Hurulu Forest Reserve

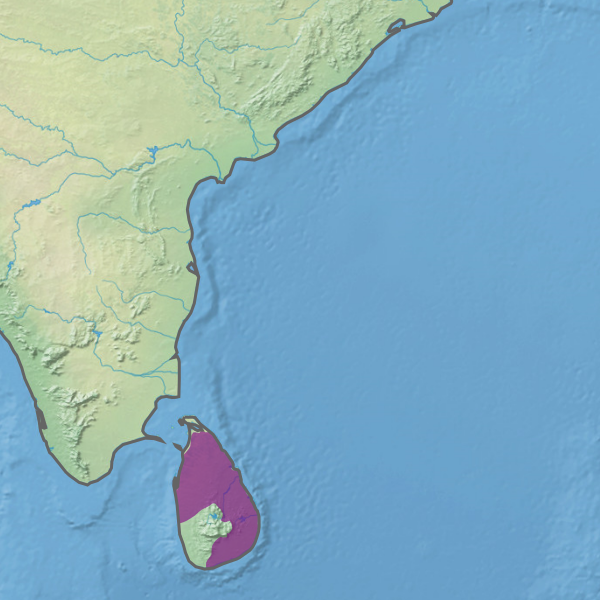
- Ecoregion territory (in purple)

Ecology
- Realm: Indomalayan
- Biome: tropical and subtropical dry broadleaf forests
- Borders: Deccan thorn scrub forests; Sri Lanka lowland rain forests; Sri Lanka montane rain forests

Geography
- Area: 47,759 km^{2} (18,440 sq mi)
- Country: Sri Lanka

Conservation
- Conservation status: vulnerable
- Protected: 17,736 km^{2} (37%)

The Sri Lanka dry-zone dry evergreen forests are a tropical dry broadleaf forest ecoregion of the island of Sri Lanka.

== Geography ==
The ecoregion covers an area of 48,400 square kilometers (18,700 sq mi), about 75%, of the island of Sri Lanka, with the exception of the islands' southwestern corner and Central Highlands, home to the Sri Lanka lowland rain forests and Sri Lanka montane rain forests ecoregions, respectively, and the northern Jaffna Peninsula, which is part of the Deccan thorn scrub forests ecoregion.

The topography is generally low, and the landscape is dotted with isolated inselbergs. The highest of these inselbergs is Ritigala (766 meters), which lies north of the Central Highlands.

== Climate ==
The ecoregion receives 1500–2000 mm of rainfall annually. Most rain falls during the December-to-March northeast monsoon season, and it is mostly dry the rest of the year.

== Flora ==
The ecoregion has several plant communities.

- Mixed dry evergreen forest is the most widespread plant community. Manilkara hexandra, Chloroxylon swietenia, and Drypetes sepiaria are characteristic trees, with Diospyros ebenum, Feronia limonia, Vitex altissima, Syzygium spp., and Chukrasia tabularis. In mature forests, the trees form a canopy of 13–20 meters, with sub-canopy and shrub layers. In areas of scrub and regenerating forest, Bauhinia racemosa, Pterospermum suberifolium, Cassia fistula, and Dichrostachys cinerea are typical. Acacia thorn scrub grows in disturbed areas.
- Talawa is a submontane savanna and grassland plant community, located on the eastern and southeastern slopes of the Central Highlands. Characteristic trees are Terminalia chebula, Terminalia bellirica, Pterocarpus marsupium, Butea monosperma, Careya arborea, and Anogeissus latifolia, and the characteristic shrubs Phyllanthus emblica and Zizyphus spp. Tall perennial grasses are the predominant ground vegetation, chiefly Cymbopogon nardus and Imperata cylindrica.
- Villu is a lowland grassland plant community of northeastern Sri Lanka's river floodplains. The dominant grasses are species of Cymbopogon, Eragrostis, Themeda, and Imperata.
- unique short-stature forests grow in the highest elevations of Ritigala, and are home to several endemic species.
- recently discovered unique dry canal-associated evergreen forest grow near the ancient canals of the Polonnaruwa kingdom, dominated by Vitex leucoxylon which represents half of the vegetation, and Terminalia arjuna, which is a common river forest tree, makes up only a fifth, but still holds the place as the second most common tree. other common vegetation in descending order are Margaritaria indicus, Tamilnadia uliginosa, Barringtonia acutangula and Hibiscus tiliaceus. The presence of savanna plants like Tamilnadia uliginosa and Antidesma ghaesembilla suggests origin of a now nonexistent savanna.

The Sri Lanka dry-zone dry evergreen forests are made up mostly of evergreen trees, which distinguish them from the deciduous trees that characterize most other tropical dry broadleaf forest ecoregions. The dry-zone dry evergreen forests most closely resemble the East Deccan dry evergreen forests of India's southeast coast.

== Fauna ==
The dry-zone dry evergreen forests are home to most of the Sri Lanka's 6000 Sri Lankan elephants (Elephas maximus maximus), the island's indigenous subspecies of Asian elephant.

== Protected areas ==
17,736 km^{2}, or 37%, of the ecoregion is in protected areas. Protected areas include:

- Angammedilla National Park (75.3 km^{2} (29.1 sq mi))
- Bundala National Park (62.2 km^{2} (24.0 sq mi))
- Flood Plains National Park (173.5 km^{2} (67.0 sq mi))
- Gal Oya National Park (259.0 km^{2} (100.0 sq mi))
- Horowpathana National Park (25.7 km^{2} (9.9 sq mi))
- Kaudulla National Park (69.0 km^{2} (26.6 sq mi))
- Kumana National Park (Yala East) (181.5 km^{2} (70.1 sq mi))
- Lahugala Kitulana National Park (15.5 km^{2} (6.0 sq mi))
- Lunugamvehera National Park (235.0 km^{2} (90.7 sq mi))
- Madhu Road National Park (163.7 km^{2} (63.2 sq mi))
- Maduru Oya National Park (588.5 km^{2} (227.2 sq mi))
- Minneriya National Park (88.9 km^{2} (34.3 sq mi))
- Pigeon Island National Park (4.7 km^{2} (1.8 sq mi))
- Ritigala Strict Nature Reserve (15.3 km^{2} (5.9 sq mi))
- Somawathiya National Park (376.5 km^{2} (145.4 sq mi))
- Udawalawe National Park (308.2 km^{2} (119.0 sq mi))
- Ussangoda National Park (3.5 km^{2} (1.3 sq mi))
- Wasgamuwa National Park (370.6 km^{2} (143.1 sq mi))
- Wilpattu National Park (1,316.7 km^{2} (508.4 sq mi))
- Yala National Park (Ruhuna) (978.8 km^{2} (377.9 sq mi))

== See also ==
- Deforestation in Sri Lanka
- Vanni
