= Somawathiya National Park =

National park in Sri Lanka

- IUCN category II (national park)
- Location within Sri Lanka
- Location: North Central and Eastern Provinces, Sri Lanka
- Nearest city: Polonnaruwa
- Coordinates: 8°07′15″N 81°10′08″E
- Area: 37,645.5 hectares (145.350 mi^{2})
- Established: 1966 (Sanctuary); 1986 (National park)
- Governing body: Department of Wildlife Conservation

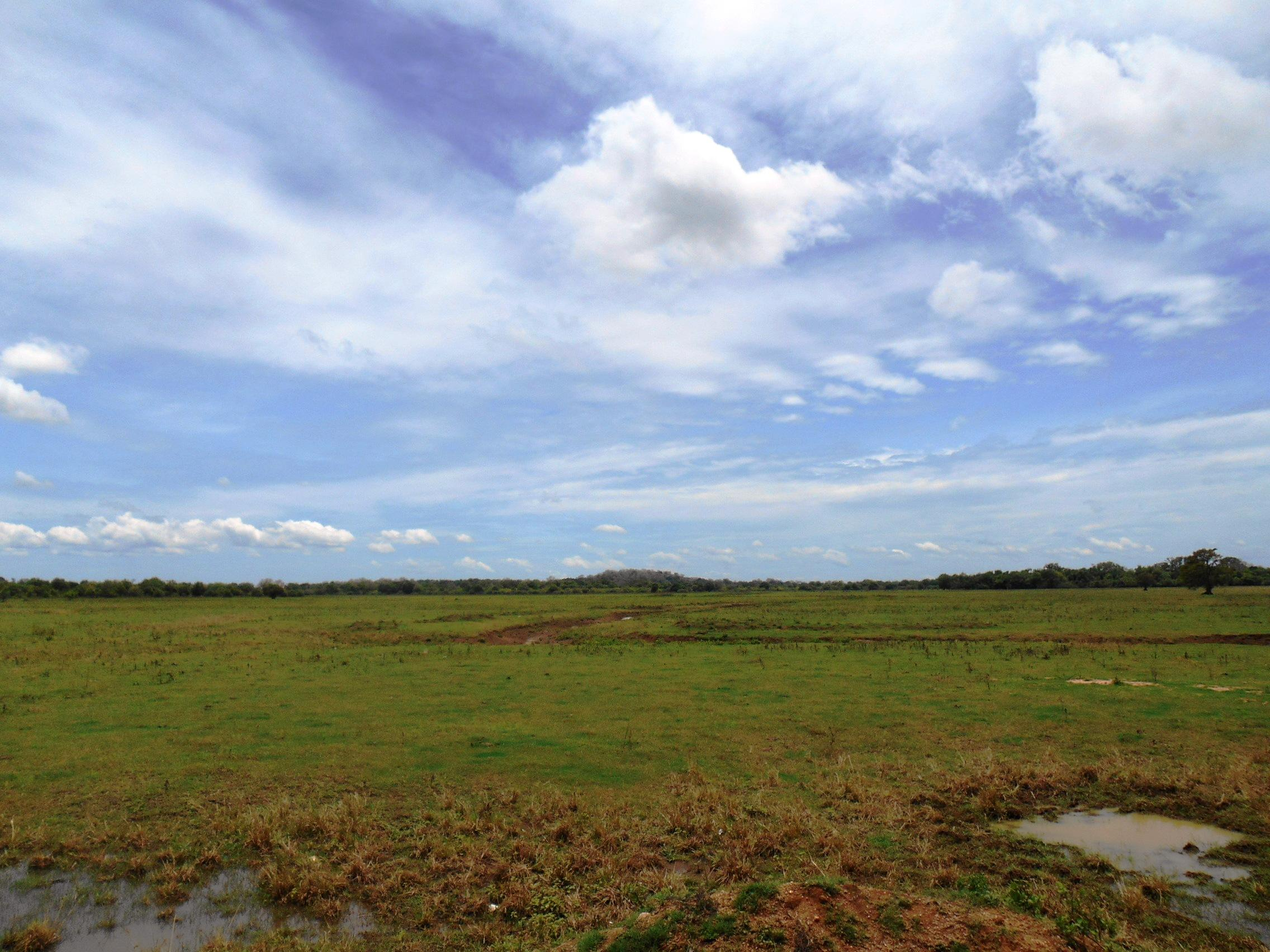
Somawathiya National Park

Somawathiya National Park is one of the four national parks designated under the Mahaweli River development project. Somawathiya Chaitya, a stupa said to be containing a relic of the tooth of the Buddha, is situated within the park. The park was created on 2 September 1986, having been originally designated a wildlife sanctuary on 9 August 1966. The park is home to many megaherbivores. The national park is located 266 kilometres (165 mi) north-east of Colombo.

== Physical features ==
Somawathiya National Park lies in the deltaic flood plains of the Mahaweli River and contains the junction where it is forked into two branches. The two branches are the Mahaweli River, which flows north into Koddiyar bay and the lesser Verugal Oya which flows north-east into the sea. The central riparian flood plain is featured by many old river channels and contain dispersed 'villus', the waterfilled basins around among the grassy plains. There are 20 such villus is located in the park. Somawathiya and Flood plains national parks are important protected areas for the wetland system of Mahaweli River flood plains. The high quality habitat of fertile alluvial underlying layer supports a plentiful wildlife.

== History ==
The historic Somawathiya Chaitya is located on the left bank of the Mahaweli River. The stupa was named after Princess Somawathi, the sister of King Kavan Tissa, and the wife of regional ruler Prince Abhaya. The prince Abhaya build the stupa to enshrine a relic of the tooth of the Buddha, which was in the possession of Arahat Mahinda, and named the stupa after the princes. Stupa is increasingly popular tourist and pilgrimage destination due to its fame as the site where miracles - beams of light and unusual apparitions - are often reported. The park is one of the four national parks set aside under the Mahaweli River development project. The other three national parks being Maduru Oya, Wasgamuwa and Flood plains. Somawathiya is contiguous with Flood Plains National Park and Trikonamadu Nature Reserve. Hurulu Forest Reserve, a part of which is a biosphere reserve is linked by the western arm of the park.

== Flora ==
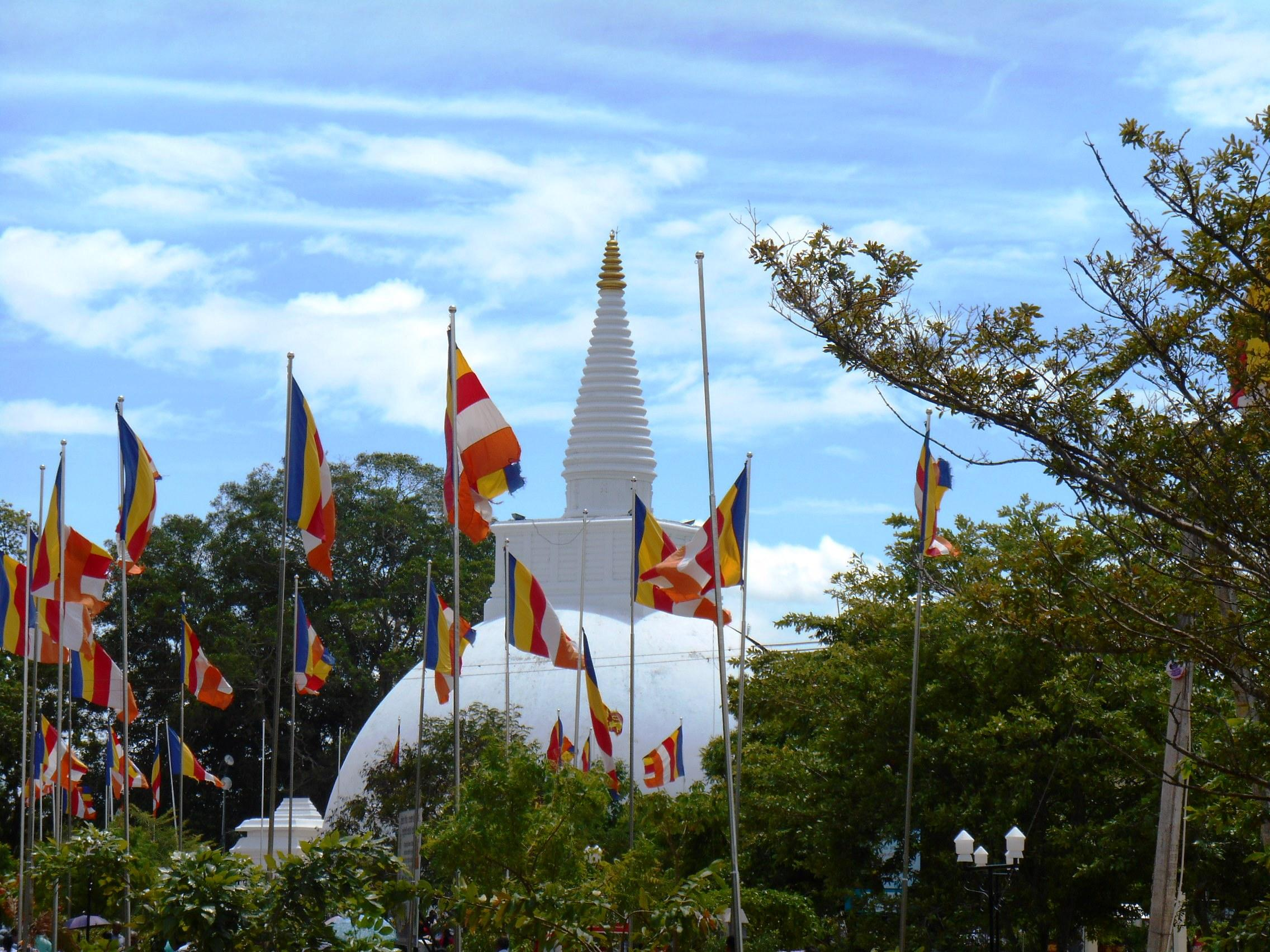
Somawathiya Chethiya

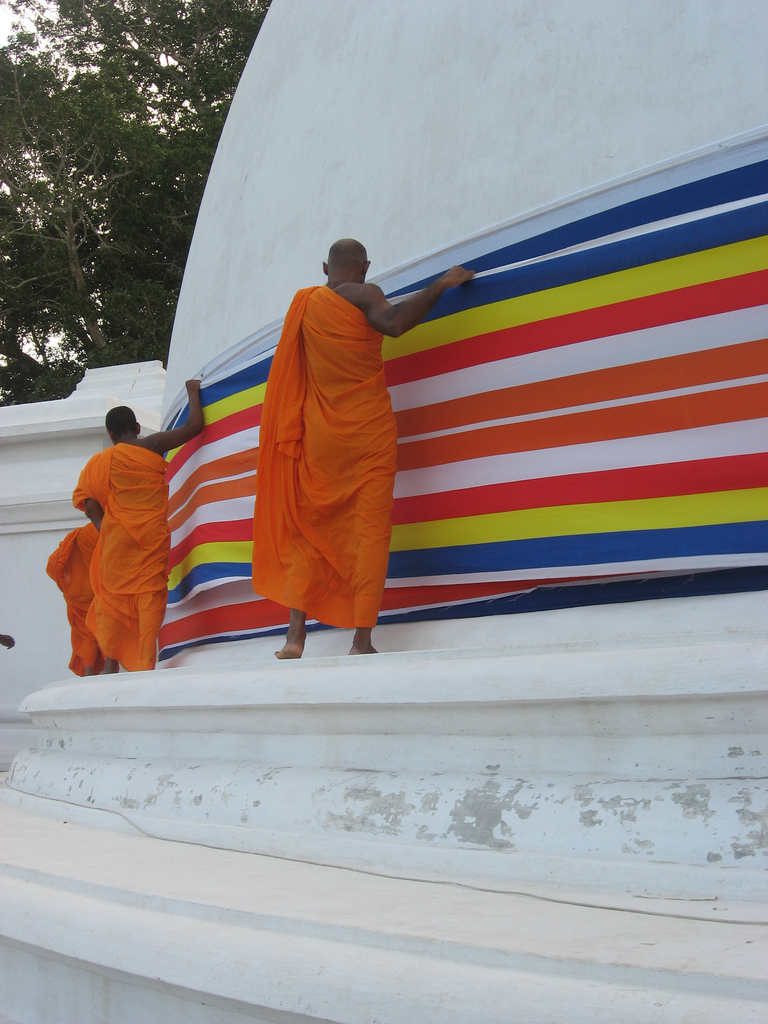
Buddhist bhikkus decorating the Somawathiya Chaitya

The waterfilled basins in the central flood plain are featured by the richness and predominance of the water-tolerant grasses and aquatic plants. The distribution of floral species in the villus shows a pattern, which is related to the period of inundation and the depth of flooding. On the edges, where wet conditions are temporary and with mild levels of flooding, there are creeping grasses such as Cynodon dactylon. Further towards the centre of the villus where the flooding is lengthier and truly hydrophytic species such as Alternanthera sessilis, Polygonum spp., Jussiaea repens, Ipomoea aquatica, Monochoria hastata, and Scirpus grossus appear. The most widespread grass species include Hygroryza aristata, Brachiaria mutica, Echinochloa colonum, Paspalum vaginatum, Digitaria longiflora, and Setaria (syn. Paspalidium) species. In a little deeper water, floating aquatic plants occur along with Nelumbo nucifera. Still in deeper water an association of manel Nymphaea stellata and the submerged aquatic plant Ceratophyllum demersum present. Some floating plants are common in all zones of the villus. Some tree species occur in the edges of the villus are Terminalia arjuna, Madhuca longifolia, Barringtonia asiatica, Mitragyna parvifolia, Erythrina variegata, and Hibiscus tiliaceus. In the northern region of the park, the forest trees teeming with species such as Drypetes sepiaria, Berrya cordifolia, Diospyros ovalifolia, Dimorphocalyx glabellus, Pterospermum canescens, Manilkara hexandra and Mitragyna parvifolia.

== Fauna ==
The importance of ecology of the park is due mainly to the wide occurrence of elephants Elephas maximus estimated at 400 within the protected area and adjacent surroundings and the rich avifauna. Although a 2007 study showed a much smaller herd of elephants in Somawathiya, 50-100 of individuals. Other notable mammalian species include jackal Canis aureus, fishing cat felis viverrina, rusty-spotted cat felis rubiginosa, leopard Panthera pardus, wild boar Sus scrofa, sambar Cervus unicolor, water buffalo Bubalus bubalis, porcupine Hystrix indica, and black-naped hare Lepus nigricollis.

The flood plain marshes are rich with avifauna. Around 75 migrant species winter in the marshes. Usual migrants include garganey Anas querquedula, marsh sandpiper Tringa stagnatilis, wood sandpiper T. glareola, pintail snipe Gallinago stenura, whiskered tern Chlidonias hybridus, and black-tailed godwit Limosa limosa. Resident birds are painted stork Ibis leucocephala, openbill stork Anastomus oscitans, little egret Egretta garzetta, cattle egret Bubulens ibis, pond heron Ardeola grayii, pheasant-tailed jacana Hydrophasianus chirurgus, purple gallinule Porphyrio porphyrio, white ibis Threskiornis melanocephalus, and black-winged stilt Himantopus himantopus. Within the forest area the following birds are seen, crimson-fronted barbet Megalaima haemacephala, common peafowl Pavo cristatus, Malabar pied hornbill Anthracoceros coronatus, thick-billed flowerpecker Dicaeum agile, common iora Aegithina tiphia, junglefowl Gallus lafayetii, and golden-fronted leafbird Chloropsis aurifrons. While barred buttonquail Turnix suscitator frequents the open areas, marshy northern area is visited by woolly-necked stork Ciconia episcopus, crested hawk eagle Spizaetus cirrhatus, grey-headed fish eagle Ichthyophaga ichthyaetus, pied kingfisher Ceryle rudis, crested serpent-eagle Spilornis cheela, and painted stork Ibis leucocephala.

== Conservation ==
Although the park area has been greatly exploited once the human activity is removed the regeneration will be quick, because of the moisture and high carrying capacity of the villus. Both Flood Plains National Park and Somawathiya National Park are excessively important for migratory and resident waterfowl. In general, the park has been much neglected. Although an overall systems plan is in place for protected areas within the Mahaweli Region. Until the area was incorporated into the Mahaweli Environment Project was unmanaged and unprotected to a great extent. The forests of the area have been cleared for cultivation, following the move in of the tobacco cultivators with their cattle. Tobacco cultivators enters annually with several heads of cattle. Deforestation has been more extensive since the mid-1970s. Illegal logging, tobacco cultivation and grazing by cattle was scheduled to reduce gradually with the declaration of the park.

== See also ==
- Protected areas of Sri Lanka
