= Hurulu Forest Reserve =

Biosphere reserve in Sri Lanka

- Location within Sri Lanka
- Location: North Central province, Sri Lanka
- Nearest city: Anuradhapura
- Coordinates: 8°12′36″N 80°50′59″E
- Area: 25.50 km^{2} (9.85 sq mi)
- Established: 1977
- Governing body: Department of Forest Conservation

Hurulu Forest Reserve of Sri Lanka was designated as a biosphere reserve in January 1977. The forest reserve is an important habitat of the Sri Lankan elephant. Hurulu forest reserve represents Sri Lanka dry-zone dry evergreen forests. There are many other protected areas situated around Hurulu Forest Reserve viz. Ritigala strict nature reserve, Minneriya-Girithale and Mahaweli flood plains nature reserves, Wasgamuwa National Park and Kahalla-Pallekele Sanctuary. Carved out at the edge of the Hurulu Forest Reserve is the Hurulu Eco Park which offers jeep safaris.

== Physical features ==
The annual mean temperature is 27.3 °C. and the area receives 1,600 mm of precipitation annually. A distinct dry season of three to six months persists during the months April/May to September. The elevation ranges from 90 m to 150 m above sea level.

== Flora and fauna ==
Chloroxylon swietenia (Sinhalese "Burutha"), Manilkara hexandra ("Palu") and Diospyros ebenum ("Kaluwara") are the dominant tree species. The Indian star tortoise, Sri Lanka junglefowl, Sri Lankan elephant, Sri Lanka leopard and rusty-spotted cat are among the endangered species of the forest reserve.

== Human impact ==
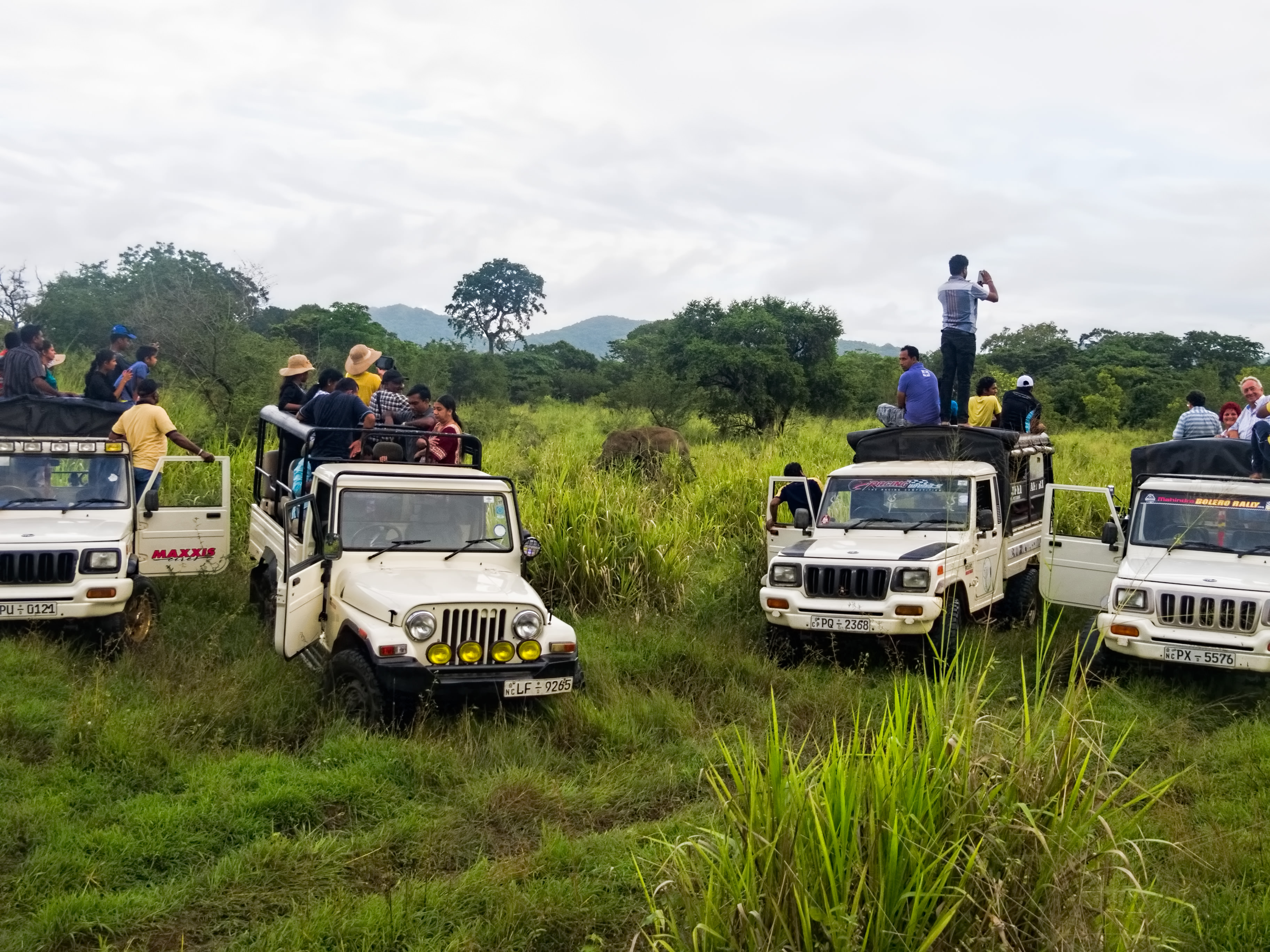
Safari jeeps of Hurulu Forest Reserve

There is no record of the number of people who live in the forest reserve. Shifting cultivation is their main means of living. The Sri Lankan elephant is known for its migratory behavior and does so especially in the dry season between the forests situated around the area. Expansion of human settlements and forest clearance resulted in a human–elephant clash. Translocation is the conventional solution taken to solve the issue.

But translocation has not been a good solution as some of the translocated elephants are returning to their original habitat. Recently a distinguished one-tusked adult male individual walk past Hurulu Forest reserve to reach its home, traveling for a month and 243 km after being translocated in Somawathiya National Park, 93 km away in a straight line. Its wanderings were tracked by a radio collar. Elephants' strong attachment to their home range is being credited for such returnings.

== Endangered animals of Hurulu Forest Reserve ==
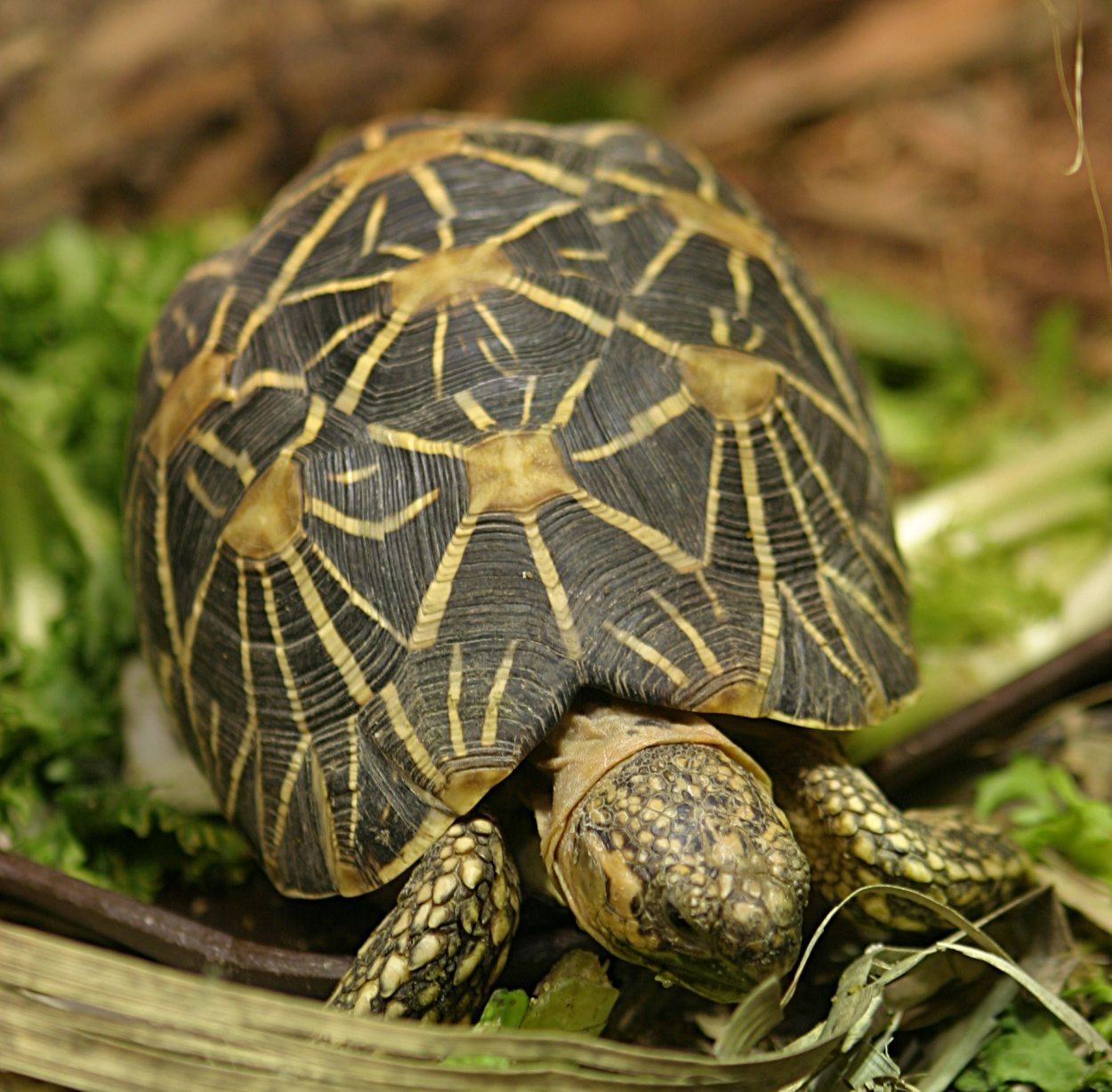
Indian star tortoise

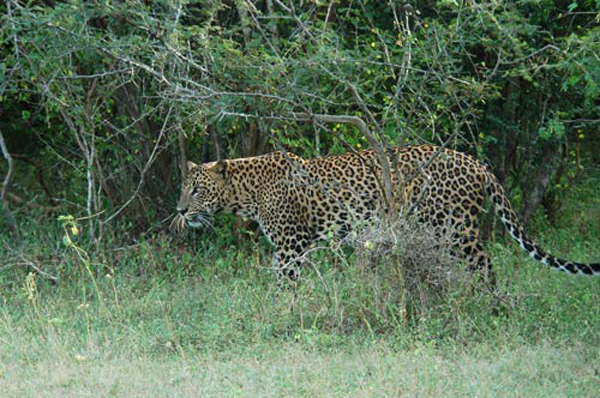
Sri Lanka leopard

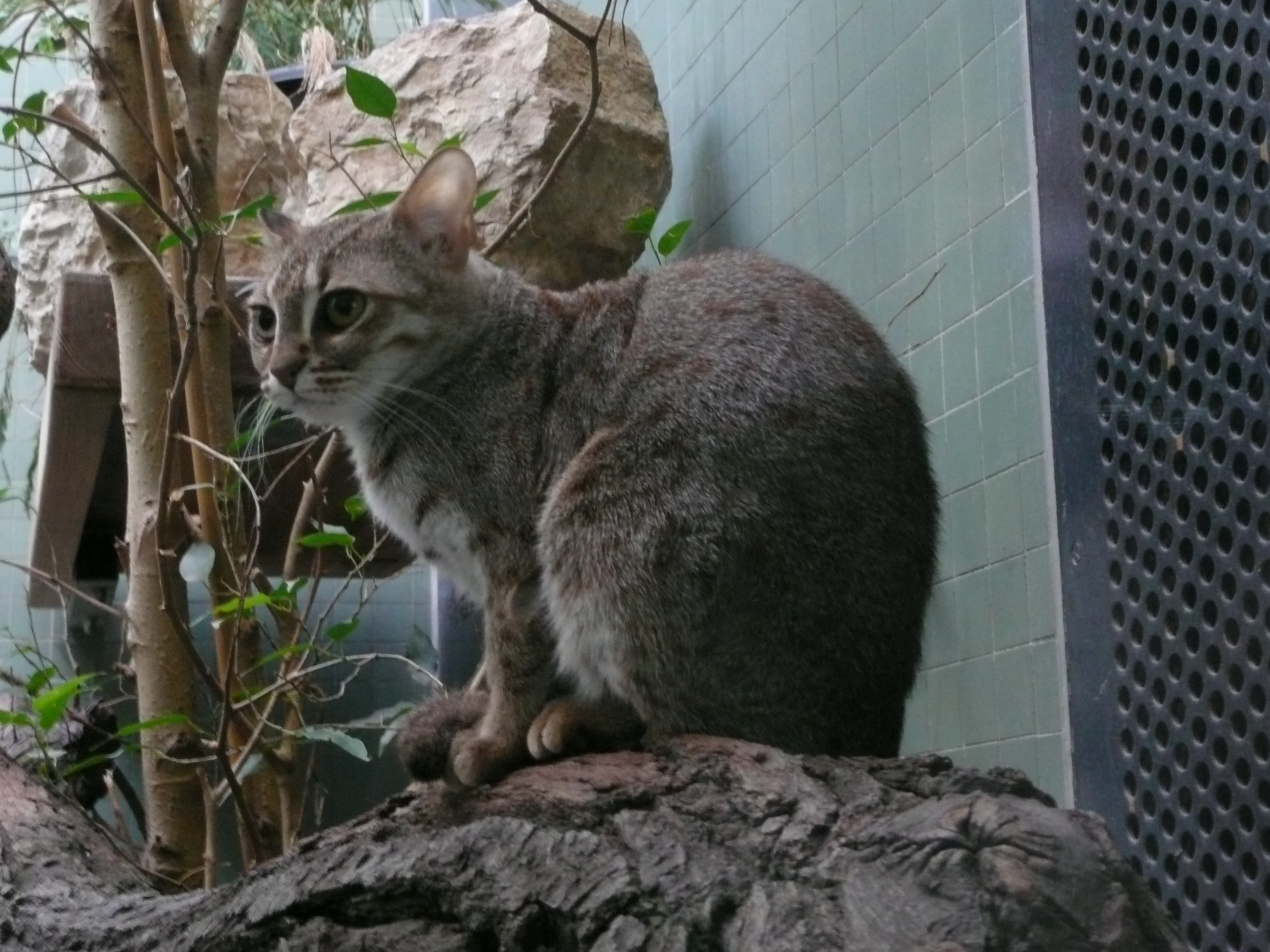
Rusty-spotted cat

== See also ==
- Protected areas of Sri Lanka
