= Flood Plains National Park =

National park in Sri Lanka

- ජලගැලුම් නිම්න ජාතික වනෝද්‍යානය வெள்ளச் சமவெளிகள் தேசிய வனம்
- IUCN category II (national park)
- Location within Sri Lanka
- Location: North Central Province, Sri Lanka
- Nearest city: Polonnaruwa
- Coordinates: 7.91813°N 81.08665°E
- Area: 17,350 hectares (67.0 mi^{2})
- Established: 1984
- Governing body: Department of Wildlife Conservation

Flood Plains National Park (Sinhala: ජලගැලුම් නිම්න ජාතික වනෝද්‍යානය, romanized: Jalagælum Nimna Jātika Vanōdyānaya; Tamil: வெள்ளச் சமவெளிகள் தேசிய வனம், romanized: Veḷḷac Camaveḷikaḷ Tēciya Vaṉam) is one of the four national parks set aside under the Mahaweli River development project in Sri Lanka. The park was created on 7 August 1984. The national park is situated along the Mahaweli flood plain and is considered a rich feeding ground for elephants. Flood Plains National Park is considered an elephant corridor for the elephants migrate between Wasgamuwa and Somawathiya national parks. The park is situated 222 kilometres (138 mi) north-east of Colombo.

== Physical features ==
The park's elevation range from 20–60 metres (66–197 ft) with sparse rock outcrop. The Mahaweli River flows from south to north through the centre of the park. The rich alluvial soil flood plains situated beside the river are featured by a number of shallow swampy depressions called "villus". Around 38 villus have been recorded from the floodplains. The villus system of Mahaweli River has received protected status from Flood Plains and Somawathiya National Parks. The extended inundation of these low-lying areas, along with the nutrients carried in by the water, are the cause of the high level of net primary productivity. Furthermore, to being flooded in the wet season, the villus are also inundated during the dry season because the headwaters of the Mahaweli River experience the south-west monsoon at that time. Unto the recent diversion of the river for irrigational purposes, the villus were important as dry season grazing grounds. The park is situated in the dry zone, therefore there is only a north-east monsoon from October to late-January and the wet season is followed up by a dry lasting from March to September. Mean temperature is around 27 °C (81 °F) and mean rainfall is around 1,650 millimetres (65 in). Relative humidity range from 60 to 90% depending on the rainfall patterns and the area experience strong seasonal windy periods.

== History ==
Mahaweli River in this section was connected to the nearby ancient irrigation network. On the right bank of the river, at the edge of the Mutugalla villu, ruins of an ancient cave monastery with inscriptions dating back to between 2nd and 7th century BC have been found. Flood Plains National Park which declared in 1984 is in the upper flood plains of Mahaweli River and Somawathiya National Park declared in 1986 is situated in the downstream. These two parks, along with Wasgamuwa National Park to the southwest and the Trikonamadu Nature Reserve to the northeast forms a system of contiguous protected areas. It has been proposed to link all these national parks together to form a single protected area.

== Flora ==
The floodplains of the Mahaweli forest are made up of diverse ecological zones consisting of river channels, riverine marshes, villus, seasonally flooded grasslands, and swamp forests. The flood plain in general and associated villus in particular have a high diversity of both smaller and larger plant species. There are 231 plant species that have recorded from Handapan and Bendiya villus and marsh forests, which is the largest villu of 796 hectares (3.07 sq mi) within the Mahaweli River floodplain. Saturated soil and flooding hinder tree growth and enhance the growth of water-tolerant grasses and aquatic plants. The vegetation of the villus shows distinct pattern of zonation with creeping grasses such as Cynodon dactylon, and essentially terrestrial annual plants on the edges. Hydrophytic plants and grasses further inwards; floating plants such Aponogeton crispum, A. natans, and Nymphoides spp. occur along with Nelumbo nucifera in deeper water, and an association of manel Nymphaea stellata and the submerged floating plants Ceratophyllum demersum in the deepest water. Some floating plants found in the all zones. The original riverine forest on the banks has been completely removed make way for tobacco cultivation. Between the banks the swamps of the villus, the vegetation is similar to swamp forests, due to periodic inundation with trees such as Terminalia arjuna, Hydnocarpus venenata, Mitragyna parvifolia, Madhuca longifolia, and Barringtonia asiatica being the most abundant. Calamus rotang are also common in the area. About 25 plants of a rare herb Pentapetes phoenicea are found at three different sites in the marsh forest. Elsewhere the monsoon forest is found on higher grounds and gallery forest along the river banks.

== Fauna ==
The rich vegetation in the villus attract large numbers of herbivores and aves and supports a higher annual biomass than any other form of habitat within the accelerated Mahaweli development project area. The flood plains are abundant in supply of water and grasslands and therefore is an important habitat for elephant (Elephas maximus). In 2007 the estimated elephant population of the park was around 50–100. Other frequently seen mammals are fishing cat felis viverrinus, jungle cat Felis chaus, rusty-spotted cat felis rubiginosa, jackal Canis aureus, wild boar Sus scrofa, Indian muntjac Muntiacus muntjak, sambar Cervix unicolor, spotted deer C. axis, and water buffalo Bubalus bubalis. European otter Lutra lutra, Sri Lankan spotted chevrotain Moschiola meminna, and leopard Panthera pardus are also have been recorded from the park. Flood Plains National Park is one of the recorded habitats of grey slender loris Loris lydekkerianus.

The flood plains are especially important for the diversity and richness of their avifauna, particularly migrant birds. The rare species lesser adjutant Leptoptilos javanicus and variety of other species inhabit the floodplains. It has been estimated that around 75 species winter in the swamps of the flood plains. Frequently seen residents are marsh sandpiper Tringa stagnatilis, wood sandpiper T. glareola, Asiatic golden plover Pluvialis dominica, garganey Anas querquedula, osprey Pandion haliaetus, and black-tailed godwit Limosa limosa. Common residents are eastern large egret Egreta alba, cattle egret Bubulcus ibis, Painted stork Ibis leucocephala, pond heron Ardeola grayii, eastern grey heron Ardea cinerea, pheasant-tailed jacana Hydrophasianus chirurgus, purple coot Porphyrio porphyrio, Indian darter Anhinga rufa, little cormorant Phalacrocorax niger, Indian shag P. fuscicollis, Indian cormorant P. carbo sinensis, brahminy kite Haliastur indus, painted snipe Rostratula benghalensis, black-winged stilt Himantopus himantopus, and red-wattled lapwing Vanellus indicus.

The freshwater fish are dominated by exotic species (i.e. Oreochromis spp., Osphronemus goramy) and also endemic species such as Esomus thermoicos, Garra ceylonensis, Schistura notostigma also have been recorded from the park. Important fish species of the villus are climbing perch Anabas testudineus, snakeheads Ophiocephalus stratus and O. parulius, Labeo sp., branded etroplus Etroplus suratensis, butter catfish Ompok bimaculatus and the introduced tilapia Tilapia mossambica. The marshy habitat harbors a large population of reptiles including natricine watersnakes, mugger crocodile Crocodylus palustris, and estuarine crocodile Crocodylus porosus. Indian black turtle Melanochelys trijuga and Indian flap-shelled turtle Lissemys punctata are the other aquatic reptiles reported.

== Conservation ==
The park is especially important for the long-term survival of elephants within the Mahaweli catchment. Together with adjoining Somawathiya National Park, Flood Plains provides a sanctuary for a wide variety of resident and migratory waterfowls. Although there is an overall systems plan for protected areas within the Mahaweli region, there is no management plan particularly for Flood Plains National Park. For management purposes, the northern half of the park is treated as part of Somawathiya National Park and the southern half as part of Wasgamuwa National Park. The construction of dam on the Mahaweli River will inevitably drop water flow and thereby reduce the magnitude and duration of flooding downstream. This drastic change in the water management of the villus will change the rich grasslands into poor quality grazing grounds, which in turn will be harmful to the wildlife. The park was added 1989 IUCN/CNNPA register of threatened protected areas of the world, for its integrity being threatened greatly by overexploitation of its resources. Elephants have fallen into the holes created by the hundreds of kilns and died. Harmful activities were due to be phased out or control strictly to enable to recover. Effective management has been hampered political and security problems in the region. The drying up of villus has facilitated the spread of invasive alien species such as Eichhornia crassipes, Xanthium indicum, Salvinia molesta, which has affected the native grasses and other aquatic plants, resulting in native herbivores' food loss.

== See also ==
- Protected areas of Sri Lanka
