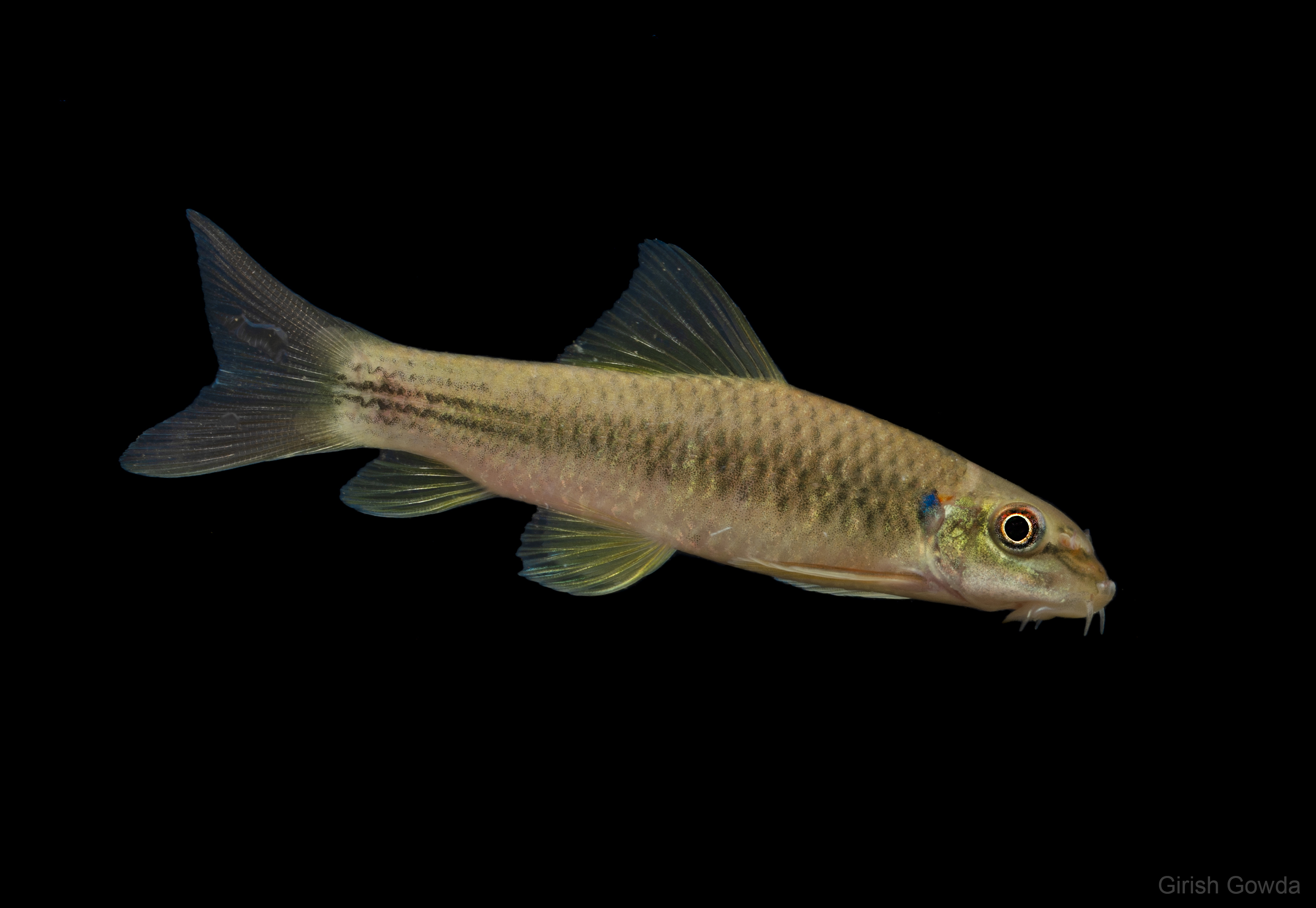

Conservation status
- Least Concern (IUCN 3.1)

Scientific classification
- Kingdom: Animalia
- Phylum: Chordata
- Class: Actinopterygii
- Order: Cypriniformes
- Family: Cyprinidae
- Subfamily: Labeoninae
- Genus: Garra
- Species: G. mullya

Binomial name
- Garra mullya (Sykes, 1839)

Synonyms
- Chondrostoma mullya; Discognathus fusiformis; Garra alta; Garra jenkinsonianum; Garra malabarica

= Garra mullya =

Species of fish

The mullya garra (Garra mullya) or sucker fish is a species of ray-finned fish in the genus Garra. It is found in streams and rivers throughout India except for Assam and the Himalayas. Reports of the species from Nepal have not been verified.

== Taxonomy ==
A 2021 study found G. mullya to be the sister species to the stone sucker (G. ceylonensis) from Sri Lanka, with the ancestor of G. ceylonensis originating in India and colonizing Sri Lanka during the late Pliocene. The study also found G. mullya to comprise two genetically distinct parapatric Clades, which may represent two distinct species.

== Distribution ==
The species is found in many river basins throughout peninsular India, including the Tapti, Narmada, Mahanadi, Godavari, Krishna, and Kaveri river systems. It is found in mountain streams and lowland rivers, and seems to be rather resistant to pollution, as it has been abundantly recorded from polluted rivers such as the Bhadra River and the Mula-Mutha rivers. However, it is apparently sensitive to endosulfan, as a 2011 survey found it to have disappeared from streams around Kasaragod after endosulfan was sprayed around cashew plantations. It breeds from December to January and migrates upstream for spawning.

== Status ==
The species is not of importance in commercial fisheries, but is caught in large numbers for subsistence fishing and is preferred by many; these fisheries do not seem to threaten the species. There are no reports of widespread threats to the species, and it is thus considered as least concern on the IUCN Red List. However, it has been suggested that more research into its population status, harvest levels, and threats may be essential.
