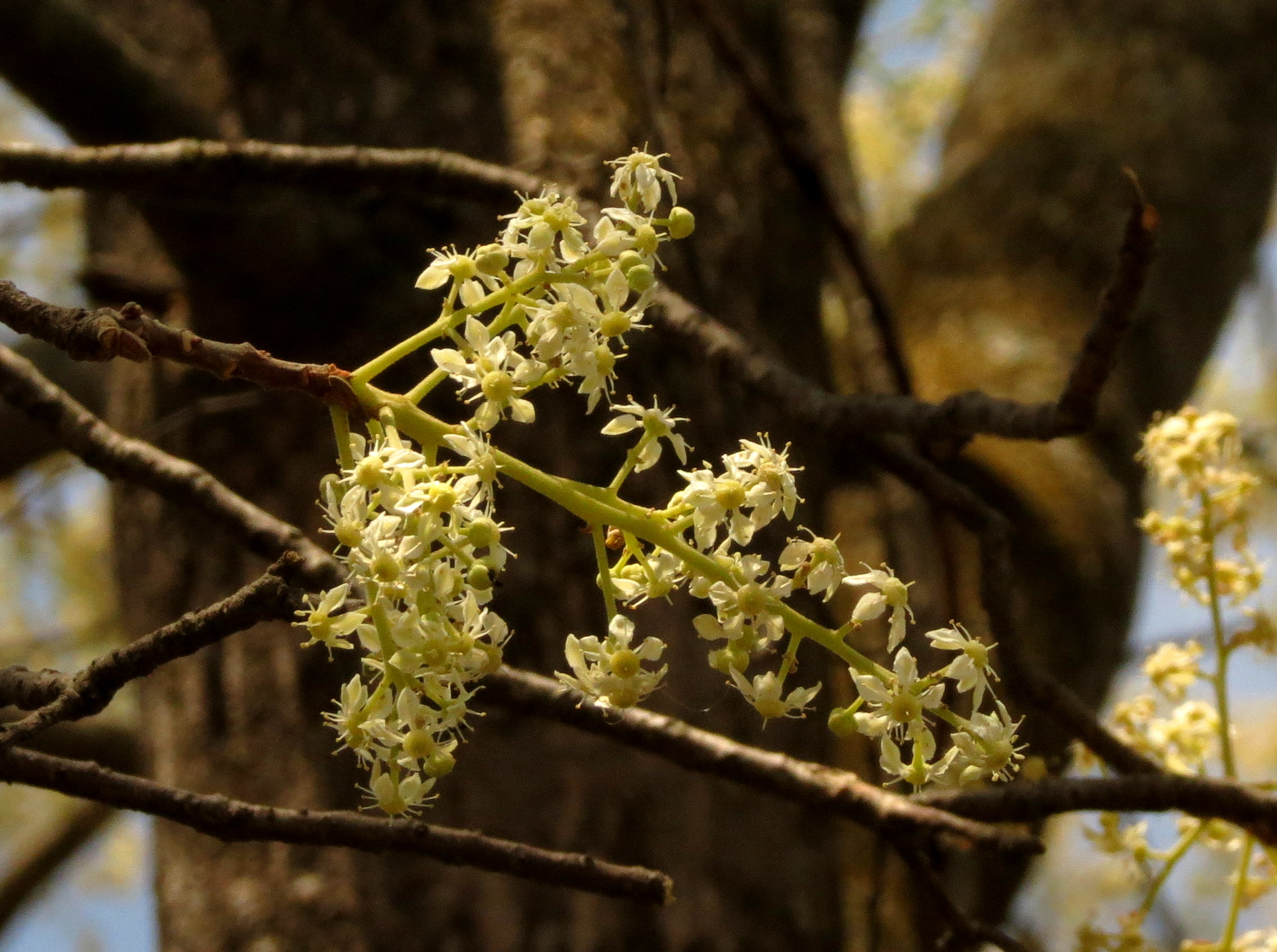
- Chloroxylon swietenia

Scientific classification
- Kingdom: Plantae
- Clade: Tracheophytes
- Clade: Angiosperms
- Clade: Eudicots
- Clade: Rosids
- Order: Sapindales
- Family: Rutaceae
- Subfamily: Rutoideae
- Genus: Chloroxylon; DC.

= Chloroxylon =

Genus of flowering plants

Chloroxylon is a genus of trees in the family Rutaceae. The genus comprises two species, both desired for their wood as high quality tropical timber and heavily exploited.

It has rough and spongy outer bark. Timber is very tough and durable. It has a typical unpleasant smell.

== Species ==
- Chloroxylon swietenia - east Indian satinwood or Sri Lanka satinwood
- Chloroxylon faho - Madagascar satinwood
