= Wasgamuwa National Park =

National park in Sri Lanka

- IUCN category II (national park)
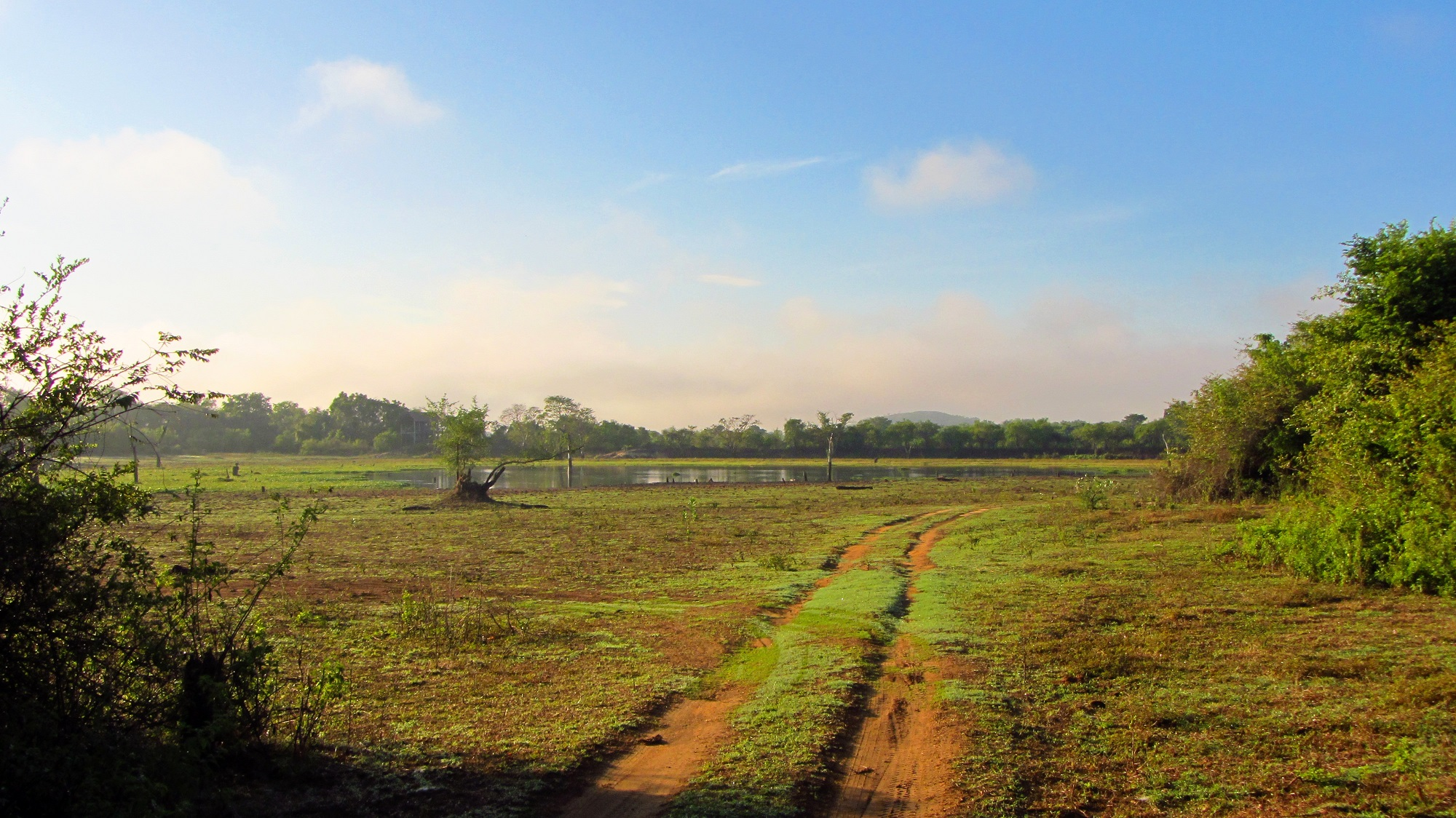
- Wasgamuwa National Park

- Location within Sri Lanka
- Location: Central and North Central provinces, Sri Lanka
- Nearest city: Matale
- Coordinates: 7°43′N 80°56′E
- Area: 39,322 ha (97,170 acres)
- Established: August 07, 1984
- Governing body: Department of Wildlife Conservation

Wasgamuwa National Park is a natural park in Sri Lanka situated in the Matale and Polonnaruwa Districts. It was declared to protect and to make a refuge for the displaced wild animals during the Mahaweli Development Project in 1984 and is one of the four National Parks designated under the Project. Originally it was designated as a nature reserve in 1938, and then in the early 1970s the area was regraded as a strict nature reserve. Wasgamuwa is one of the protected areas where Sri Lankan Elephants can be seen in large herds. It is also one of the Important Bird Areas in Sri Lanka. The name of the Wasgamuwa has derived from the words "Walas Gamuwa". "Walasa" is Sinhala for sloth bear and "Gamuwa" means a wood. The park is situated 225 km away from Colombo.

== Physical features ==
The National Park's annual daily temperature is 28 °C (82 °F) and has a dry zone climate. Annual rainfall ranges between 1650–2100 mm. Rain is received during the northeastern monsoon, from October to January. July–September is the dry season. The highest elevation of the National Park is Sudu Kanda (White Mountain), which is 470 metres (1,540 ft) in height. The soil of the national park contains quartz and marble. The forests of Wasgamuwa represent Sri Lanka dry-zone dry evergreen forests. The park consists of primary, secondary, riverine forests and grasslands.

== History and historic irrigation ==
Ruins of Malagamuwa, Wilmitiya, Dasthota irrigation tanks and Kalinga Yoda Ela canal which are built by Parākramabāhu I remain in the national park. In the past water was irrigated from the Minipe anicut's left bank canal to Parakrama Samudra by Amban Ganga which had run through Wasgamuwa.

Yudangana Pitiya has been identified as the battleground of the battle between King Ellalan and King Dutthagamani taken place. A grassland where the Dutthagamani's army is supposed to have camped before the battle is known as Kandauru Pitiya. The ruins of Chulangani chaitya which was built by King Mahanaga can be seen in the national park. Its circumference, 966 feet (294 m) is greater than the Ruwanwelisaya's. The artifacts that have been recovered from the bricks of the chaitya include a bowl used by King Sri Vikrama Rajasinha and several bronze statues are now kept in the Yudangana vihara.

== Flora ==
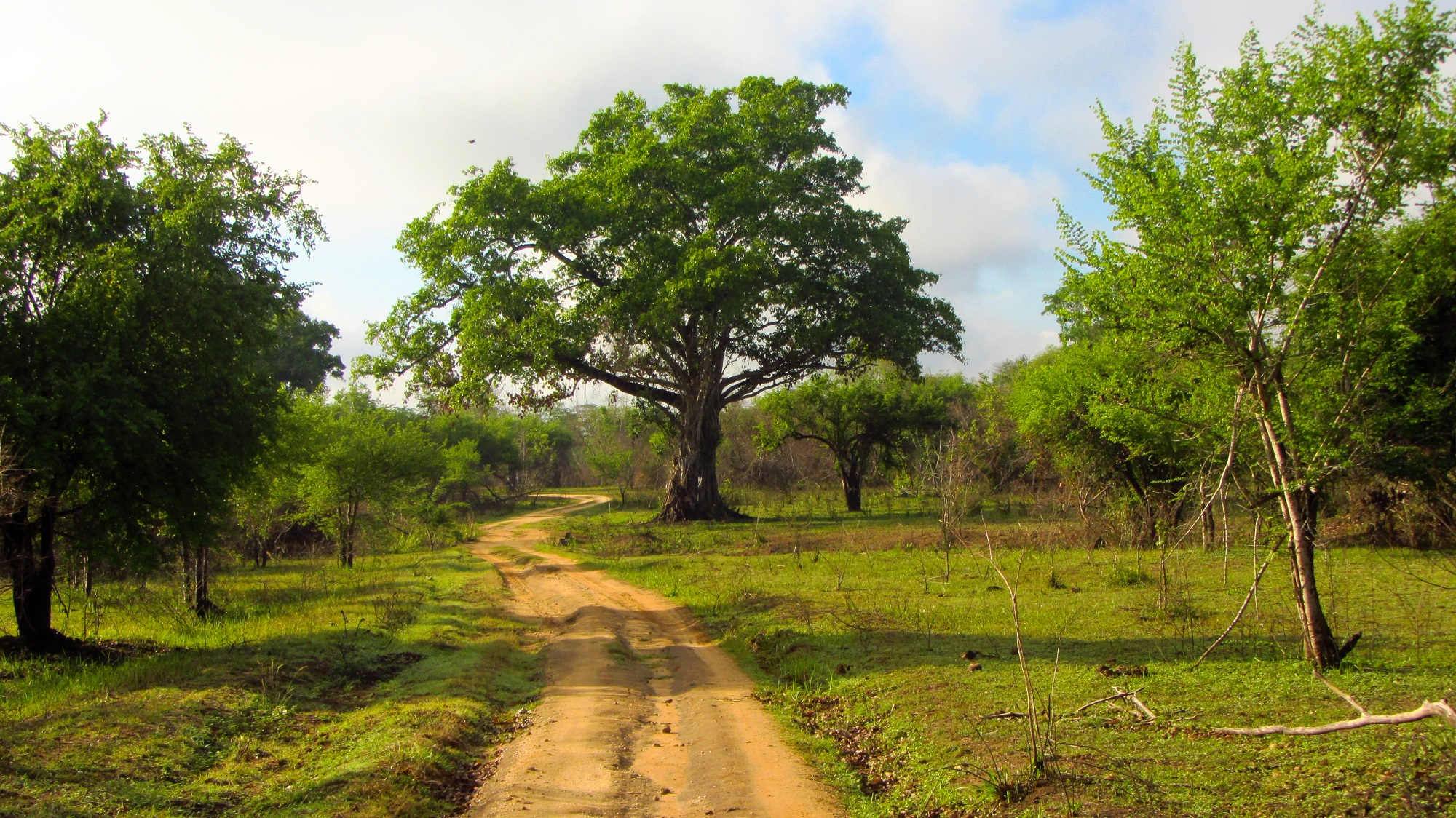
Safari trail at Wasgamuwa.

Wasgamuwa National Park exhibits one of the highest biodiversity among the protected areas in Sri Lanka. More than 150 floral species have been recorded from the park. Cryptocoryne walkeri and Munronia pumila are two plants with economic value. Reservoirs and riverine forests support a large number of fauna species. The forest consists of several layers. Chloroxylon swietenia, Manilkara hexandra, Elaeodendron glaucum, Pterospermum canescens, Diospyros ebenum, Holoptelea intergrifolia, Pleurostylia opposita, Vitex altissima, Drypetes sepiaria, and Berrya cordifolia are dominant trees in the emergent layer. Polyalthia korinti, Diplodiscus verrucosus, Limonia acidissima, Cassia roxburghii and Strobilanthes stenoden are common in other strata. Some 1,700 years old tamarind tree, "Oru Bendi Siyambalawa" (Sinhala for Canoes-Moored-Tamarind) was situated in the park.

== Fauna ==
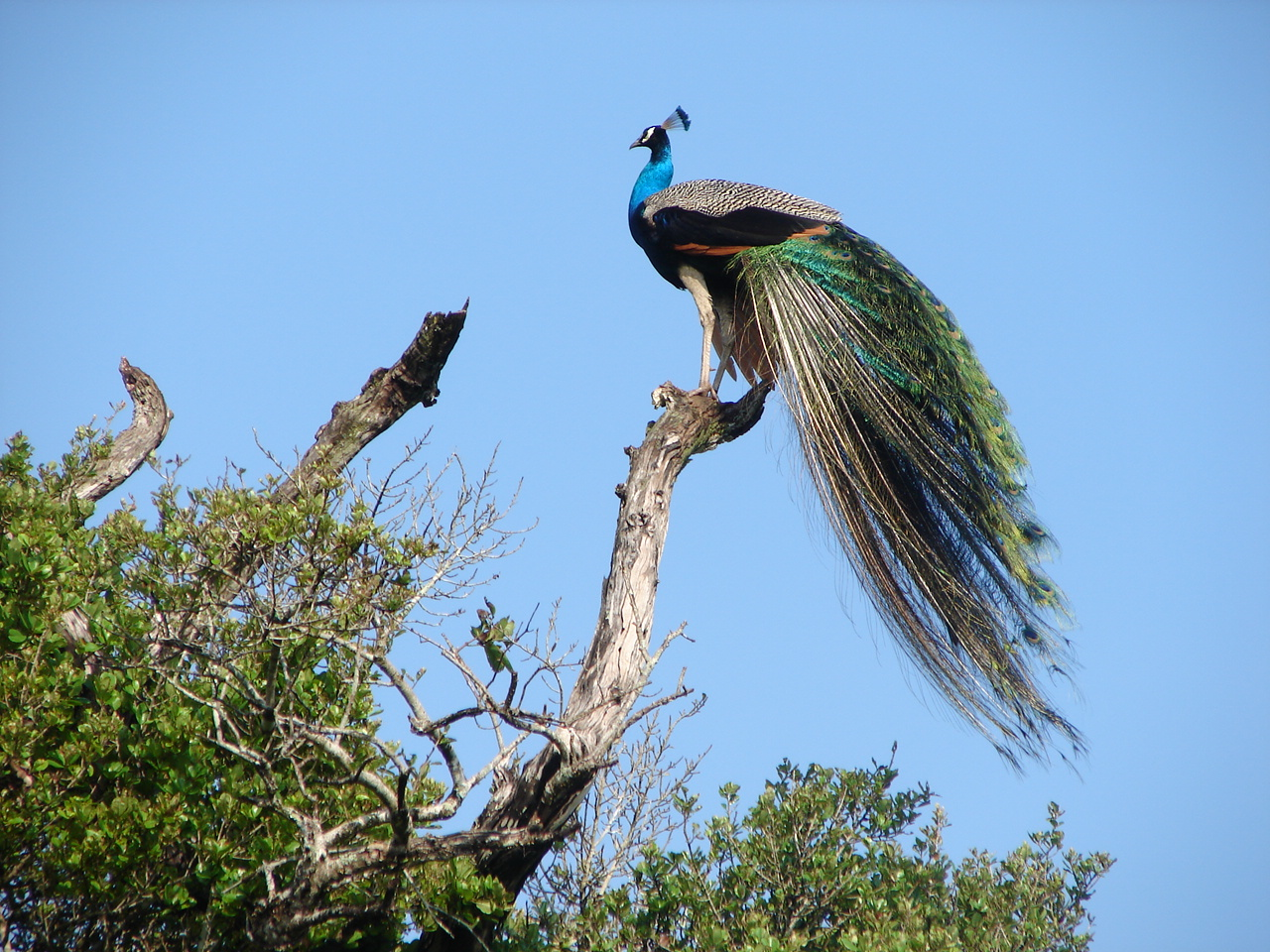
A peafowl enjoying the morning sun

Wasgamuwa National Park is home to 23 species of mammals. The park is inhabited by a herd of 150 Sri Lankan elephants. Marsh elephant (Elephas maximus vil-aliya) roams in the Mahaweli River area. Both monkeys found in the park, purple-faced langur and toque macaque, are endemic to Sri Lanka. While water buffalo and Sri Lankan axis deer are common to observe, Sri Lanka leopard and sloth bear are rare. Small golden palm civet is another rare endemic mammal.

The number of bird species recorded from the park is 143. This includes 8 endemic species. Endemic red-faced malkoha is a resident bird in this national park. Sri Lanka junglefowl is another endemic bird inhabits the park. Lesser adjutant, yellow-fronted barbet, and Sri Lanka spurfowl are the species that visit the reservoirs and streams of the national park. Peafowl, painted stork, black-headed ibis and Eurasian spoonbill are the park's other aquatic birds. Rare Sri Lanka frogmouth can be found here. Another rare species, chestnut-winged cuckoo, is near the Mahaweli River.

Endemic and endangered Fejervarya pulla is one of the eight species of amphibians in the park. Of 17 reptile species recorded in the park, five species are endemic. Water monitor and mugger crocodile are common in the waterbodies of the park. Skinks Lankascincus spp., lizards Calotes ceylonensis and Otocryptis wiegmanni, and serpent Chrysopelea taprobanica are the endangered reptile species. Endemic Garra ceylonensis and combtail are among the 17 fish species that reside in the aquatic habitats of the park. Of the park's 50 butterflies, eight species are endemic.

== Threats and conservation ==
There is a possibility that wild animals might catch diseases by coming into contact with domestic cattle, which are released to the park's grasslands by the villagers. Wild animals have to compete with these cattle as they have occupied the grazing lands and water pools. These cattle also damage the park's electric fence. Illegal logging is a major threat and preventing it has been a difficult issue. Elephants damage the properties of the villagers and fatal attacks on them have been reported from the park. An elephant transit home is being proposed in the Wasgamuwa National Park. Environmentalists raised concern over proposed resettlement of displaced people from the construction of Moragahakanda reservoir. It is suggested that this resulted in escalating the elephant-human clash.

== See also ==
- Protected areas of Sri Lanka
