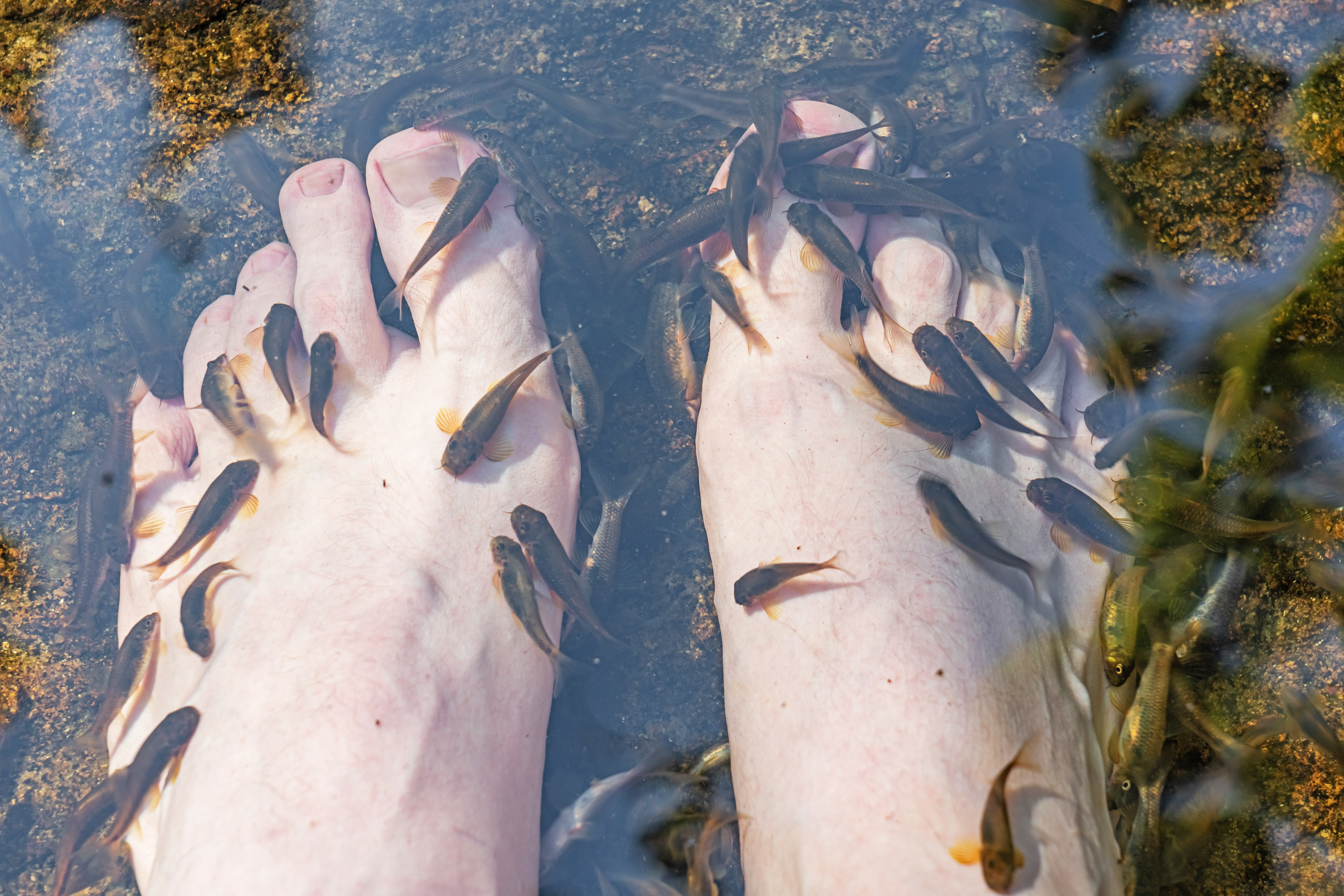

Conservation status
- Near Threatened (IUCN 3.1)

Scientific classification
- Kingdom: Animalia
- Phylum: Chordata
- Class: Actinopterygii
- Order: Cypriniformes
- Family: Cyprinidae
- Subfamily: Labeoninae
- Genus: Garra
- Species: G. ceylonensis

Binomial name
- Garra ceylonensis Bleeker, 1863

= Ceylon logsucker =

Species of fish

Garra ceylonensis (the stone sucker or Ceylon logsucker) is a species of ray-finned fish in the cyprinid family. It is endemic to rivers and streams in Sri Lanka (formerly known as "Ceylon") - and is considered as a schooling fish. It is a rheophilic species and occurs in slow to moderately flowing rivers and streams, and ascends small, rocky streams in order to breed. It primarily feeds on aufwuchs - algae and diatoms.

== Taxonomy ==
A 2021 study found G. ceylonensis to be a sister species to the mullya garra (Garra mullya) from mainland India, which itself may comprise two species. G. ceylonensis comprises primarily six genetically distinct subclades that are each tied to a single river basin, albeit with two exceptions.

== Evolution ==
The ancestor of G. ceylonensis colonized Sri Lanka from India once during the late Pliocene, via a former isthmus that existed in the Palk Strait, and from the Pleistocene until its submergence, the still-exposed isthmus may have had a hydroclimate unsuitable to further dispersal of freshwater fish.

During the Pleistocene, a major aridification event led to the extirpation of many ancestral G. ceylonensis populations, leading it to be restricted to several relict populations. When the climate became more suitable, the species recolonized most of the island, which may have been facilitated by stream capture and the species' free-swimming larvae.

== Status ==
G. ceylonensis is considered near threatened on the IUCN Red List. The species is frequently exploited for the aquarium trade, and there have been major changes to its habitat from deforestation and hydropower projects that block its migration routes.
