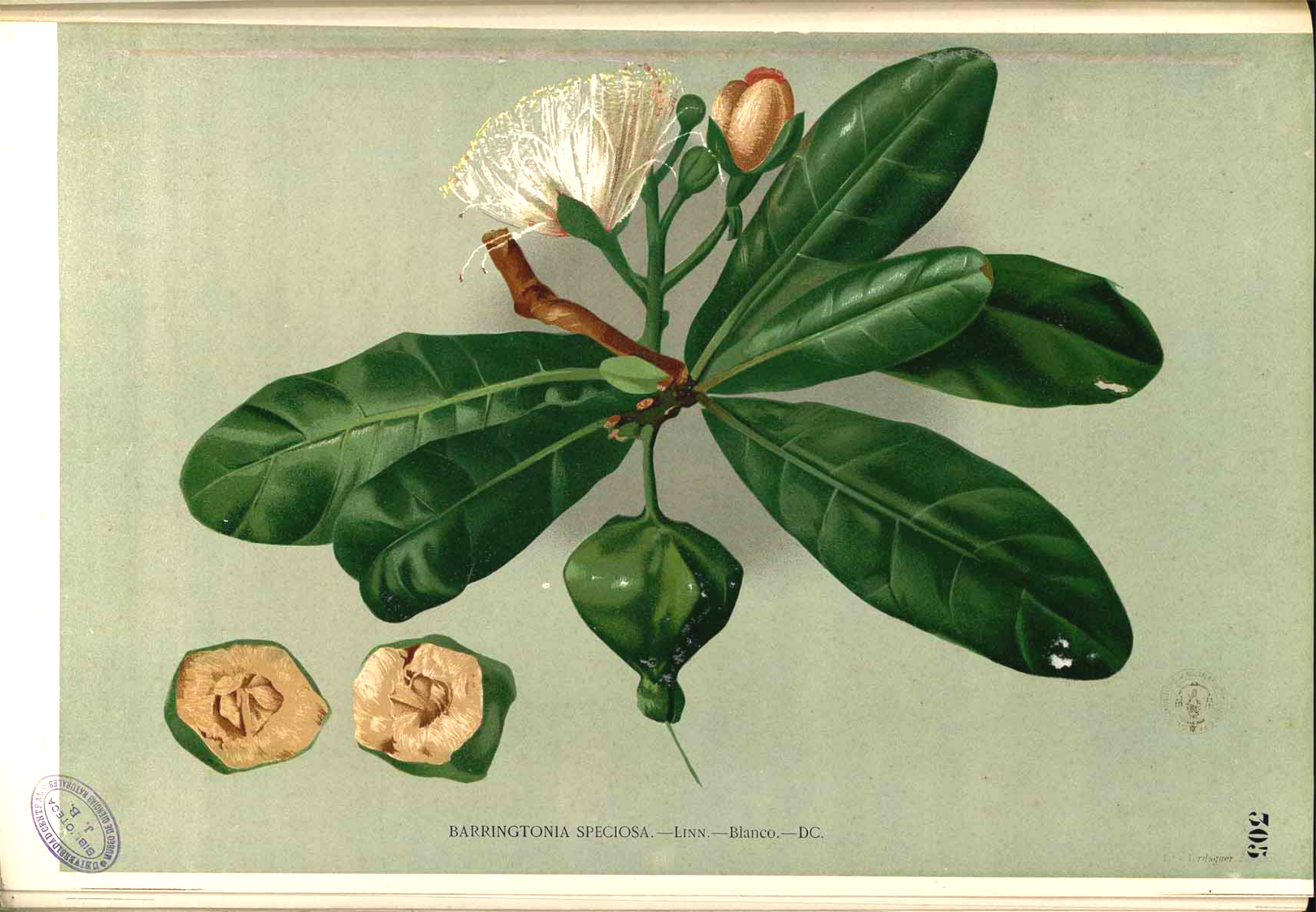
- Illustration from Flora de Filipinas by Francisco Manuel Blanco

Conservation status
- Least Concern (IUCN 3.1)

Scientific classification
- Kingdom: Plantae
- Clade: Tracheophytes
- Clade: Angiosperms
- Clade: Eudicots
- Clade: Asterids
- Order: Ericales
- Family: Lecythidaceae
- Genus: Barringtonia
- Species: B. asiatica

Binomial name
- Barringtonia asiatica (L.) Kurz

Synonyms
- 13 synonyms: Agasta asiatica (L.) Miers; Agasta indica Miers; Agasta splendida Miers; Barringtonia butonica J.R.Forst. & G.Forst.; Barringtonia levequii Jard. nom. nud.; Barringtonia littorea Oken nom. illeg.; Barringtonia senequei Jard.; Barringtonia speciosa J.R.Forst. & G.Forst.; Butonica speciosa (J.R.Forst. & G.Forst.) Lam.; Huttum speciosum (J.R.Forst. & G.Forst.) Britten; Mammea asiatica L.; Michelia asiatica (L.) Kuntze; Mitraria commersonia J.F.Gmel.

= Barringtonia asiatica =

Species of plant

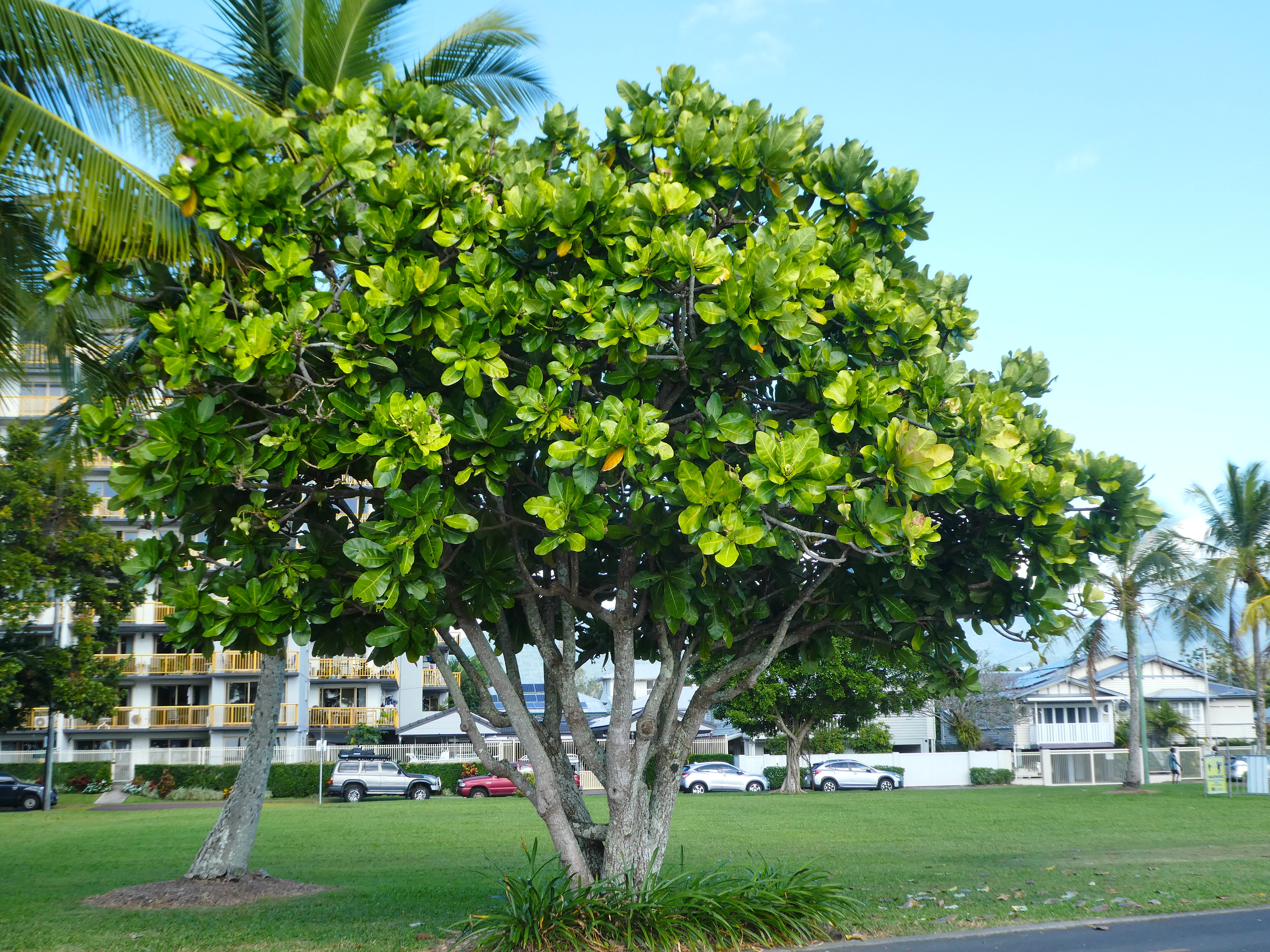
Small tree on the waterfront in Cairns, Queensland

Barringtonia asiatica, known variously as fish poison tree, putat and beach Barringtonia among other names, is a species of plants in the brazil nut family Lecythidaceae. It is native to coastal habitats from Tanzania and Madagascar in the west to tropical Asia, northern Australia, and islands of the western Pacific Ocean. It was described by Wilhelm Sulpiz Kurz in 1875 and has a conservation status of least concern. It has been used by a number of traditional cultures as a fish poison.

== Description ==
This is a tree which will usually grow to a height of about 20 m (66 ft), occasionally to 30 m (98 ft), and a trunk diameter of up to 30 cm (12 in) diameter. The trunk is irregularly shaped and often leaning, the bark is dark and coarse. The leaves are obovate, or pear-shaped, being widest at the tip and narrowest at the base. They are glossy green and somewhat waxy, and may reach up to about 40 cm (16 in) long and 20 cm (7.9 in) wide. The margin is without lobes and the petiole (leaf stalk) is very short or absent.

Flowers are produced in erect racemes at the ends of the branches, each carrying up to 20 flowers. The calyx is completely fused while the bud forms, and splits into two uneven parts when the flower opens. It remains attached even after the fruit has matured. The flowers are large, showy and fragrant, with numerous long stamens which are white at the base and pink/purple at the tip. There are four white petals and the entire flower is about 15 cm (5.9 in) in diameter.

The fruit is large and somewhat pyramid-shaped. In cross section it is more or less square; in longitudinal section it is roughly ovate (heart-shaped) or triangular, with the broadest part at the base attached to the petiole. They measure about 11 cm (4.3 in) long and 9 cm (3.5 in) wide, and they contain one or (rarely) two seeds.

== Taxonomy ==
This species was first described in 1753 as Mammea asiatica by Carl Linnaeus, based on material collected from Java by Pehr Osbeck, a Swedish naturalist and one of Linnaeus' apostles. It was transferred to the genus Barringtonia (which at the time was variously placed in either Myrtaceae, Lecythidaceae or Barringtoniaceae) by the German botanist Wilhelm Sulpiz Kurz in 1875. A number of other botanists have collected specimens of this plant and described them under different names, all of which are now recognised as synonyms (see synonyms list).

=== Etymology ===
The genus name was created to honour the English lawyer, antiquary and naturalist, Daines Barrington, while the species epithet asiatica refers to the region where this species is found.

=== Vernacular names ===
Due to its wide distribution, this species is known by many different names in different regions. In Australia it is called beach Barringtonia, mango pine, mango bark and box fruit. In Malaya and Singapore it is called Putat laut; in Indonesia and Borneo it is known as Butun, Butun alas and other variations; in the Andaman Islands it is referred to as Kyee-bin; it is called bonnet d'évêque (bishop's hat) in New Caledonia; in the Cook Islands it is 'Utu, and may be called hutu, wutu or futu in other Polynesian cultures.

== Distribution and habitat ==
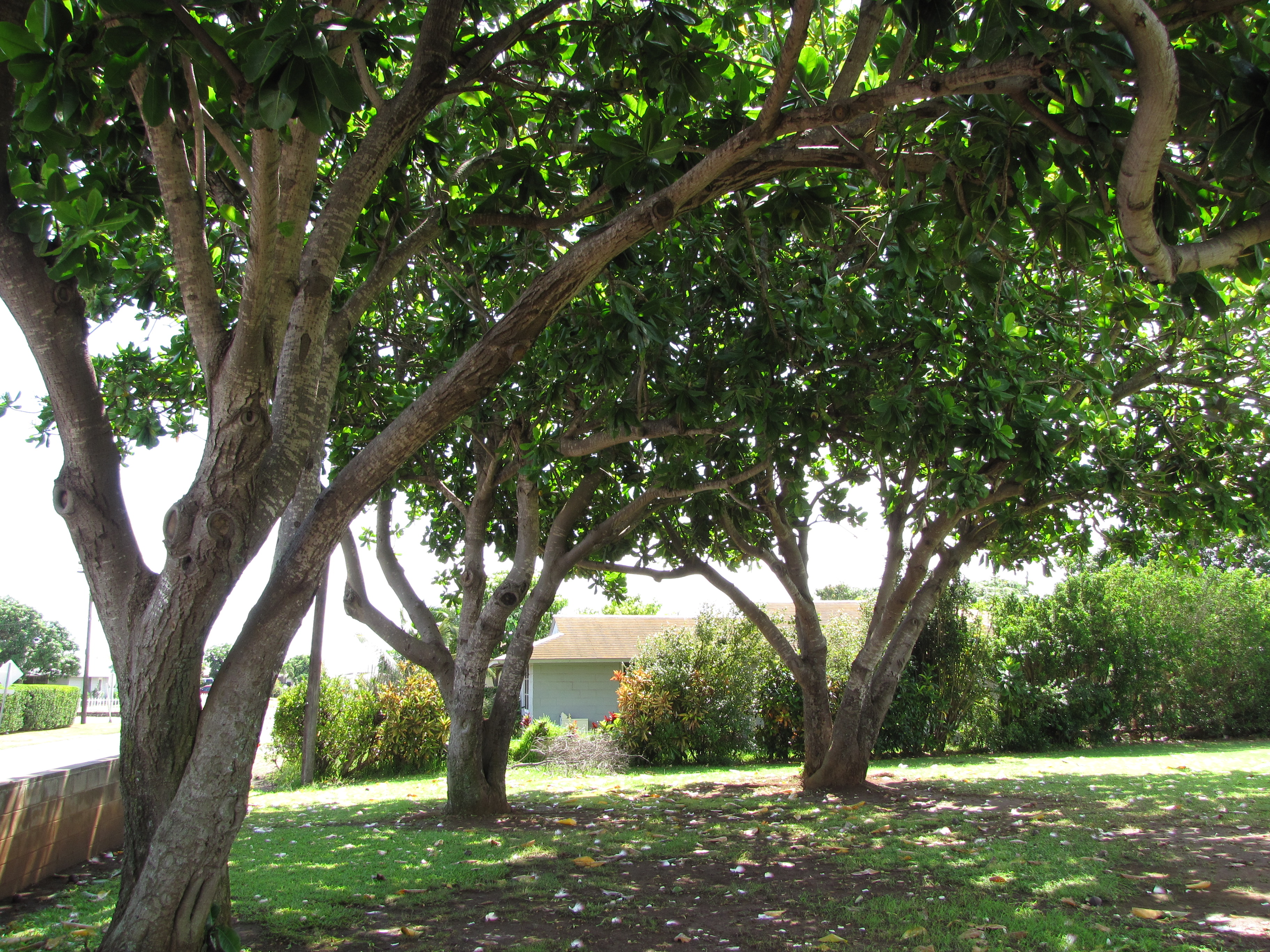
Trunks and habit

Barringtonia asiatica is native to tropical coastlines from Tanzania and Madagascar to India, Southeast Asia, Australia, the Solomon Islands, New Caledonia, Fiji and many other islands of the western Pacific Ocean, and it has been introduced to the Cayman Islands, Cuba, Dominican Republic, Haiti, the Leeward Islands, Puerto Rico, Trinidad-Tobago and the Windward Islands. It inhabits beaches and coastal forests at altitudes up to 100 m (330 ft).

== Conservation ==
The International Union for Conservation of Nature has given this species a conservation rating of least concern globally, however in Singapore it is locally classified as critically endangered.

== Ecology ==
The night-opening flowers of this tree are pollinated by bats and moths. The fruit have a thick spongy layer around the seed, making them very buoyant and allowing them to be dispersed by ocean currents. In testing it has been shown that they can remain afloat for up to fifteen years, although in the ocean most will only survive for up to two years. They have been found on beaches as far away as Ireland and the Netherlands, and it was one of the first plants to colonise the island of Anak Krakatau after the massive eruption in 1883.

== Toxicity ==
The plant is highly toxic to humans.

== Uses ==
Many traditional cultures have used the bark and seeds as a fish poison – they are crushed or pounded to release the saponins contained within, and then placed in slow moving freshwater streams or coral lagoons. The fish are quickly killed or stunned, but the mechanism is not fully understood.

The fruit have been used as floats for fishing nets. The timber is not very hardy and thus has limited use.

The bark, leaves and fruit have been used for medical complaints such as headaches, backaches, sores, and bad dreams.

== Cultivation ==
This tree has ornamental flowers and foliage and provides good shade, and it has been widely planted in tropical parks and gardens. In the city of Cairns, Australia, close to 100 have planted in the streets and parks.

== Gallery ==
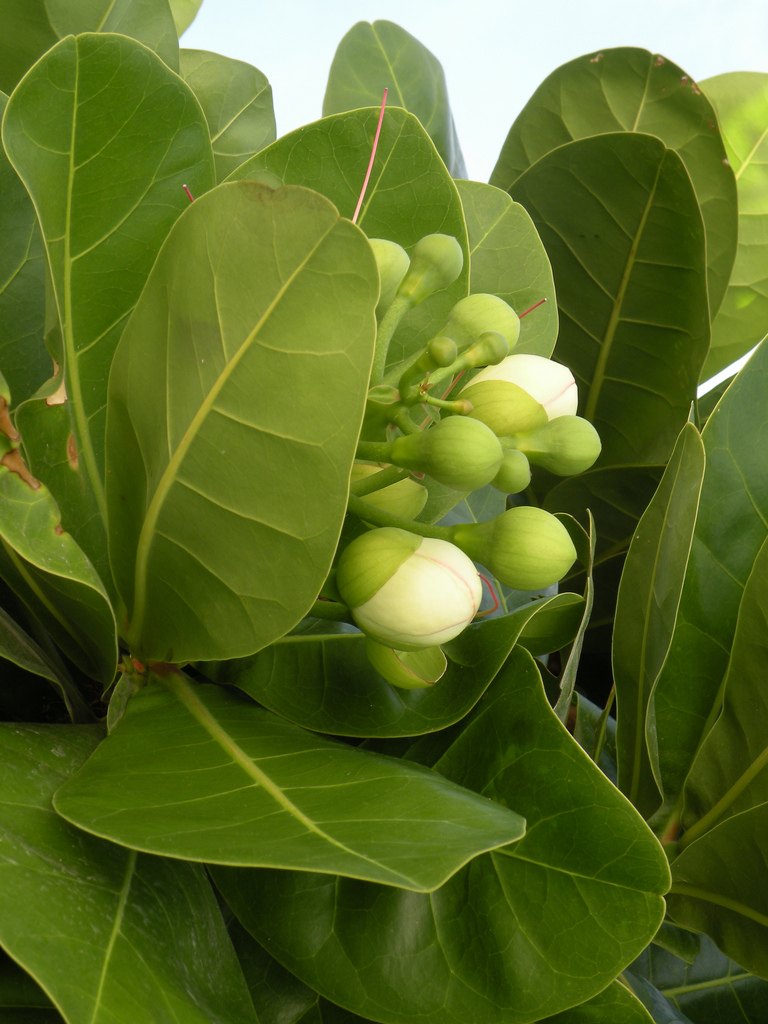
Foliage and flower buds

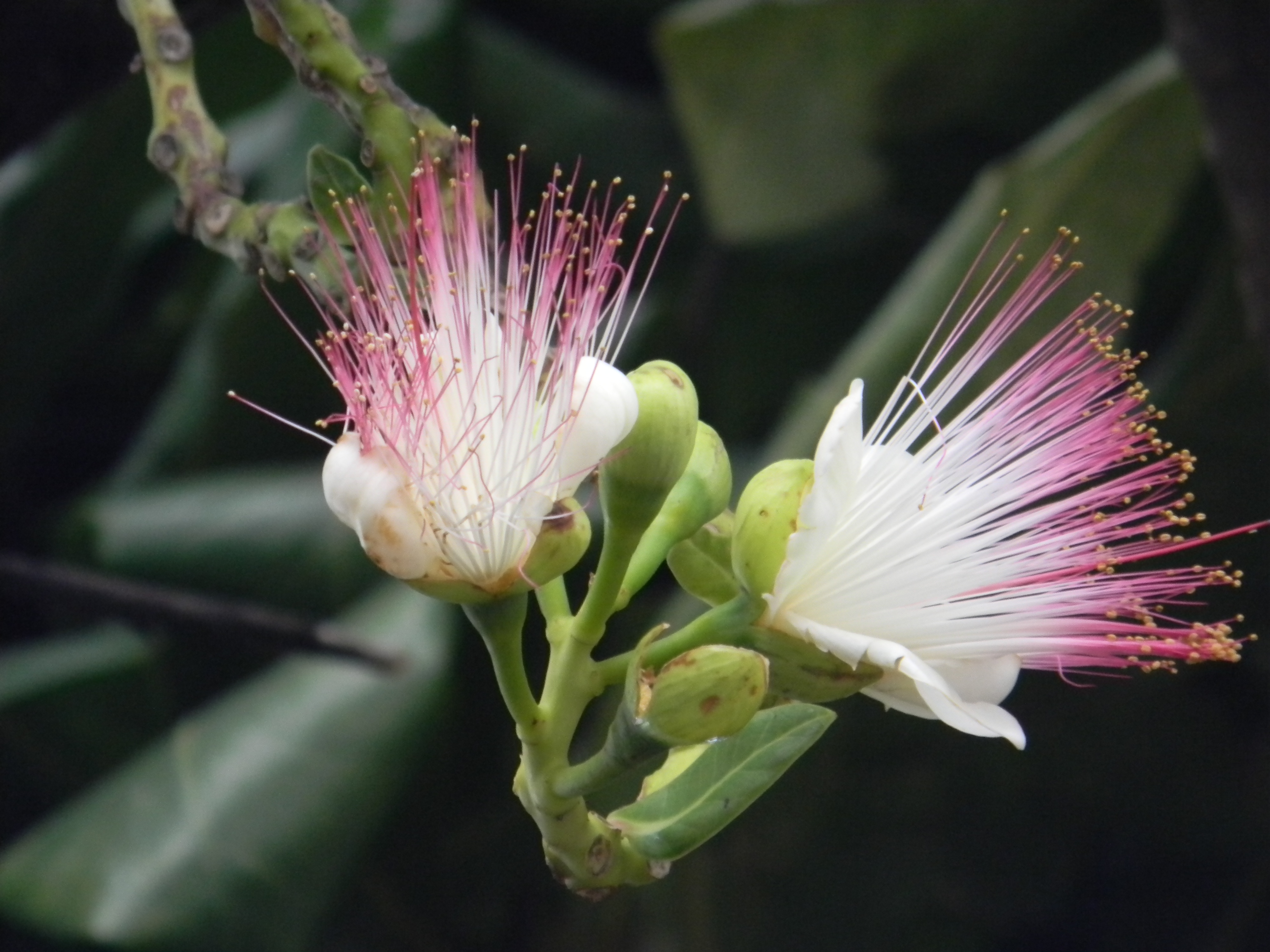
Flowers

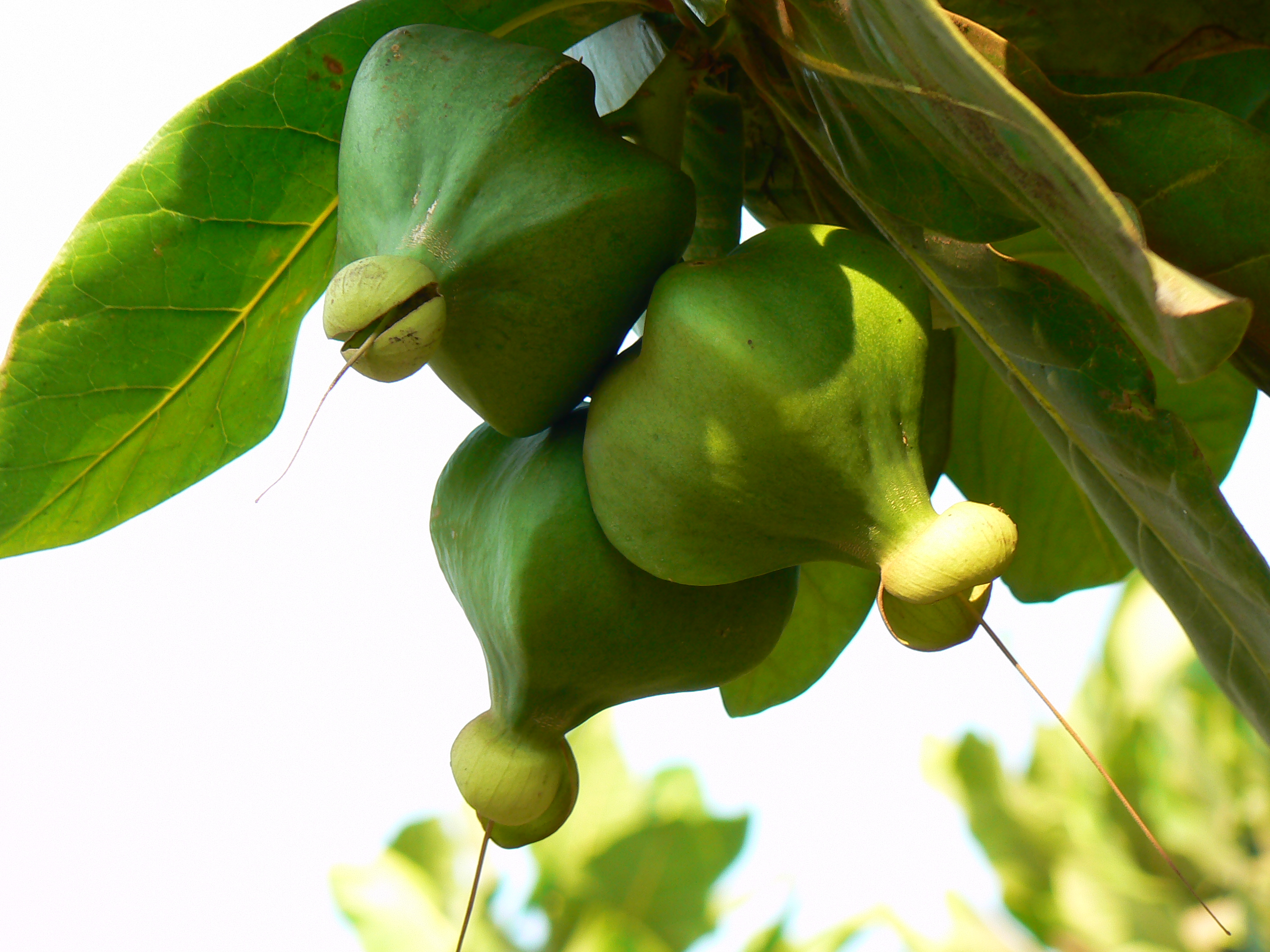
Developing fruit

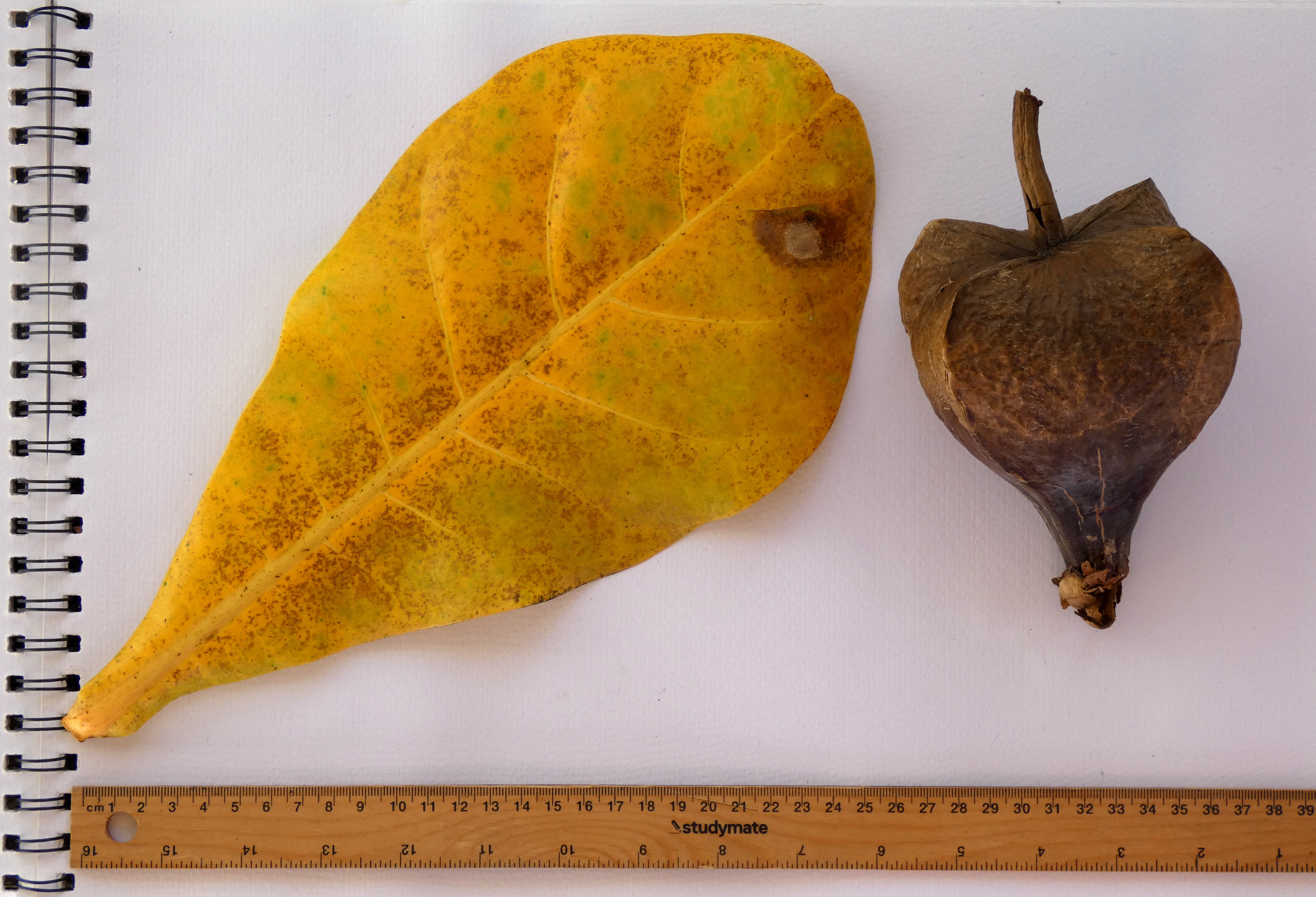
Leaf and fruit

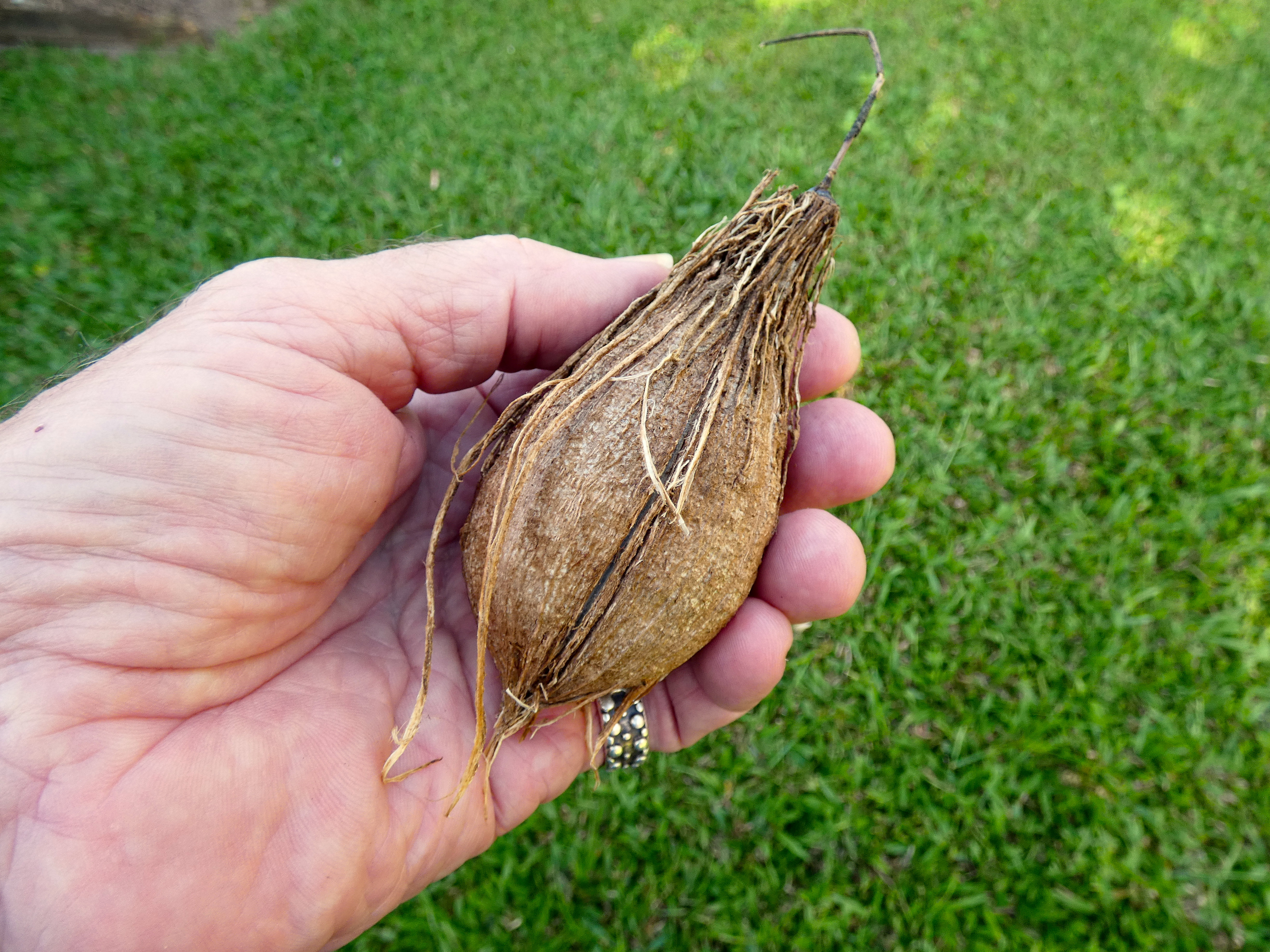
Fresh seed
