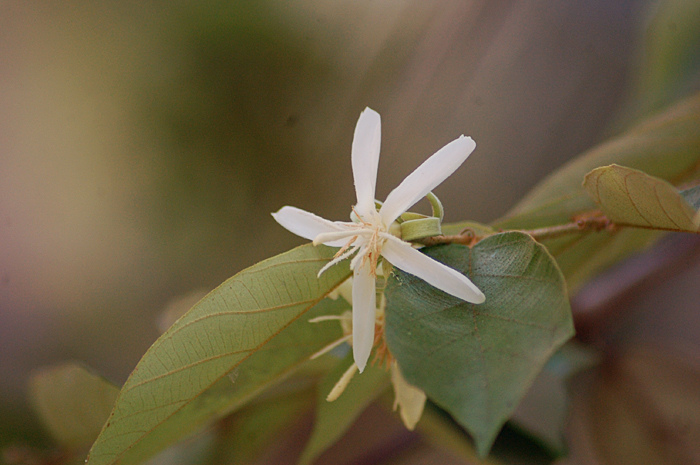

Scientific classification
- Kingdom: Plantae
- Clade: Tracheophytes
- Clade: Angiosperms
- Clade: Eudicots
- Clade: Rosids
- Order: Malvales
- Family: Malvaceae
- Genus: Pterospermum
- Species: P. suberifolium

Binomial name
- Pterospermum suberifolium (L.) Willd.

Synonyms
- Pentapetes suberifolia L; Pterospermum canescens Roxb.

= Pterospermum suberifolium =

Species of flowering plant

Pterospermum suberifolium, or the cork-leaved bayur, is a species of evergreen flowering plant in the family Malvaceae. It is found only in India and Sri Lanka. Leaves are irregularly oblong; subcordate, rounded or oblique; apex acuminate; with irregularly serrated margin. Its flowers are yellowish white and fruit is a capsule.

A famous nagaraja in Buddhism is named for the fruit of the P. suberifolium, mucalinda.

== Medicinal value ==
The plant is used for cure fractured bones in Ayurvedic medicine, where they are grind into a paste with some other medicinal herbs.
