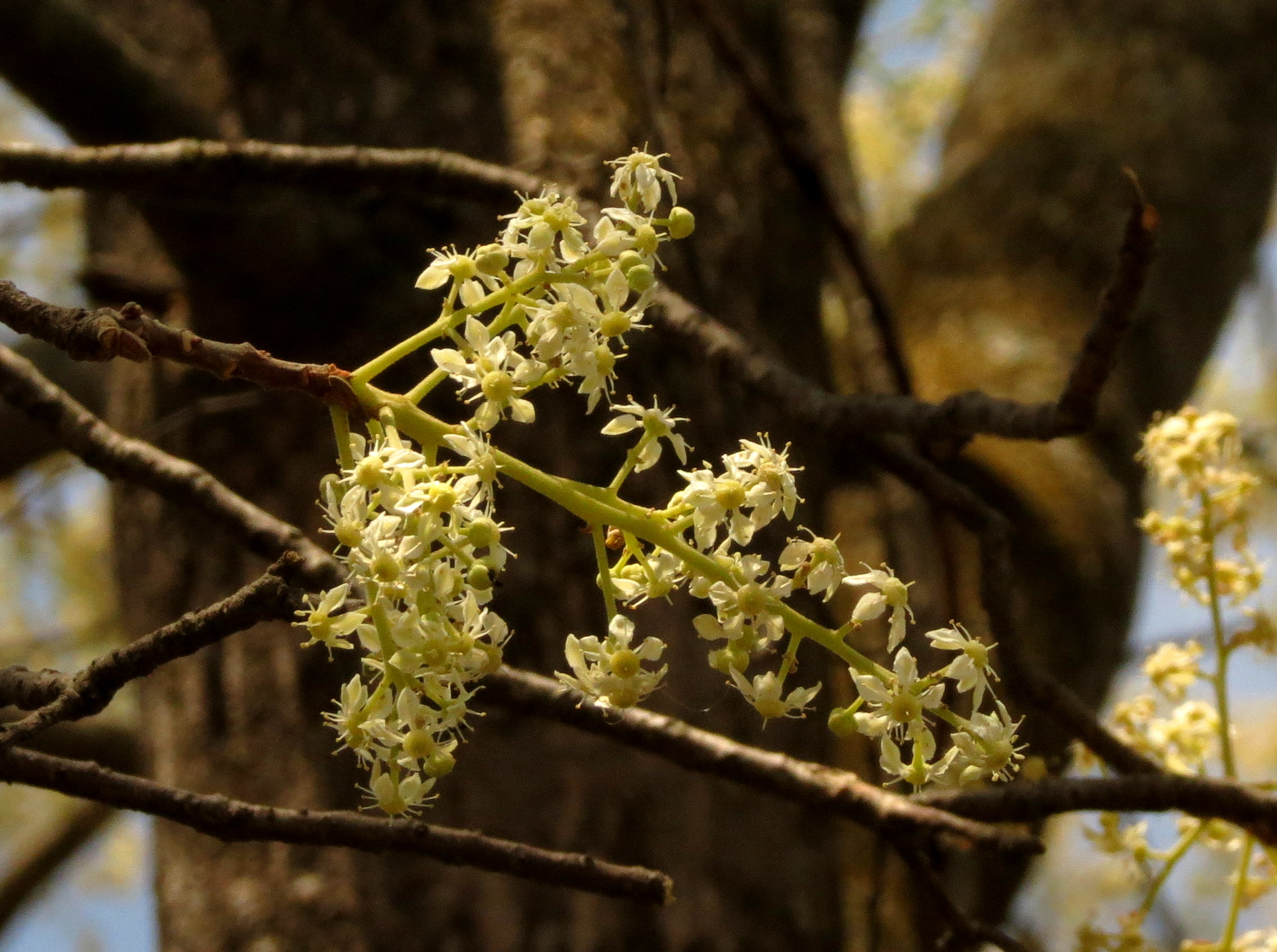
- Ragihalli Forest, Bengaluru district, India.

Conservation status
- Vulnerable (IUCN 2.3)

Scientific classification
- Kingdom: Plantae
- Clade: Tracheophytes
- Clade: Angiosperms
- Clade: Eudicots
- Clade: Rosids
- Order: Sapindales
- Family: Rutaceae
- Genus: Chloroxylon
- Species: C. swietenia

Binomial name
- Chloroxylon swietenia DC.

Synonyms
- Swietenia chloroxylon Roxb.

= Chloroxylon swietenia =

Species of tree

Chloroxylon swietenia, the Ceylon satinwood or East Indian satinwood, is a tropical hardwood, the sole species in the genus Chloroxylon (from the Greek χλωρὸν ξύλον, "green wood"). It is native to southern India, Sri Lanka, and Madagascar.

It and Zanthoxylum flavum, the West Indian satinwood, are considered to be the original satinwoods.

== Wood ==
Its wood is prized for veneers, inlays, fine furniture, and other specialty applications.

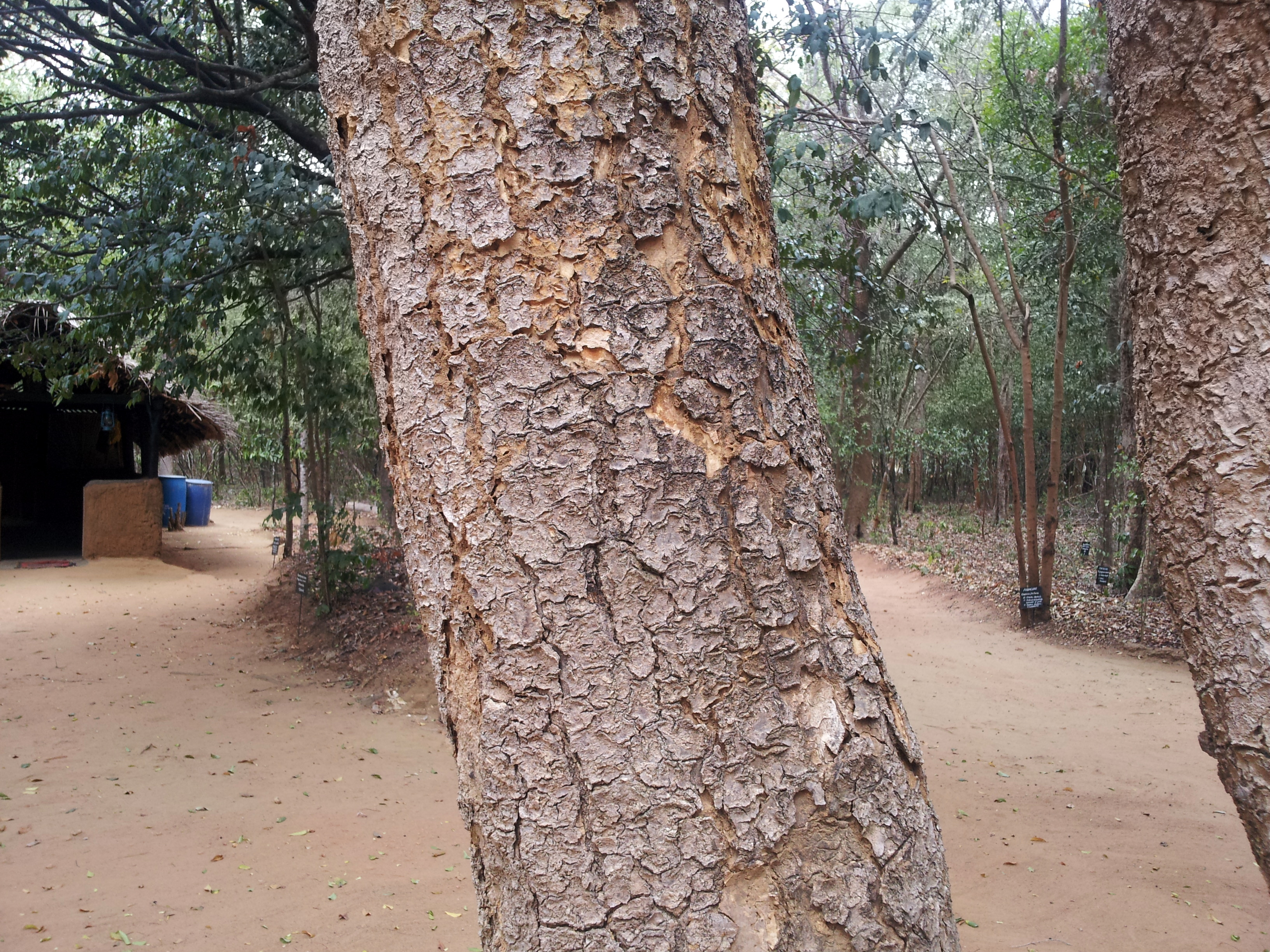
At Pophum's Arbortum, Dambulla

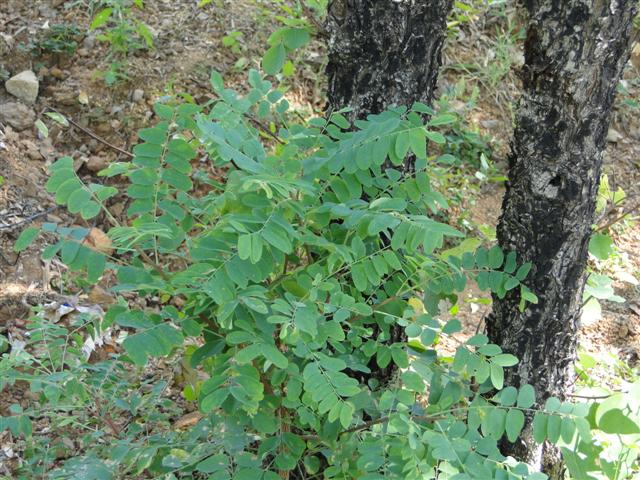
Chloroxylon from India

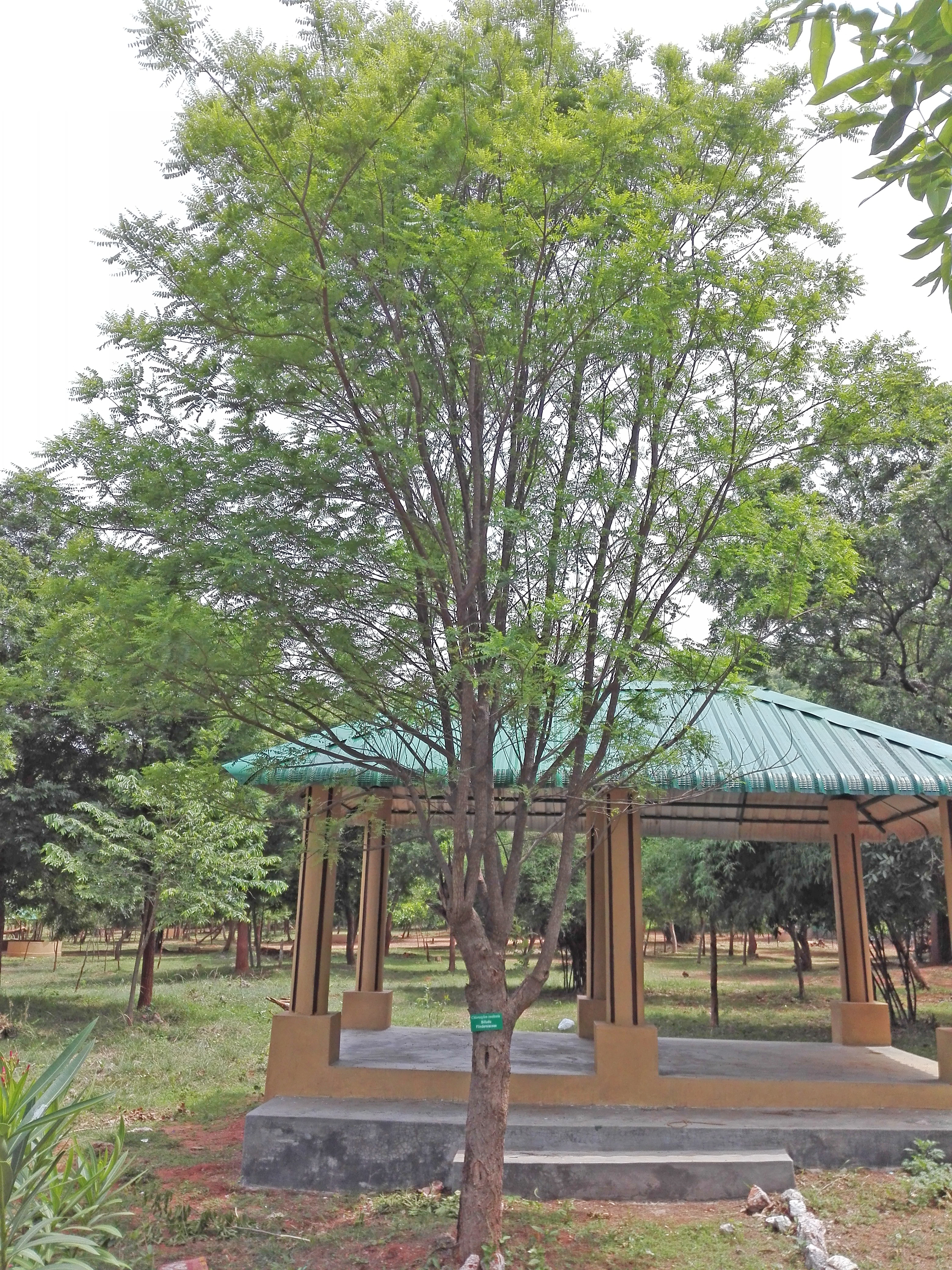
East Indian satinwood (Chloroxylon swietenia) at Visakhapatnam

== Conservation ==
Populations have declined due to overexploitation.
