= Tourism in Sri Lanka =

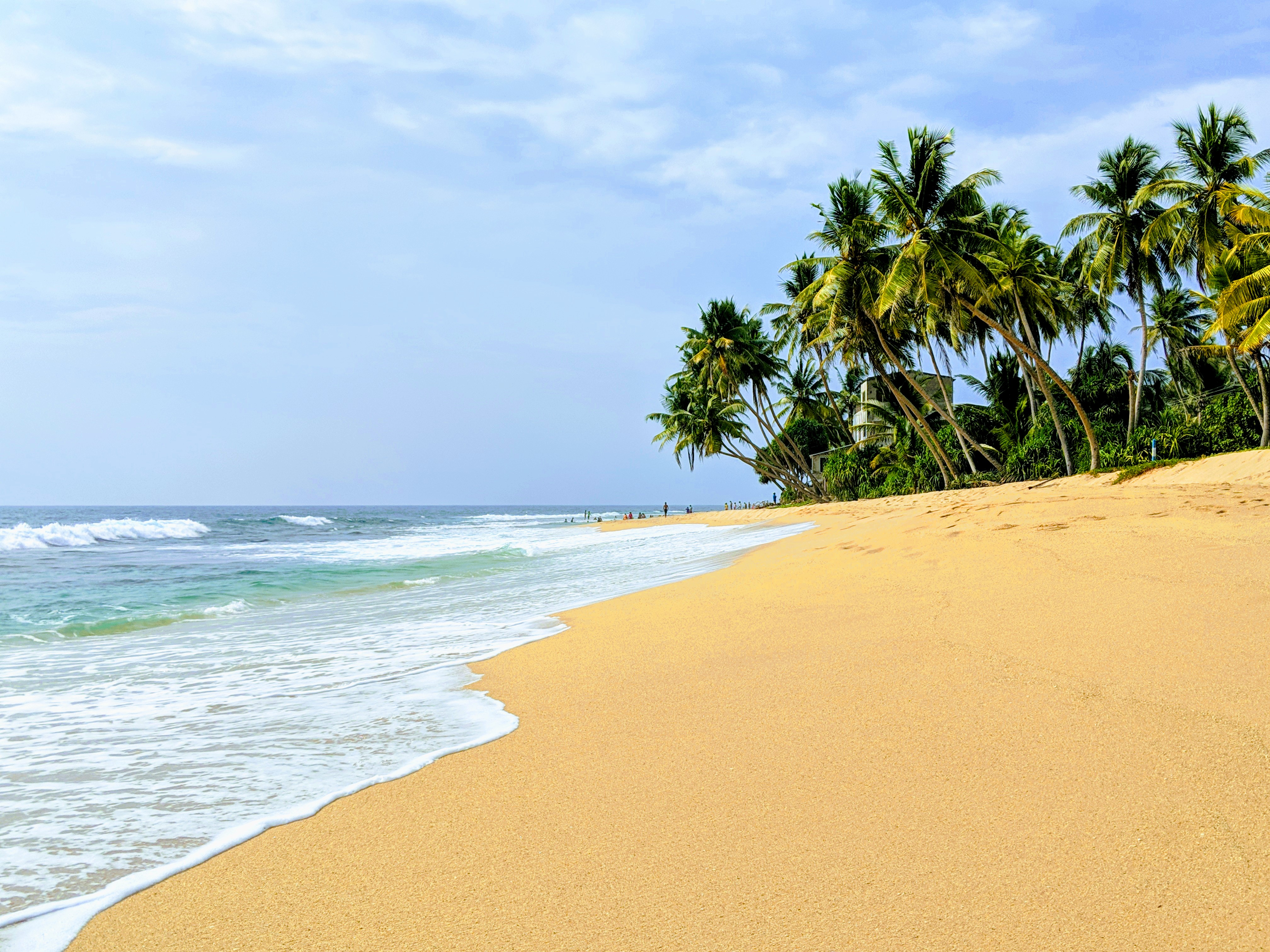
Hikkaduwa beach

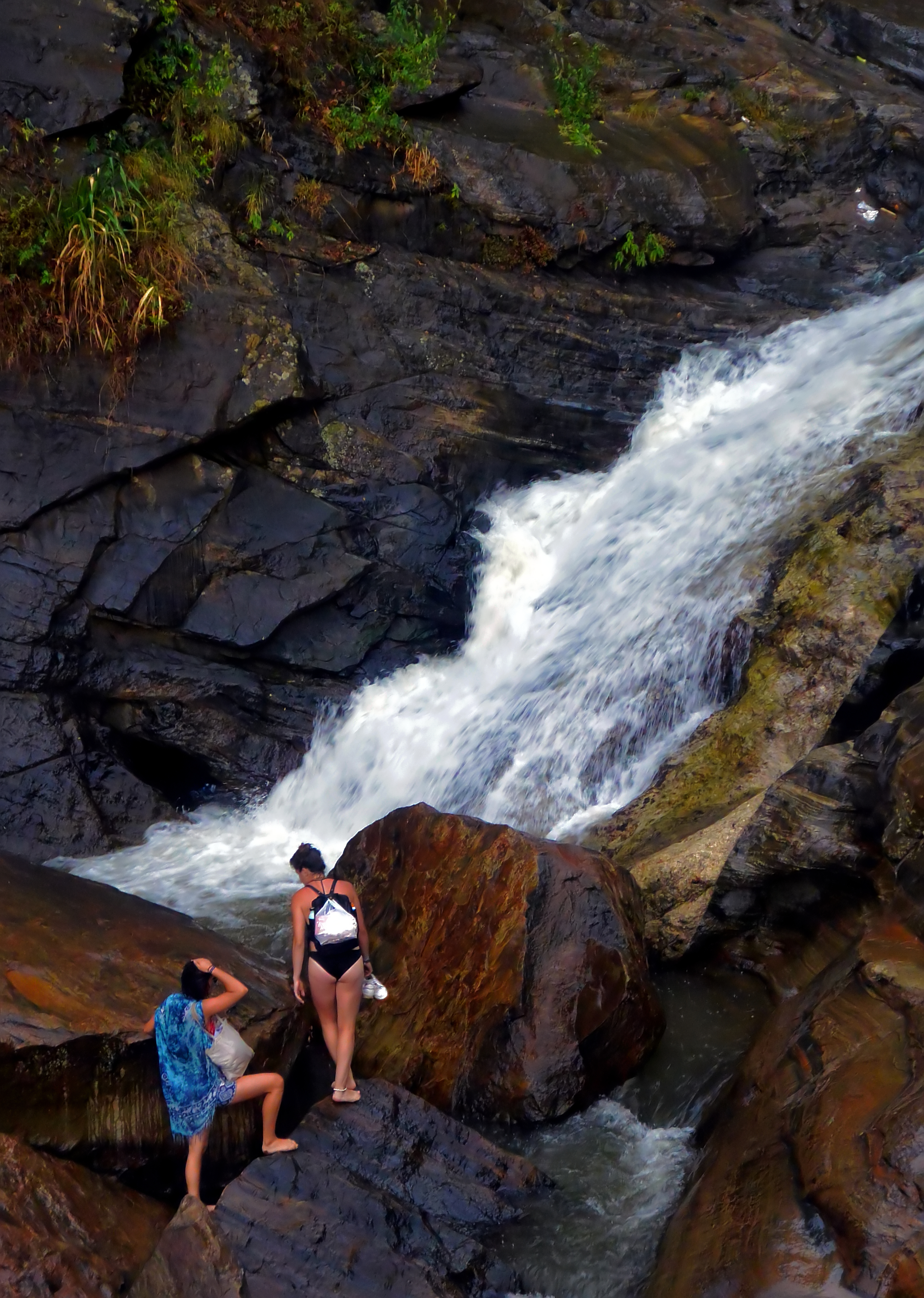
Tourists visiting Ravana Falls

Sri Lanka is a popular tourist destination. Tourism is a key industry that attracts international tourists yearly. Foreigners visit Sri Lanka to see nature, wildlife, historical monuments, and indigenous culture. In 2018, tourist arrivals peaked at 2.33 million, who spent a total of US$5.6 billion in the country. However, the COVID-19 pandemic caused tourist numbers to decrease by 92% in 2020. In 2025, tourism in Sri Lanka returned to its pre-COVID level and surpassing the 2018 figure, with approximately 2.36 million international visitors recorded over the year. The main source countries of tourists were India (531,511 arrivals), the United Kingdom (212,277), Russia (186,580), Germany (147,966), China (132,035), Australia (109,487) and France (109,041). The government is attempting to attract foreign investment in the country's tourism industry, which began in earnest after the end of the Sri Lankan Civil War in 2009.

== Tourist regions ==
The Sri Lanka Tourism Development Authority has classified Sri Lanka into several resort regions suitable for tourism development:

- Colombo and Greater Colombo Resort Region: The Colombo and Greater Colombo Resort Region spreads along the Mount Lavinia in the south to Negombo in the north. Colombo city is the main part of the zone and is the centre for business activities, conferences and sports events in the country. Colombo serves as both a gateway and a stopover point for international tourists.
- South Coast Resort Region: The south coast zone extends from Wadduwa to Tissamaharama. The zone has been divided into two main regions. The first region extends from Wadduwa to Galle. Coastal areas like Kalutara, Beruwala, Bentota, Dedduwa, Madu Ganga, Balapitiya, Ahungalla, and Hikkaduwa are included in this region. The second region, extending from Galle to Tissamaharama, includes Unawatuna, Ahangama, Weligama, Mirissa, Matara, Tangalle and Hambantota areas as sub-points of the zone.
- East Coast Resort Region: The East Coast Resort Region extends from Kuchchaveli in the north to Pottuvil in the south. The main tourism zones in this region are Arugam Bay, Pasikudah, Trincomalee and Nilaveli.
- West Coast Resort Region: The West Coast Resort Region extends along Kalpitiya, Marawila and Waikkala areas.
- High Country Resort Region: Nuwara Eliya, Bandarawela and Maskeliya are included for the High Country Resort Region.
- Ancient Cities Resort Region: This region has five world heritage sites, namely Anuradhapura, Dambulla, Kandy, Polonnaruwa and Sigiriya. Other regions include Habarana, Giritale, Matale and Victoria.
- Other Resort Regions: This includes Yala, Udawalawa, Wasgamuwa, Pinnawala, and Ratnapura, Knuckles Range area.

== History ==
=== Premodern tourism ===
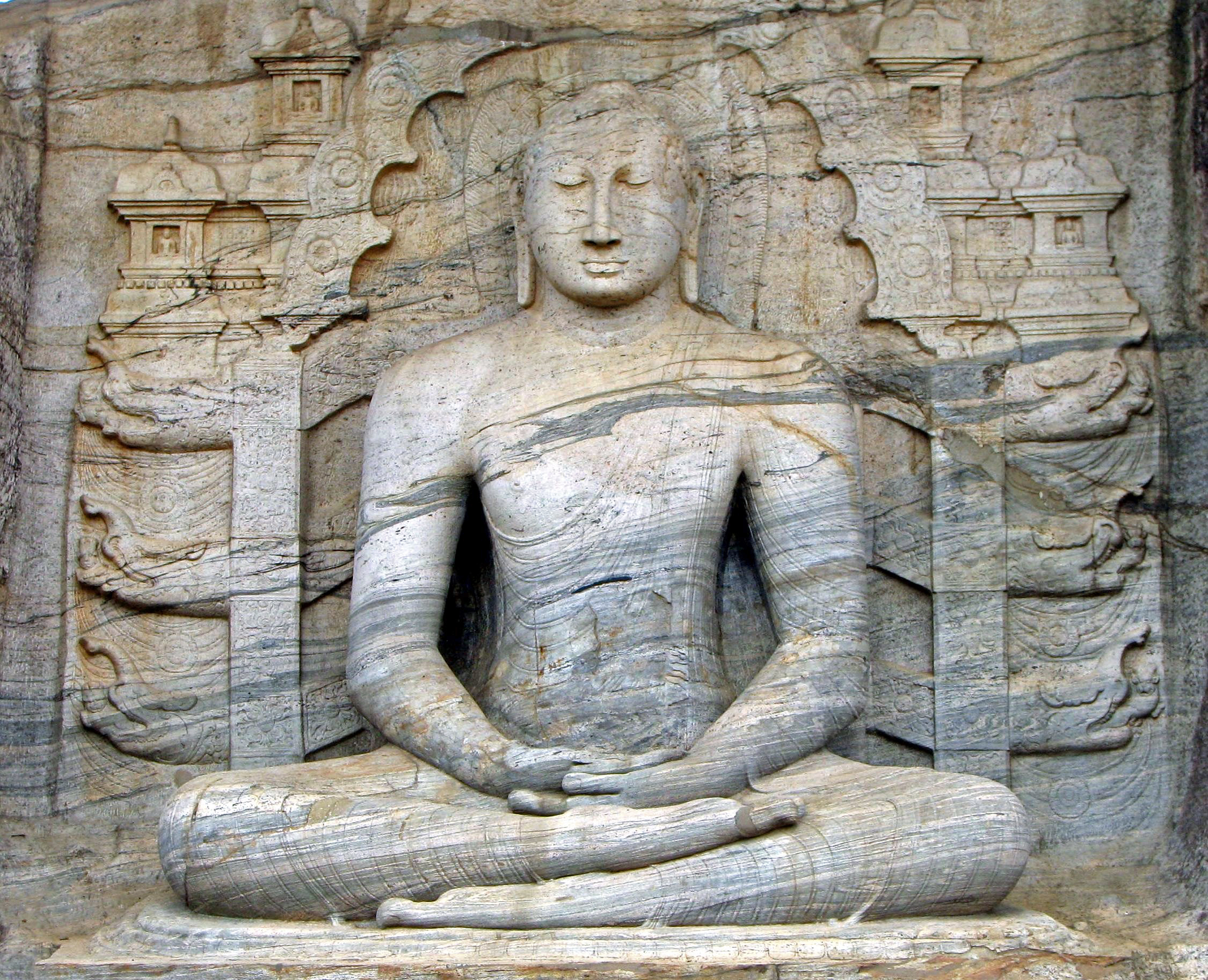
The Samadhi statue at Polonnaruwa Gal Vihara

=== Early modern tourism ===
The government initiatives in the development of tourism date back to 1937 when the Ceylon Tourist Bureau was established. However, it was closed down in September 1939 due to World War II. After Sri Lanka's independence the promotion of tourism was again considered by re-establishing the Ceylon Tourist Board which took over the function of the Tourist Bureau.

=== Post independence tourism ===
In 1965, J. R. Jayewardene as Minister of State initiated the first major development of the tourism industry with the Ceylon Tourist Board Act No 10 of 1966 and the Ceylon Hotels Corporation Act No 14 of 1966, which formed the Ceylon Tourist Board and the Ceylon Hotels Corporation. Since then the Ceylon Tourist Board has functioned as the state agency, responsible for the development and promotion of the tourism sector in Sri Lanka. Ceylon Hotels Corporation paved the way for government investments to build hotels needed to attract tourists.

When the government decided to develop the tourism sector as a separate sector of the country's economy by establishing the Ceylon Tourist Bureau in 1966, there were 18,969 foreign tourist arrivals in Sri Lanka. There was an upward trend of tourist arrivals until 1982, with the exception of 1971. Between 1976 and 1982, tourist arrivals had increased by 24% per year. The tourist traffic in 1982 showed that there was a remarkable growth in the number of tourists, with 407,230 arrivals. However, with the beginning of the civil war in 1983, the growth of tourist arrivals declined and stagnated to around 300,000 – 500,000 arrivals annually.

In October 2007 according to Section 2 of the Tourism Act No. 38 of 2005, the Sri Lanka Tourist Board (Act No 10 of 1966) was replaced by the Sri Lanka Tourism Development Authority (SLTDA).

=== Postwar period ===
Colombo skyline

The civil war that had lasted over 25 years ended in 2009 as LTTE separatists were defeated by government forces. In 2009 the tourist arrivals numbered 448,000, and in 2015, 1,798,380, showing over 300% growth in six years.

There is a significant domestic tourist segment, most commonly for family holidays, pilgrimages, and general sightseeing. In 2014 six million Sri Lankans travelled within the country as domestic tourists. The main destinations of domestic tourists are Anuradhapura, Kataragama, Nuwara Eliya, Kandy, Sri Pada, Polonnaruwa, Sigiriya and Dambulla. Domestic tourism is noticeable during school vacations and on weekends.

Sri Lanka reopened for tourism in January 2021 under a health protocol involving pre-flight and post-arrival tests for Coronavirus. Tourists could visit a series of designated locations under 'bio bubble' concept avoiding contact with locals and stay at a number of certified hotels. An updated list was made available at the Sri Lanka Tourism promotion authority website section 'Hello Again'. Prior to the official opening, a controversy erupted over tourists brought from Ukraine by a former Ambassador to Russia, where health protocols were breached. It was later described as a pilot project. The first tourists after the COVID-19 closure arrived in Ukraine's SkyUp Airlines at Mattala Airport on December 28 as part of the so-called pilot project. In January and February 2021 Sri Lanka welcomed 5,048 tourists, down from 435,941 in 2020, before airports closed in March.

== Statistics ==
Yearly overseas tourist arrivals in thousands

| Presences compared between 2018,2024 and 2025. | 2018 | 2024 | 2025 |
|---|---|---|---|
| January | 238,924 | 208,253 | 252,761 |
| February | 235,618 | 218,350 | 240,217 |
| March | 233,382 | 209,181 | 229,298 |
| April | 180,429 | 148,867 | 174,608 |
| May | 129,466 | 112,128 | 132,919 |
| June | 146,828 | 113,470 | 138,241 |
| July | 217,829 | 187,810 | 200,244 |
| August | 200,359 | 164,609 | 198,235 |
| September | 149,087 | 122,140 | 158,971 |
| October | 153,123 | 135,907 | 165,193 |
| November | 195,582 | 184,158 | 212,906 |
| December | 253,169 | 248,592 | |
| Total | 2,333,796 | 2,053,465 | 2,103,593 |

=== Visitor statistics ===
Most visitors arriving in Sri Lanka on a short-term basis were from the following countries:

Foreign visitors to Sri Lanka
| Country | 2026 (Jan) | 2025 | 2024 | 2023 | 2022 | 2021 | 2020 | 2019 | 2018 |
|---|---|---|---|---|---|---|---|---|---|
| India | 52,061 | 531,511 | 416,974 | 302,844 | 123,004 | 56,268 | 89,357 | 355,002 | |
| United Kingdom | 29,540 | 212,277 | 178,339 | 130,088 | 85,187 | 16,646 | 55,455 | 198,776 | |
| Russia | 27,134 | 186,580 | 201,920 | 197,498 | 91,272 | 16,984 | 49,397 | 86,549 | |
| Germany | 17,776 | 147,966 | 136,084 | 102,539 | 55,542 | 12,442 | 34,507 | 134,899 | |
| China | 14,003 | 132,035 | 131,681 | 68,789 | 4,715 | 2,417 | 26,147 | 167,863 | |
| France | 13,569 | 109,041 | 88,775 | 56,251 | 35,482 | 6,549 | 24,838 | 87,623 | |
| Australia | 11,172 | 109,487 | 89,573 | 67,436 | 30,924 | 4,421 | 20,283 | 92,674 | |
| Netherlands | 7,107 | 64,164 | 50,116 | 29,056 | 11,987 | 2,422 | 8,656 | 38,993 | |
| United States | 7,373 | 65,973 | 59,532 | 46,344 | 22,230 | 6,124 | 16,842 | 68,832 | |
| Bangladesh | 4,102 | 59,563 | 39,555 | 17,846 | 3,817 | 1,496 | 1,986 | 8,261 | |
| Poland | 10,334 | 49,989 | 44,165 | 17,946 | 15,195 | 2,110 | 11,908 | 20,896 | |
| Italy | 5,840 | 50,430 | 38,709 | 22,242 | 7,449 | 1,309 | 8,603 | 36,147 | |
| Spain | 3,008 | 46,038 | 37,928 | 23,905 | 12,895 | 2,015 | 3,385 | 24,489 | |
| Canada | 5,048 | 46,133 | 42,212 | 43,944 | 26,845 | 5,079 | 12,346 | 48,729 | |
| Japan | 2,896 | 38,153 | 30,429 | 19,583 | 3,087 | 392 | 6,644 | 30,079 | |
| Maldives | 4,789 | 37,165 | 47,222 | 37,298 | 18,880 | 6,272 | 9,407 | 60,278 | |
| Switzerland | 4,146 | 33,624 | 29,829 | 23,556 | 13,260 | 2,974 | 6,389 | 29,981 | |
| Malaysia | 1,566 | 23,684 | 18,259 | 10,940 | 2,779 | 323 | 3,494 | 16,861 | |
| Israel | 3,455 | 24,591 | 24,845 | 19,517 | 9,326 | 1,724 | 3,556 | 14,770 | |
| Pakistan | 1,584 | 22,296 | 13,451 | 10,744 | 6,260 | 7,520 | 3,065 | 14,655 | |
| Belgium | 1,915 | 21,056 | 17,219 | 10,667 | 6,164 | 1,283 | 3,371 | 14,948 | |
| Czech Republic | 3,265 | 19,082 | 19,279 | 12,056 | 7,350 | 1,864 | 7,599 | 19,204 | |
| Austria | 2,811 | 18,188 | 17,103 | 10,594 | 5,541 | 1,502 | 4,300 | 14,713 | |
| Denmark | 3,372 | 17,378 | 14,952 | 10,346 | 7,278 | 1,302 | 4,905 | 16,869 | |
| Singapore | 1,138 | 15,086 | 12,591 | 9,551 | 3,770 | 557 | 2,545 | 13,871 | |
| New Zealand | 1,103 | 13,456 | 11,282 | 7,913 | 2,866 | 325 | 2,324 | 12,463 | |
| Norway | 1,717 | 13,032 | 11,399 | 8,747 | 5,983 | 1,141 | 3,019 | 13,446 | |
| South Korea | 1,898 | 12,169 | 10,800 | 7,298 | 1,843 | 389 | 2,499 | 12,195 | |
| Sweden | 2,605 | 14,863 | 8,643 | 5,097 | 1,601 | 7,061 | 22,464 | | |
| Ireland | | 9,388 | 8,747 | 5,136 | 3,056 | 559 | 2,294 | 8,254 | |
| Iran | | 9,143 | 10,858 | 10,322 | 4,301 | 397 | 648 | 3,249 | |
| Kazakhstan | | 8,510 | 11,383 | 5,130 | 8,068 | 5,754 | 2,333 | 2,399 | |
| Belarus | | 8,497 | 10,933 | 10,969 | 3,621 | 646 | 2,638 | 4,796 | |
| Thailand | | 7,812 | 7,246 | 4,922 | 1,725 | 247 | 1,880 | 9,861 | |
| Ukraine | | 7, 515 | 7,099 | 5,082 | 14,917 | 7,037 | 17,169 | 35,051 | |
| Turkey | | 7,434 | 6,673 | 3,739 | 1,514 | 309 | 2,121 | 4,972 | |
| Portugal | | 7,281 | 6,489 | 3,943 | 1,906 | 372 | 1,602 | 5,193 | |
| Slovakia | | 6,346 | 6,710 | 4,464 | 2,432 | 664 | 1,513 | 4,944 | |
| Philippines | | 6,269 | 5,267 | 4,164 | 1,961 | 529 | 4,249 | 14,590 | |
| Lithuania | | 5,855 | 6,395 | 2,722 | 2,115 | 383 | 1,054 | 2,793 | |
| Saudi Arabia | | 5,785 | 5,887 | 6,797 | 5,952 | 1,596 | 4,755 | 15,707 | |
| Hungary | | 5,455 | 6,580 | 3,786 | 2,324 | 445 | 1,588 | 4,091 | |
| United Arab Emirates | | 5,275 | 4,296 | | | | | | |
| Nepal | | 5,182 | 4,463 | 4,750 | 1,065 | 325 | 1,384 | 5,414 | |
| Romania | | 5,036 | 6,407 | 4,092 | 3,313 | 820 | 1,724 | 5,463 | |
| Indonesia | | 4,599 | 3,744 | | | | | | |
| South Africa | | 4,427 | 4,872 | 3,444 | 1,502 | 272 | 1,364 | 7,132 | |
| Finland | | 4,249 | 4,276 | 2,287 | 1,500 | 341 | 2,298 | 7,028 | |
| Egypt | | 3,877 | 4,069 | 3,091 | 2,340 | 400 | 956 | 3,708 | |
| Greece | | 3,813 | 2,853 | | | | | | |
| Bulgaria | | 3,638 | 3,699 | | | | | | |
| Vietnam | | 3,462 | 2,963 | | | | | | |
| Estonia | | 3,445 | 3,800 | 1,808 | 978 | 376 | 1,185 | 2,516 | |
| Slovenia | | 3,234 | 3,477 | 1,927 | 602 | 91 | 800 | 2,926 | |
| Lebanon | | 3,085 | 3,438 | 3,347 | 1,606 | 547 | 483 | 4,304 | |
| Latvia | | 3,021 | 3,570 | | | | | | |
| Seychelles | | 2,890 | 2,691 | | | | | | |
| Jordan | | 2,704 | 2,823 | | | | | | |
| Oman | | 2,473 | 2,775 | | | | | | |
| Myanmar | | 2,410 | 1,515 | | | | | | |
| Armenia | | 2,067 | 2,634 | | | | | | |
| Serbia | | 2,034 | 2,015 | | | | | | |
| Brazil | | 1,847 | 1,945 | | | | | | |
| Croatia | | 1,741 | 1,859 | | | | | | |
| Kuwait | | 1,739 | 1,885 | | | | | | |
| Iraq | | 1,560 | 1,012 | | | | | | |
| Azerbaijan | | 1,252 | 2,035 | | | | | | |
| Bahrain | | 1,229 | 1,169 | | | | | | |
| Sudan | | 1,178 | 941 | | | | | | |
| Cyprus | | 1,132 | 1,194 | | | | | | |
| Cambodia | | 1,121 | 1,183 | | | | | | |
| Kenya | | 1,052 | 807 | | | | | | |
| Mexico | | 1,031 | 1,068 | | | | | | |
| Morocco | | 1,021 | 1,042 | | | | | | |
| Taiwan | n/a | n/a | 4,999 | 363 | 42 | 1,985 | 7,127 | | |
| Countries below 1000 | | 22,248 | | | | | | | |
| Total | | 2,103,593 | 2,053,465 | 1,487,303 | 719,978 | 194,495 | 507,704 | 1,913,702 | |

== Attractions ==
Tourist attractions are classifiable as natural or anthropogenic. Natural attractions include nature spots, flora and fauna, and places with a pleasant climate. Geotourism sites may also be included in this category. Anthropogenic attractions include archaeological and cultural attractions, historical and religion sites, performing arts and folklore, handicrafts and artifacts.

=== Wildlife ===
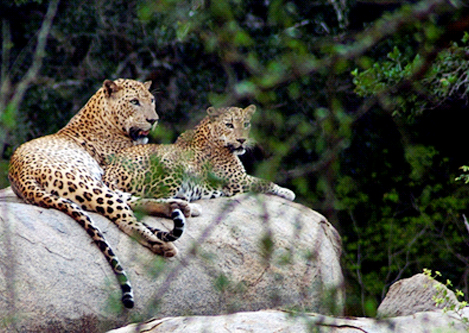
Yala National Park has the world's highest concentration of leopards per square kilometer.

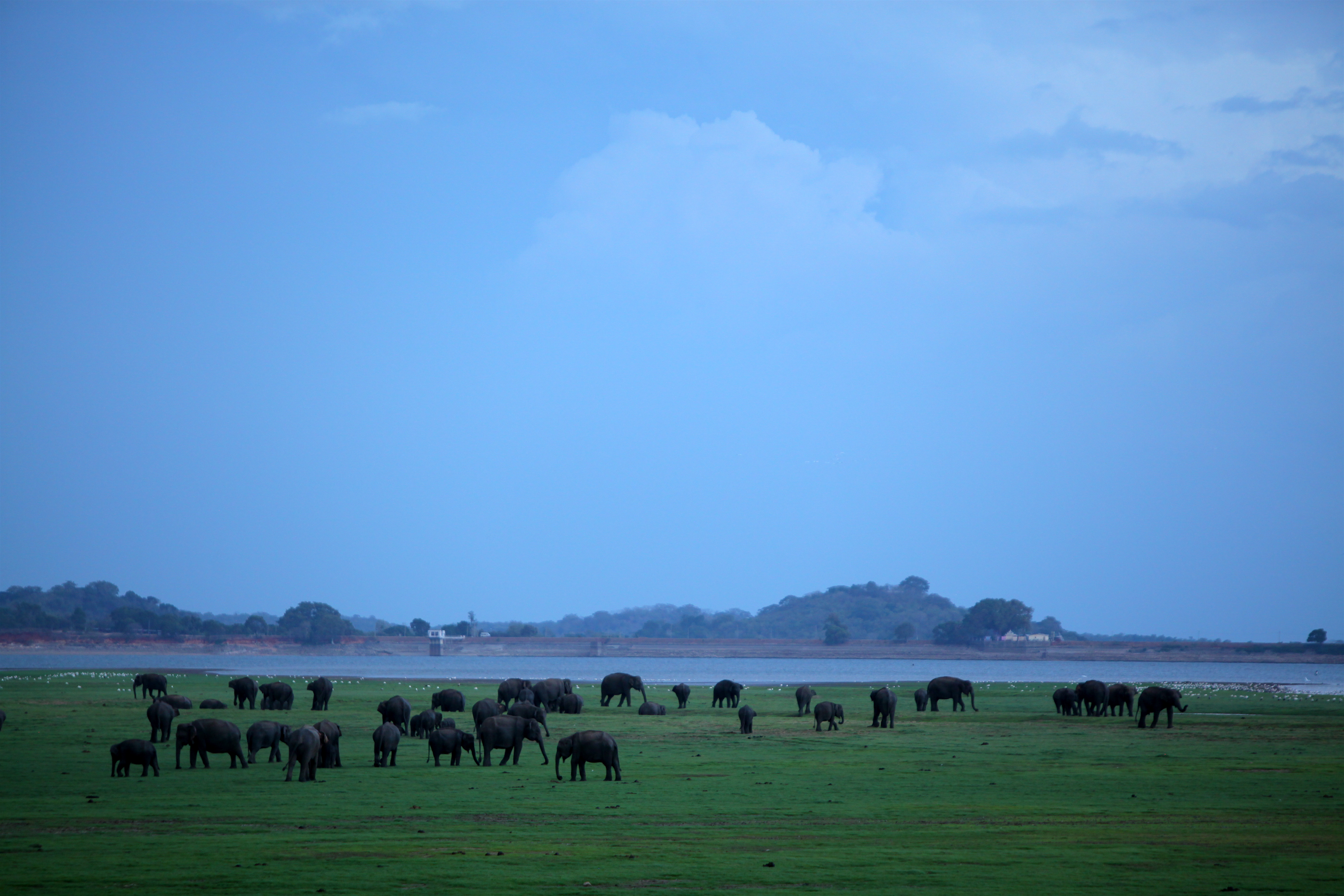
The world's largest gathering of wild Asian elephants at Minneriya park is commonly known as The Gathering.

Despite its small size, Sri Lanka possesses a high level of biodiversity and wildlife resources and is rated among the 34 biodiversity hotspots in the world. Many species of flora and fauna are indigenous to Sri Lanka. This has made the island a country with the highest rates of biological endemism in the world.

Forbes ranked Sri Lanka as one of top wildlife safaris outside of Africa, due to the actual presence of five charismatic megafauna (The Big Five) and the relative ease of seeing them during a single tour itinerary. The Leopard, the Asian elephant and Sloth Bear are found in several national parks. The Yala National Park has one of the highest concentrations of leopards in the world. Wildlife photographer and author Gehan de Silva Wijeyeratne has shown that Sri Lanka is the best place in the world to spot Blue whales. A narrow continental shelf off Mirissa, Sri Lanka allows Blue and Sperm whales to swim close to the shore. Seasonally, the largest gathering of Asian elephants numbering 200-300 or higher takes place at the Minneriya National Park.

Thirteen percent of Sri Lanka's land surface has been designated as Wildlife Protected Areas (WLPAs), which at present exceed a total area of 8,500 km^{2} (3,282 sq mi). Approximately 7% of the area is national parks, the areas allowed for the public to see and study wildlife. Sri Lanka's national parks have become popular tourist destinations.

National parks
Adam's Bridge · Angammedilla · Bundala · Chundikkulam · Delft · Flood Plains · Gal Oya · Galway's Land · Hikkaduwa · Horagolla · Horton Plains · Kaudulla · Kumana · Lahugala Kitulana · Lunugamvehera · Madhu Road · Maduru Oya · Minneriya · Pigeon Island · Somawathiya · Udawalawe · Ussangoda · Wasgamuwa · Wilpattu · Yala

=== Beaches ===
The Unawatuna beach at the southern coast of the island was named as the World's Best Beach for 2004 by Discovery Channel. In 2013 it was ranked in among the world's 100 best beaches list by CNN.

Sri Lanka possesses nearly 1,600 km (994 mi) coastlines with tropical beaches which are popular among both local and foreign tourists. Most of the coastlines of the country are studded with varying coastal features such as bays, lagoons, sandbanks, and rocky headlands. Marine recreation activities, such as sea bathing and swimming, surfing, boating, snorkelling, deep-sea fishing, underwater photography, and scuba diving, can be seen at most of these beaches and related resort areas. Beaches at Tangalle, Beruwala, Mirissa, Bentota, Unawatuna, Arugam Bay, Pasikudah, Hikkaduwa, Uppuveli and Negombo are considered as famous tourist beaches in the country.Coconut Tree Hill is a popular tourist attraction in Mirissa Beach and one of the most Instagrammed locations in Sri Lanka.

Related attractions
Hummanaya · Stilt fishing

=== Natural scenic beauty ===
Sri Lanka has numerous tourist attractions with areas of natural scenic beauty, primarily including mountainous terrains, agricultural landscapes, waterfalls, places with diverse climatic conditions, reservoirs (wewas), and rivers.

Related attractions
Waterfalls of Sri Lanka · Mountains of Sri Lanka · Rivers of Sri Lanka

=== Botanical/zoological gardens ===
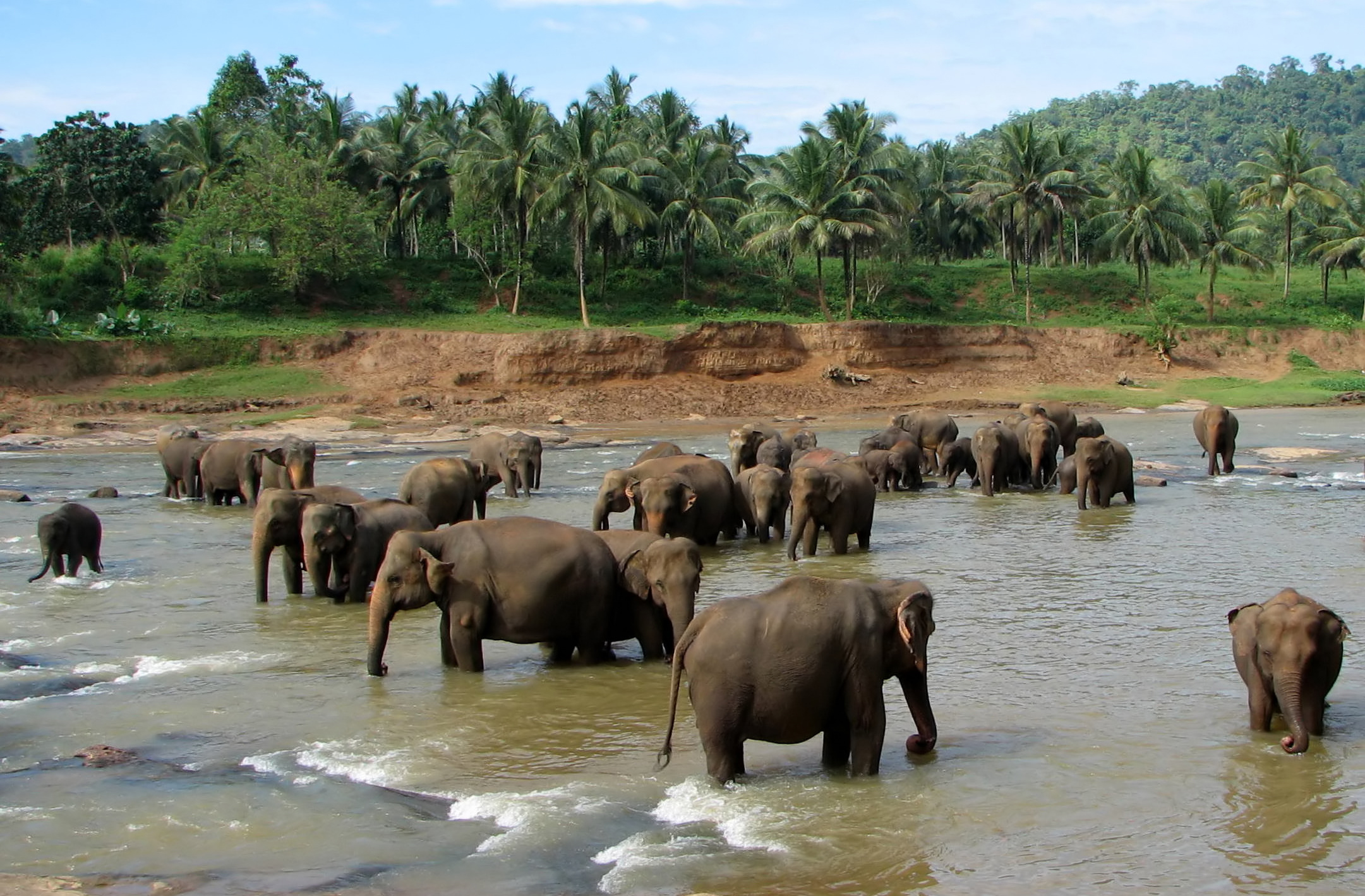
Herd of elephants at Pinnawala Elephant Orphanage

The country has six botanical gardens and four Zoological gardens. The botanical gardens are maintained by the Department of National Botanical Gardens, and the zoological gardens are maintained by the Department of National Zoological Gardens. The gardens have become attractive places among local and foreign visitors.

Botanical Gardens
Royal Botanic Gardens, Peradeniya · Hakgala Botanical Garden · Henarathgoda Botanical Garden · Mirijjawila Botanical Garden · Seetawaka Botanical Garden · Ganewatta Forest Medicinal Herbal Botanical Garden

Zoological Gardens
National Zoological Gardens · Pinnawala Elephant Orphanage · Pinnawala Open Zoo · Ridiyagama Safari Park

=== Bird Watching ===
Sri Lanka is home to 26 endemic-bird species and seven proposed endemic species. The total number of bird species recorded in the island is 492 of which 219 are breeding residents. Field Ornithology Group of Sri Lanka, commonly abbreviated FOGSL, is the Sri Lankan affiliate of BirdLife International. It was founded in 1976 to promote the conservation of birds and preservation of the environment. FOGSL headquarters are situated in the Department of Zoology, University of Colombo, Sri Lanka. Identifying and proposing Important Bird Areas (IBAs) in Sri Lanka is one of the main activities of the group. From 2008, Field Ornithology Group conducts a bird count in December in the lines of Christmas Bird Count by the National Audubon Society of the United States. Sri Lanka's location at the tip of the Indian subcontinent has made the island a termination point in the north–south bird migratory route.

The small grants programme of the United Nations Development Programme granted the Field Ornithology Group US$20,308.00 for printing of selected publications and other activities. As part of their educational programmes, Field Ornithology Group has published many books and posters, not only on birds but also mammals and wetlands. The FOGSL also publish two periodicals, Kedetta in Sinhala and Malkoha in English.

=== Heritage ===
Sigiriya the ancient stone fortress considered by many to be the eighth wonder of the world.

Heritage tourism involves visiting historical sites. Sri Lanka is very rich in pre-historic, proto-historic, and historic monuments, which bespeak its ancient civilization and culture. Mainly Buddhism has influenced in the moulding of the cultural heritage of the country. The historic period of Sri Lanka proper starts circa 236 B.C. with the introduction of Buddhism to the country by the missionaries sent by the Indian empire Asoka.

The UNESCO has declared six archaeological and two ecological World Heritage Sites in the country. Beside the world heritage sites the government of Sri Lanka has declared a number of archaeological protected sites and monuments within the country.

World Heritage Sites
Anuradhapura · Central Highlands of Sri Lanka · Dambulla cave temple · Galle · Polonnaruwa · Sigiriya · Sinharaja Forest Reserve · Temple of the Tooth

Archaeological Protected Monuments
Nuwara Eliya District · Matale District · Kandy District · Ampara District · Trincomalee District · Batticaloa District · Anuradhapura District · Polonnaruwa District · Kurunegala District · Puttalam District · Kilinochchi District · Mannar District · Mullaitivu District · Jaffna District · Vavuniya District · Kegalle District · Ratnapura District · Galle District · Matara District · Hambantota District · Badulla District · Monaragala District · Colombo District · Kalutara District · Gampaha District

=== Pilgrimage ===
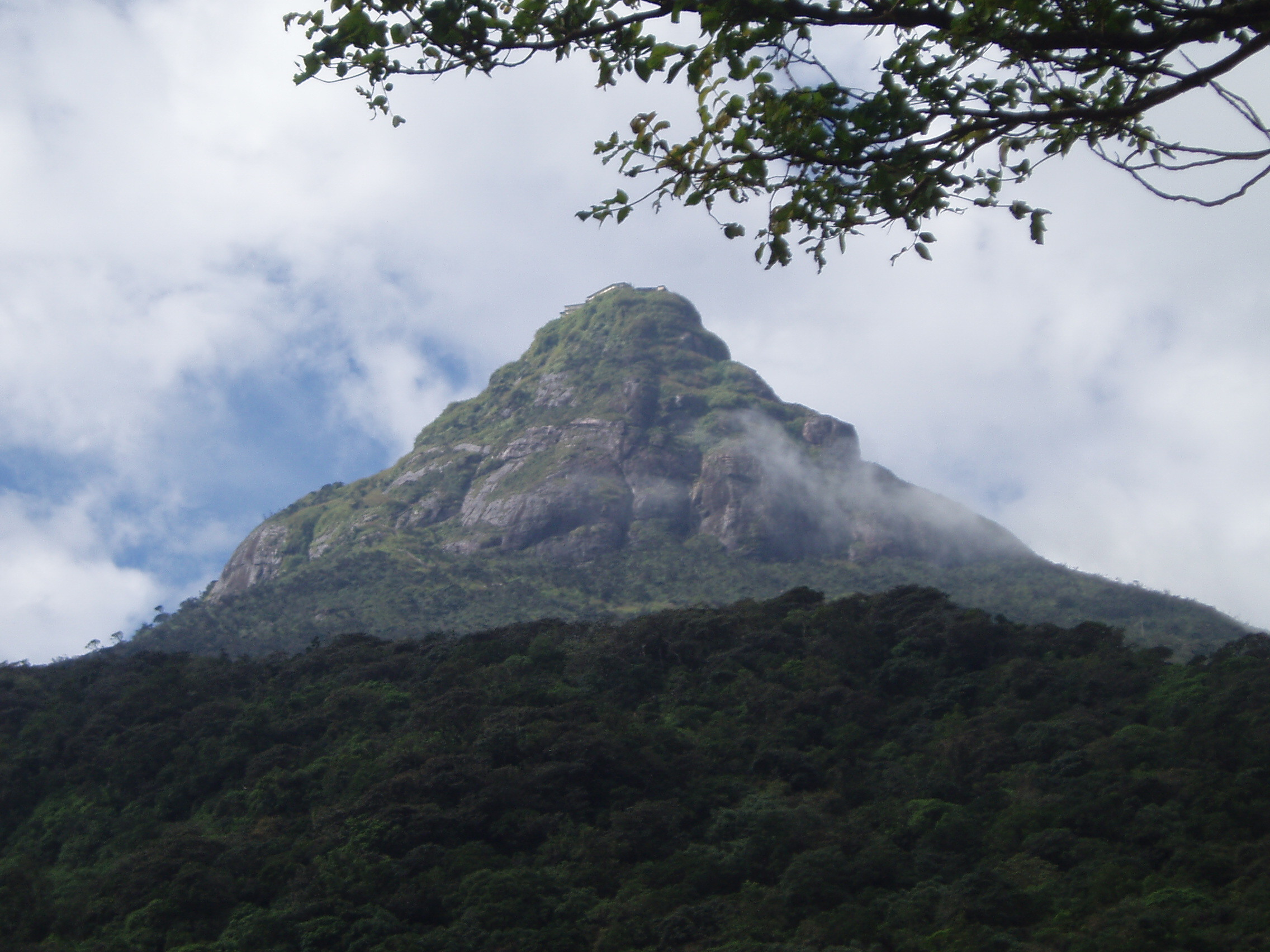
The mountain of Adams Peak (Sri Pada) is one of the places where people of four major religions worship together.

Sri Lanka is well known for its rich Buddhist culture as well as other religions. Being a religious country, Sri Lanka has many places with religious and historic significance, which attract tourists from all over the world. Anuradhapura, Temple of the Tooth, Adam's Peak, Shrine of Our Lady of Madhu and Kataragama, are a few famous religious sites on the island that attract a large number of tourists.

The foot pilgrimage called Pada Yatra, which is one of Sri Lanka's oldest traditions, has been practised for centuries, where the local people from Jaffna come along the East Coast to Kataragama shrine.

Related attractions
Buddhist Vihara in Sri Lanka · Hindu temples in Sri Lanka · Atamasthana · Solosmasthana

=== Sports and adventure ===
Sports tourism is defined as either people being involved in, observing or participating in a particular sporting event for leisure. Sri Lanka is also a destination for sports such as cricket, rugby, golf and surfing. Except for cricket, the contribution to the tourism sector from other sports is still at a very low level. Apart from mainstream sports events, adventure sports are also included in sports tourism. Trekking, hiking, diving, rock climbing, deep sea fishing, whale watching, kitesurfing and hot air ballooning are some of the adventure sports those can be found in Sri Lanka.

Related attractions
Whale watching in Sri Lanka

=== Culture and other ===
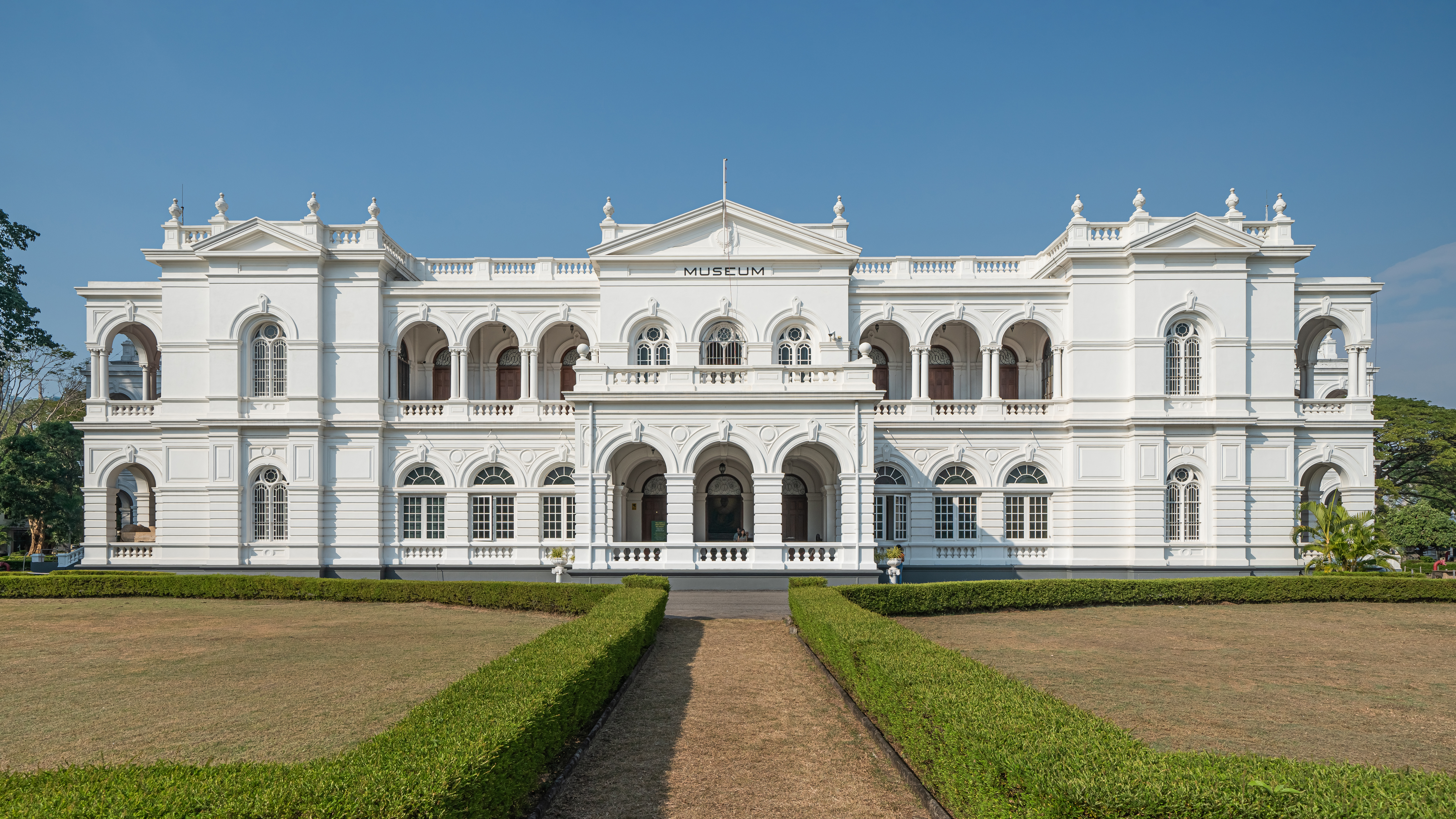
National Museum of Colombo, established in 1877

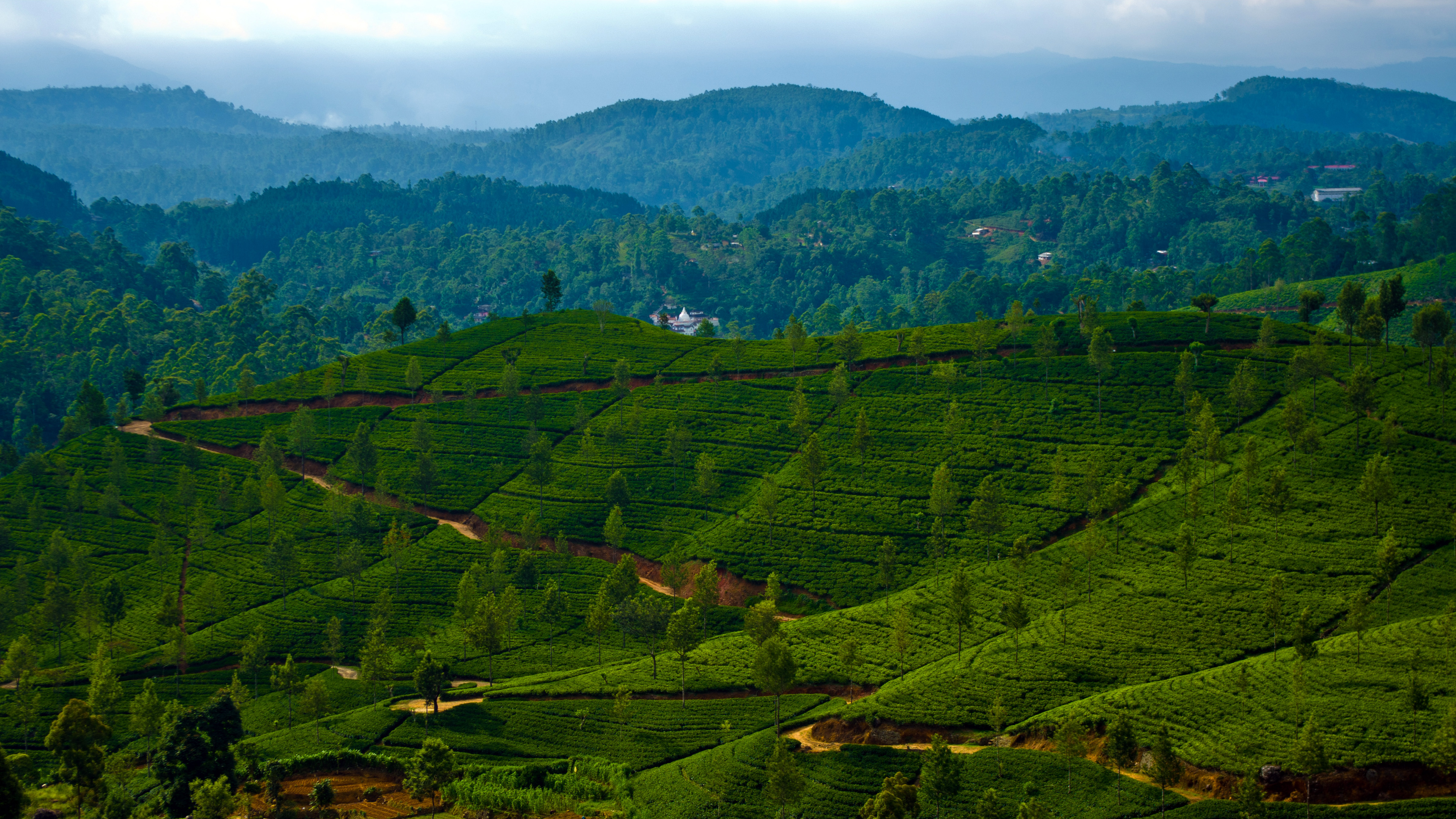
Tea tourism is a relatively new concept, which is already practiced in Sri Lanka.

Cultural tourism includes tourism in urban areas, particularly historic or large cities and their cultural facilities such as museums and theatres.

Museums and theatres – Currently four national museums and 26 archaeological museums have been established in Sri Lanka. National museums are maintained by the Department of National Museums and archaeological museums by the Department of Archaeology. Besides the museums, a large number of theatres also can be found in Sri Lanka.

Festivals – Sri Lanka is a multi-cultural country with several different festivals celebrated by various communities. The Kandy Esala Perahera, Sinhala and Tamil New Year celebrations, Vesak Festival, Christmas, Ramadan festival, Thai Pongal, and the Galle Literary Festival are a few of the major festivals.

Performing arts – There are three main traditional dance forms in Sri Lanka: Kandyan dancing, low country dancing, and Sabaragamuwa dancing. Though not unique to Sri Lanka, 'Bharatanatyam', which originated from India is also popular in Sri Lanka, particularly among the Tamil community.

Food – The cuisine of Sri Lanka has been influenced by many historical, cultural, and other factors. Rice is the main staple diet of the country. Other staples include hoppers, string hoppers, and pittu.

Being one of the largest producers of tea in the world Sri Lanka is best known for the production of unorthodox tea. Tea was introduced to the country by the British who called the country "Ceylon". Pure Ceylon tea is considered some of the finest tea produced anywhere in the world.

Handicrafts – Handicrafts available in Sri Lanka include wood carving, silverware, brass castings, ceramic ware, bamboo products, pottery, batiks, lace works, cane works, costume jewellery, lacquerware, wooden masks, coir goods, handlooms, and ivory products.

Related attractions
Museums in Sri Lanka · Theatre of Sri Lanka · Festivals in Sri Lanka · Esala Perahera · Dances of Sri Lanka · Sri Lankan cuisine · Sri Lankan sweets and desserts

=== Shared Tourism with India ===
In the past, ferry services between India and Sri Lanka for tourists used to be introduced and suspended repeatedly because of their low usage. The low usage of the old ferry services could be due to the high cost of the former services. As of now, the only way for tourists to access India from Sri Lanka and vice versa is by air. In 2019 negotiations about ferry services between Colombo and Tuticorin and between Talaimannar and Rameshwaram began. There is also a proposal to operate a cruise/ferry service between Colombo and Kochi in Kerala. The Indian and Sri Lankan governments are working closely together to connect the two neighbouring countries better. The Sri Lankan minister of Tourism Development John Amaratunga indicated that ferry service will help tourists from both sides to travel at a very low cost.

== Accommodations ==
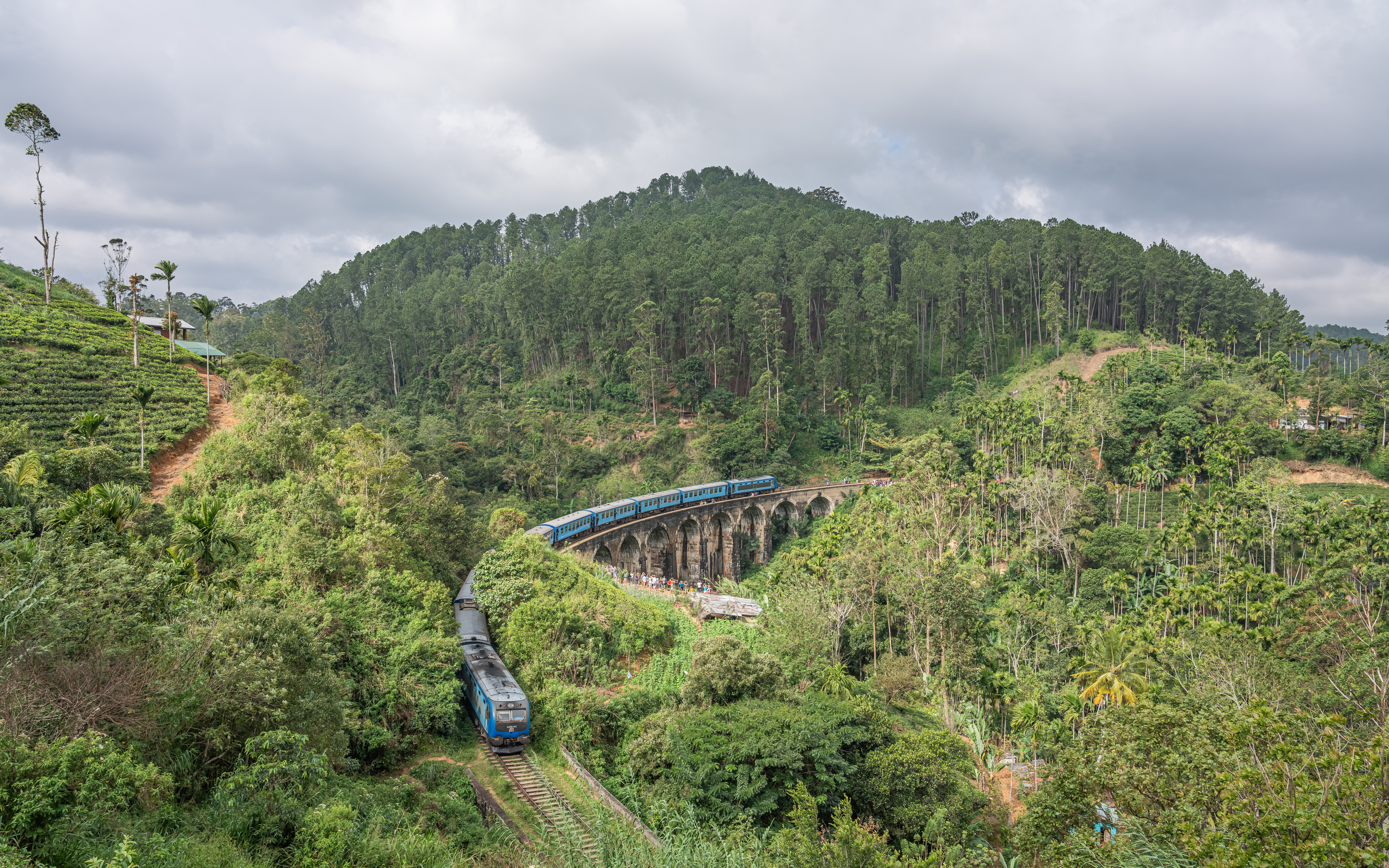
Sri Lanka railway train Passing through Demodara bridge in Ella

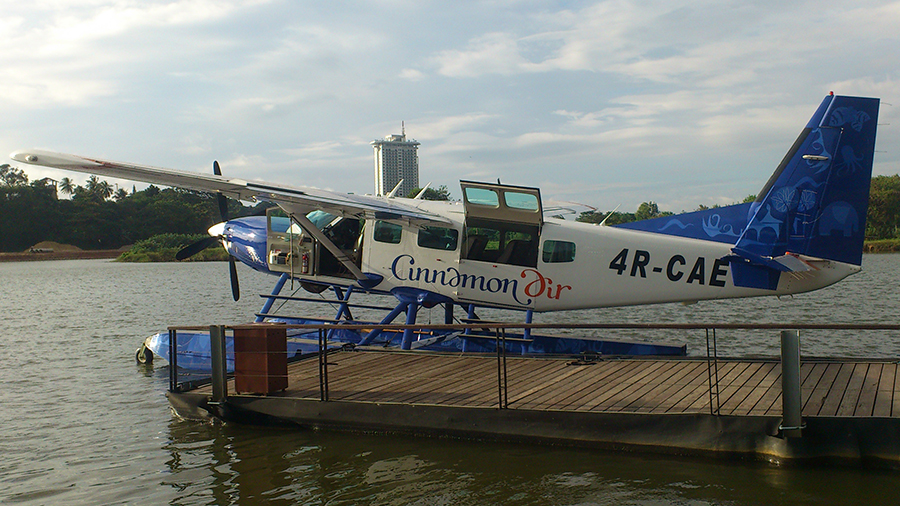
Cinnamon Air seaplane in Colombo

Tourist accommodations in Sri Lanka consist of graded hotels, supplementary establishments, guest houses and limited-scale camping sites. More informal accommodation is available on a paying guest system in private houses and hill-country tea estate bungalows.

== Earnings ==
The tourist industry makes a significant contribution to the national economy by directly contributing to the government budget, foreign exchange earnings and employment generation. It contributes both directly and indirectly, in the provision of goods and services to the tourist sector.

| Year | Total Revenue of Tourism Industry ( million. US$) |
|---|---|
| 2015 | ▲$2,980 |
| 2016 | ▲$3,518 |
| 2017 | ▲$3,924 |
| 2018 | ▲$4,380 |
| 2019 | ▼$3,606 |
| 2020 | ▼$682 |
| 2021 | ▼$506 |
| 2022 | ▲$1,256 |
| 2023 | ▲$2,068 |
| 2024 | ▲$3,170 |

== Social and environmental impacts ==
Tourism in Sri Lanka, despite its generated income into the economy, had received some critics. The high biodiversity of Sri Lanka seems to be threatened by the development of mass tourism which has already affected several natural reserves. Some endangered animal species seem to be seriously threatened by the rise of tourism in some areas; that is the case with the Kirthisinghe's Rock Frog, which is endemic in Sri Lanka.

An alternative kind of tourism, called ecotourism, sustainable tourism or responsible tourism, enables travellers to participate in tourism throughout Sri Lanka while contributing to the well-being of the local communities and making sure their environmental impact is limited. The Sri Lanka Ecotourism Foundation is the national organization that created an official ecotourism network through the island, allowing to develop sustainable tourism with wide options of travel. In 2010, the foundation won the presidential award for "Outstanding Contribution to Tourism in Sri Lanka".

== Elephants in tourism ==
Elephant trekking, or elephant riding is a significant attraction for tourists coming to visit Sri Lanka. It is traditionally seen as a way of getting closer to nature, often taking place in sanctuaries and orphanages. The largest orphanage in Sri Lanka is Pinnawala, which, as of 2023, houses more than 90 elephants.

Since their wild instincts remain, elephants must be broken and controlled to be able to work, be around humans, and give rides. One of the traditional methods used by the tourism industry is the 'phajaan', also known as elephant crushing or 'breaking the elephant's spirit'. A report by Born Free in 2007 into Pinnawala, revealed questionable animal welfare standards including: chaining male elephants during 'musth' causing wounds to the legs and training elephants with the threat of pain from an 'ankus'.

During elephant trekking experiences, other concerns include the use of howdahs, which combined with the weight of a tourist, can cause agonising and permanent spinal damage. Additionally, high tourist demand for elephant trekking means that elephants may also be forced to work long hours in hot and humid conditions.

=== Laws and Regulations ===
In September 2021, the Sri Lankan government introduced new animal protection laws. These measures included strict regulation around working with elephants, mandated daily two-and-a-half-hour bath for each animal, required all animals to have new photo identity cards, and to have a medical check-up every six months, among other provisions. Those who fail to comply could be charged with three years in prison, with their elephants taken into state care.

However, pundits argued that the law had loopholes which could still be exploited. According to the former president of the Wildlife and Nature Protection Society, Rukshan Jayawardena, the law [legitimised] the ownership of 30 to 40 elephant that were kidnapped from the wild, mostly between 2010 and 2015.

Whilst there has been sufficient local legislation to stop the illegal capture and trade of Asian Elephants in Sri Lanka, research has found that effort to stop these illicit activities have been hampered due to corruption among wildlife officers, politicians, clergymen and military personnel.

== See also ==
- Economy of Sri Lanka
- Travel and Tourism Competitiveness Report
- Visa policy of Sri Lanka
- World Tourism Organization
- World Travel Monitor
