= List of national parks of Sri Lanka =

National parks are a class of protected areas in Sri Lanka and are administered by the Department of Wildlife Conservation. National parks are governed by the Fauna and Flora Protection Ordinance (No. 2) of 1937 and may be created, amended or abolished by ministerial order. All of the land in national parks are state-owned and the entire habitat is protected. Activities prohibited in national parks include hunting, killing or removing any wild animal; destroying eggs/nests of birds and reptiles; disturbing of wild animals; interfering in the breeding of any animal; felling/damaging of any plant; breaking up land for cultivation/mining/other purpose; kindling/carrying of fire; and possessing/using any trap/explosive/poison to damage animal or plant life. Visitors are allowed to enter national parks but only for the purpose of observing flora and fauna and with a permit. There are currently 26 national parks which together cover an area of 5,734 km^{2} (2,214 sq mi).

== National parks ==
National parks of Sri Lanka (clickable map)

National park	Image	Location	Established	Area	
National park	Image	Location	Established	km^{2}	mi^{2}
Adam’s Bridge		Northern Province	22 June 2015	190	73
Angammedilla		North Central Province	6 June 2006	75	29
Bundala		Southern Province	4 January 1993	62	24
Chundikkulam		Northern Province	22 June 2015	196	76
Delft		Northern Province	22 June 2015	18	7
Flood Plains		North Central Province	7 August 1984	174	67
Gal Oya		Eastern Province; Uva Province	12 February 1954	259	100
Galway's Land		Central Province	18 May 2006	0	0
Hikkaduwa		Southern Province	8 October 2002	1	0
Horagolla		Western Province	28 July 2004	0	0
Horowpathana		North Central Province	6 December 2011	26	10
Horton Plains		Central Province	16 March 1988	32	12
Kaudulla		North Central Province	1 April 2002	69	27
Kumana (Yala East)		Eastern Province	20 January 1970	181	70
Lahugala Kitulana		Eastern Province	31 October 1980	16	6
Lunugamvehera		Southern Province; Uva Province	8 December 1995	235	91
Madhu Road		Northern Province	22 June 2015	164	63
Maduru Oya		Eastern Province; Uva Province	9 November 1983	588	227
Minneriya		North Central Province	12 August 1997	89	34
Pigeon Island		Eastern Province	24 June 2003	5	2
Somawathiya		Eastern Province; North Central Province	2 September 1986	376	145
Udawalawe		Sabaragamuwa Province; Uva Province	30 June 1972	308	119
Ussangoda		Southern Province	6 May 2010	3	1
Wasgamuwa		Central Province; North Central Province	7 August 1984	371	143
Wilpattu		North Central Province; North Western Province	25 February 1938	1,317	508
Yala (Ruhuna)		Southern Province; Uva Province	25 February 1938	979	378
Total				5,734	2,214

== See also ==
- List of National Parks in South Asia
