= Kokkilai Sanctuary =

Wildlife sanctuary in Sri Lanka

- கொக்குளாய் சரணாலயம்
- IUCN category IV (habitat/species management area)
- Location within Northern Province
- Location: Northern Province
- Nearest city: Mullaitivu
- Coordinates: 09°01′25″N 80°55′55″E
- Area: 20 km^{2} (8 sq mi)
- Established: 18 May 1951
- Owner: Government of Sri Lanka
- Administrator: Department of Wildlife Conservation

Kokkilai Sanctuary (Tamil: கொக்குளாய் சரணாலயம் Kokkuḷāy Caraṇālayam) is a wildlife sanctuary in north eastern Sri Lanka, approximately 25 km (16 mi) south east of Mullaitivu.

== History ==
Kokkilai Lagoon and its surrounding area was designated as a bird sanctuary on 18 May 1951 under the Fauna and Flora Protection Ordinance (No. 2) of 1937. It had an area of 2,995 ha (7,401 acres) in 1990. It currently has an area of 1,995 ha (4,930 acres).

Following the end of the Sri Lankan Civil War the government announced plans to convert various sanctuaries in the Northern Province, including Kokkilai, into national parks. Four new national parks were created in the Northern Province on 22 June 2015 but Kokkilai remains only a sanctuary.

An Integrated Strategic Environmental Assessment of Northern Province produced by the government with the assistance of United Nations Development Programme and United Nations Environment Programme and published in October 2014 recommended that Kokkilai sanctuary be extended northwards to include Nai Aru Lagoon.

Kokkilai Sanctuary has been subject to illegal deforestation. In 2010 1,000 acres were bulldozed destroying up to 3,000 weaver bird nests.

== Flora and fauna ==
Kokkilai Lagoon is partly surrounded by mangrove swamps and sea grass beds. The surrounding area includes cultivated land, scrub and open forests. Numerous varieties of water and wader birds are found in the sanctuary including cormorants, ducks, egrets, flamingoes, herons, ibis, pelicans and storks. The sanctuary is a haven for birds migrating along Sri Lanka's east coast. Elephants are also found in the sanctuary.
