= Sri Lanka Ecotourism Foundation =

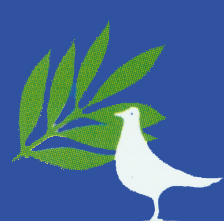
- Abbreviation: SLEF
- Founded: 1998
- Founder: Palitha Gurusinghe
- Purpose: Responsible tourism
- Location: Madapatha, Sri Lanka
- Region served: South Asia
- Method: Ecotourism, Community Tourism, Research
- Awards: Presidential award for “Outstanding Contribution for Tourism in Sri Lanka” Sri Lanka Tourism Awards 2012: Best Model Community Based Tourism Project and Best Initiative for Ecotourism Research, Training and Education
- Website: ecotourismsrilanka.net

Sri Lanka Ecotourism Foundation (abbreviated SLEF) is a national association of Sri Lanka that aims to create a wide network of ecotourism actors throughout the country. The organization focuses on developing the economic and social development of rural communities through tourism.

SLEF supports local communities to take part in community based tourism and conservation projects. The organization has been founded in 1998 by Palitha Gurusinghe, who is a member of Advisory Board of The International Ecotourism Society and a famous presenter in Ecotourism and Community Based Tourism.

== Objectives ==
Sri Lanka Ecotourism Foundation aims to use tourism as a tool to support the social and economic development or rural communities throughout Sri Lanka. The foundation has been leading poverty alleviation programs through ecotourism and is motivating local communities to take part in community based ecotourism and nature conservation projects.

The main objective of SLEF is the promotion of a sustainable form of tourism within Sri Lanka in order to position the country as one of the best ecotourism destinations in South Asia. To do so, the foundation urges on community and private sector participation, infrastructure improvements and regional cooperation.

According to SLEF, ecotourism could limit environmental degradation while promoting cooperation between private and public sectors in Sri Lanka. Ecotourism is also viewed as a way to reduce poverty in the tourism generating areas of the island, contribute to economic growth, raise employment and allow the promotion of natural and cultural sites conservation.

== Projects ==
Sri Lanka Ecotourism Foundation is currently leading several community based ecotourism projects throughout Sri Lanka. The foundation provides tours within its ecotourism network through its company Sri Lanka Ecotours. SLEF is promoting community based ecolodges and has launched an ecolodge project in order to educate those who are planning to build this type of tourist accommodation in or around protected areas, for them to do so with a minimum impact on the environment.

SLEF is also addressing the climate change issues while promoting sustainable energies. The foundation supports small and medium scale Sri Lankan entrepreneurs in Capacity Building/Training on renewable energy systems, with an emphasis on the solar energy.

SLEF is providing a compilation of Eco-labeling, Accreditation and Certification Programmes for Small and Medium Enterprises within the Tourism Sector in Sri Lanka. The foundation is leading training programmes to educate enterprises about Community Camping, Renewable Energy Sources, Forests and Wildlife, Ecolodges and Community Based Ecotourism Projects in Sri Lanka.

== Awards and recognition ==
SLEF has been awarded the 2010 presidential award for “Outstanding Contribution for Tourism in Sri Lanka”, giving the foundation a great national recognition.

SLEF has received two awards during the Sri Lanka Tourism Awards 2012: Best Model Community Based Tourism Project, and Best Initiative for Ecotourism Research, Training and Education. Thus, SLEF became the first Sri Lankan ecotourism organization to be granted such a national recognition. Sri Lanka Tourism Awards reward organizations and individuals for their efforts to strengthen and empower the Sri Lankan tourism industry.
