= Madhu Road National Park =

National park in Sri Lanka

- மடு றோட் தேசிய பூங்கா මඩු පාර ජාතික වනෝද්‍යානය
- IUCN category II (national park)
- Location within Northern Province Location within Sri Lanka
- Location: Northern Province
- Nearest city: Mannar
- Coordinates: 08°55′50″N 80°12′50″E
- Area: 631 km^{2} (244 sq mi)
- Established: 28 June 1968 (sanctuary); 22 June 2015 (national park)
- Owner: Government of Sri Lanka
- Administrator: Department of Wildlife Conservation

Madhu Road National Park (Tamil: மடு றோட் தேசிய பூங்கா, romanized: Maṭu Ṟōṭ Tēciya Pūṅkā; Sinhala: මඩු පාර ජාතික වනෝද්‍යානය, romanized: Maḍu Pāra Jātika Vanōdyānaya ) is a national park in northern Sri Lanka, approximately 25 km (16 mi) east of Mannar.

== History ==
The Madhu Road area was designated as a sanctuary on 28 June 1968 under the Fauna and Flora Protection Ordinance (No. 2) of 1937. The sanctuary had an area of 26,677 ha (65,920 acres).

Following the end of the Sri Lankan Civil War the government announced plans to convert various sanctuaries in the Northern Province into national parks. The sanctuary was subject to illegal sand excavation, tree felling and unplanned development by the government. An Integrated Strategic Environmental Assessment of Northern Province produced by the government with the assistance of United Nations Development Programme and United Nations Environment Programme and published in October 2014 recommended that Madhu Road sanctuary, excluding developed areas, and the surrounding state-owned forests be upgraded to a national park. The recommendation would see the sanctuary's area grow from 26,677 ha (65,920 acres) to 63,067 ha (155,843 acres) as a result of absorbing state-owned forests nearby. The Shrine of Our Lady of Madhu would be located inside the national park.

In May 2015 the government announced that Madhu Road, along with Adam's Bridge, Chundikkulam and Delft would be designated national parks. Madhu Road sanctuary became a national park on 22 June 2015 with an area of 63,067 ha (155,843 acres). (Note: Another source gives the national park's area as 16,367 ha (40,445 acres).)

== Flora and fauna ==
Numerous varieties of birds are found in Madhu Road including Alexandrine parakeet, ashy-crowned sparrow-lark, ashy prinia, ashy woodswallow, Asian koel, Asian palm swift, baya weaver, black drongo, black-hooded oriole, black-rumped flameback, black-winged kite, blue-faced malkoha, brahminy kite, brown-headed barbet, changeable hawk-eagle, common emerald dove, common iora, common myna, common tailorbird, common woodshrike, coppersmith barbet, crested honey buzzard, crimson-fronted barbet, greater coucal, greater racket-tailed drongo, Asian green bee-eater, green imperial pigeon, grey-breasted prinia, house crow, house sparrow, Indian paradise flycatcher, Indian peafowl, Indian robin, Indian roller, Jerdon's bush lark, Jerdon's leafbird, jungle crow, jungle prinia, large cuckooshrike, Malabar pied hornbill, orange-breasted green pigeon, oriental magpie-robin, paddyfield pipit, plain prinia, Sri Lanka green pigeon, purple sunbird, red-rumped swallow, red-vented bulbul, red-wattled lapwing, rock dove, rose-ringed parakeet, scaly-breasted munia, shikra, small minivet, spotted dove, Sri Lanka grey hornbill, Sri Lankan junglefowl, tawny-bellied babbler, white-bellied sea eagle, white-browed bulbul, white-browed fantail, white-rumped munia, white-rumped shama, yellow-billed babbler, yellow-eyed babbler and Zitting cisticola. Mammals found in the park include Asian elephant, bear, chevrotain, chital, golden jackal, grey langur, grizzled giant squirrel, Indian grey mongoose, Indian hare, Indian palm squirrel, leopard, muntjac, purple-faced langur, ruddy mongoose, toque macaque, water buffalo and wild boar.
