= Kayankerni Marine Sanctuary =

Sri Lankan marine sanctuary

Coordinates: 7°59′45″N 81°31′50″E

Kayankerni Marine Sanctuary is a marine sanctuary composed of coral reefs located between Panichankerni and Kalkudah in the Batticaloa District in Sri Lanka's Eastern Province.

== Coral reef ==
Kayankerni coral reef is a typical shallow reef with an average length of around roughly 2.5 km (1.6 mi) along the coast at the southern end of the Vandalous Bay. The waters within the territories of the reef is measured on an average depth of within 1 and 1.5 m (3 ft 3 in and 4 ft 11 in) whereas the outer ends of the reef is remarkably measured at 6–7 m (20–23 ft).

The reef extends from Thennadi Bay across Vandalous Bay and Elephant Point Bay all the way culminating towards Kalkudah Bay and covering around 800 m (2,600 ft) from the coast. The coral reef is at the forefront in alleviation of the coastal erosion and forms a natural breakwater.

== History ==
In April 2019, Kayankerni Reef was officially gazetted by the Ministry of Tourism and Lands under the provisions articulated in the Fauna and Flora Protection Ordinance and it was declared as a sanctuary by the Department of Wildlife Conservation after the gazette approval obtained from the Ministry of Tourism and Lands. Approximately 953 ha (2,350 acres) of land within the distance covering Korale Pattu - North Divisional Secretary's Division in the Batticaloa District, Eastern Province were officially declared as the Kayankerni Marine Sanctuary with immediate effect as of 11 April 2019.

Dilmah Conservation apparently collaborated with the Department of Wildlife Conservation to persuade and convince Ministry of Tourism and Lands to gazette the modifications pertaining to the conservation status of Kayankerni Reef. Kayankerni Marine Sanctuary was declared as a protected site considering the potential threats of degradation of the coral reef in the area owing to illegal human activities. Marine Environment Protection Authority issued warnings about the coral bleaching due to climate change and the impact of illegal fishing activities which were proven detrimental to the coral reefs in Sri Lanka including the reefs at Kayankerni Marine Sanctuary.

In 2024, Commercial Bank of Ceylon volunteered to pledge its commitment to safeguard and conserve the Kayankerni Marine Sanctuary by joining in as a partner of Biodiversity Sri Lanka for the "Life to Our Coral Reefs" project.

== See also ==
- List of wildlife sanctuaries of Sri Lanka
