= TIES =

TIES may refer to:

- TIES, Teacher Institute for Evolutionary Science
- TIES, The Interactive Encyclopedia System
- TIES, Time Independent Escape Sequence
- Theoretical Issues in Ergonomics Science
- The International Ecotourism Society
