= Chundikkulam National Park =

National park in Sri Lanka

- சுண்டிக்குளம் தேசிய பூங்கா චුණ්ඩිකුලම ජාතික වනෝද්‍යානය
- IUCN category II (national park)
- Location within Northern Province
- Location: Northern Province
- Nearest city: Kilinochchi
- Coordinates: 09°29′55″N 80°30′25″E
- Area: 196 km^{2} (76 sq mi)
- Established: 25 February 1938 (sanctuary); 22 June 2015 (national park)
- Owner: Government of Sri Lanka
- Administrator: Department of Wildlife Conservation

Chundikkulam National Park (Tamil: சுண்டிக்குளம் தேசிய பூங்கா, romanized: Cuṇṭikkuḷam Tēciya Pūṅkā; Sinhala: චුණ්ඩිකුලම ජාතික වනෝද්‍යානය, romanized: Cuṇḍikulama Jātika Vanōdyānaya) is a national park in northern Sri Lanka, approximately 12 km (7 mi) north east of Kilinochchi.

== History ==
Chundikkulam Lagoon and its surrounding area was designated as a bird sanctuary on 25 February 1938 under the Fauna and Flora Protection Ordinance (No. 2) of 1937.

In January 2009 the Sri Lanka Army's 55 Division, advancing from Nagar Kovil, re-captured the area around Chundikkulam sanctuary from the militant Liberation Tigers of Tamil Eelam. Subsequently, the Sri Lankan military started building military bases in the sanctuary and barred local fishermen from using the sanctuary and local residents from returning to their homes. The army opened the Chundikulam Nature Park Holiday Resort in the northern part of the sanctuary in January 2012.

Following the end of the Sri Lankan Civil War the government announced plans to convert various sanctuaries in the Northern Province into national parks. An Integrated Strategic Environmental Assessment of Northern Province produced by the government with the assistance of United Nations Development Programme and United Nations Environment Programme and published in October 2014 recommended that Chundikkulam sanctuary be extended westwards towards Elephant Pass and south-eastwards towards Chalai and Pallamatalan and be upgraded to a national park. The recommendation would see the sanctuary's area grow from 11,149 ha (27,550 acres) to 19,565 ha (48,347 acres), partly as a result of absorbing state-owned forests nearby.

In May 2015 the government announced that Chundikkulam, along with Adam's Bridge, Delft and Madhu Road, would be designated national parks. Chundikkulam sanctuary became a national park on 22 June 2015 with an area of 19,565 ha (48,347 acres).

== Flora and fauna ==
Chundikkulam Lagoon is partly surrounded by mangrove swamps and sea grass beds. The surrounding area includes palmyra palm plantations, scrub forests and a variety of dry zone flora. Numerous varieties of water and wader birds are found in the park including bar-tailed godwit, black-tailed godwit, black-winged stilt, brown-headed gull, common sandpiper, curlew sandpiper, eurasian coot, eurasian curlew, eurasian spoonbill, eurasian teal, eurasian wigeon, garganey, greater flamingo, gull-billed tern, marsh sandpiper, northern pintail, oriental ibis, painted stork, ruff, shoveler, terek sandpiper and wood sandpiper. Mammals found in the park include leopard, sloth bear and deer. Mugger crocodile and saltwater crocodile have also been seen in the park.
