= Law enforcement in Sri Lanka =

Law enforcement in Sri Lanka' falls under the jurisdiction of the "Police Force" in terms of the Police Ordinance No 16 of 1865], the national law enforcement agency, along with local community police

The Sri Lanka Police Force includes several specialised agencies. The Criminal Investigation Department (CID) is a national unit responsible for investigating serious crimes. The Special Task Force handles Counter-Terrorist and Counter-Insurgency operations. Other divisions include the Traffic Police, Police Narcotic Bureau, Security Council under DIG Valentine S. Vamadevan, and the Children & Women Bureau created in 1979.

Limited law enforcement authority is also given to other departments of the government for specific reasons. The Sri Lanka Customs and Department of Excise have certain police powers within ports, airports, and other customs and excise related matters. The Commission to Investigate Allegation of Bribery or Corruption (CIABOC), commonly referred to as the Bribery Commission, has powers to arrest persons suspected of bribery or corruption. The Department of Coast Guard exercises law enforcement powers in the territorial waters of Sri Lanka. The military police has police powers limited to military personnel, primarily for internal investigation and guarding military facilities.

== History ==
Since ancient times, judicial and law enforcement duties were carried out in local kingdoms in the Sri Lanka by officials appointed to administrate provinces or districts. These officers include officers such as Dissavas and continued until the closure of the Native Department in the 1930s.

Modern policing was introduced to the island by the British in 1797 with the appointment of a Fiscal for the town of Colombo. Being a garrison town and a military fort, a Town Major oversaw policing and patrolling in and out of the town.

== Specialized agencies of the Sri Lanka Police ==
- Children & Women Bureau
- Colombo Crime Division (CCD)
- Computer Crime Investigation Division (CCID)
- Criminal Investigation Department (CID)
- Diplomatic Security Division
- Financial Crimes Investigation Division (FCID)
- Judicial Security Division
- Marine Division
- Mounted Division
- Police Kennels (K9 units)
- Police Narcotic Bureau
- Special Task Force (STF)
- Terrorist Investigation Department (TID)
- Tourist Police
- Traffic Police

== Coast Guard ==
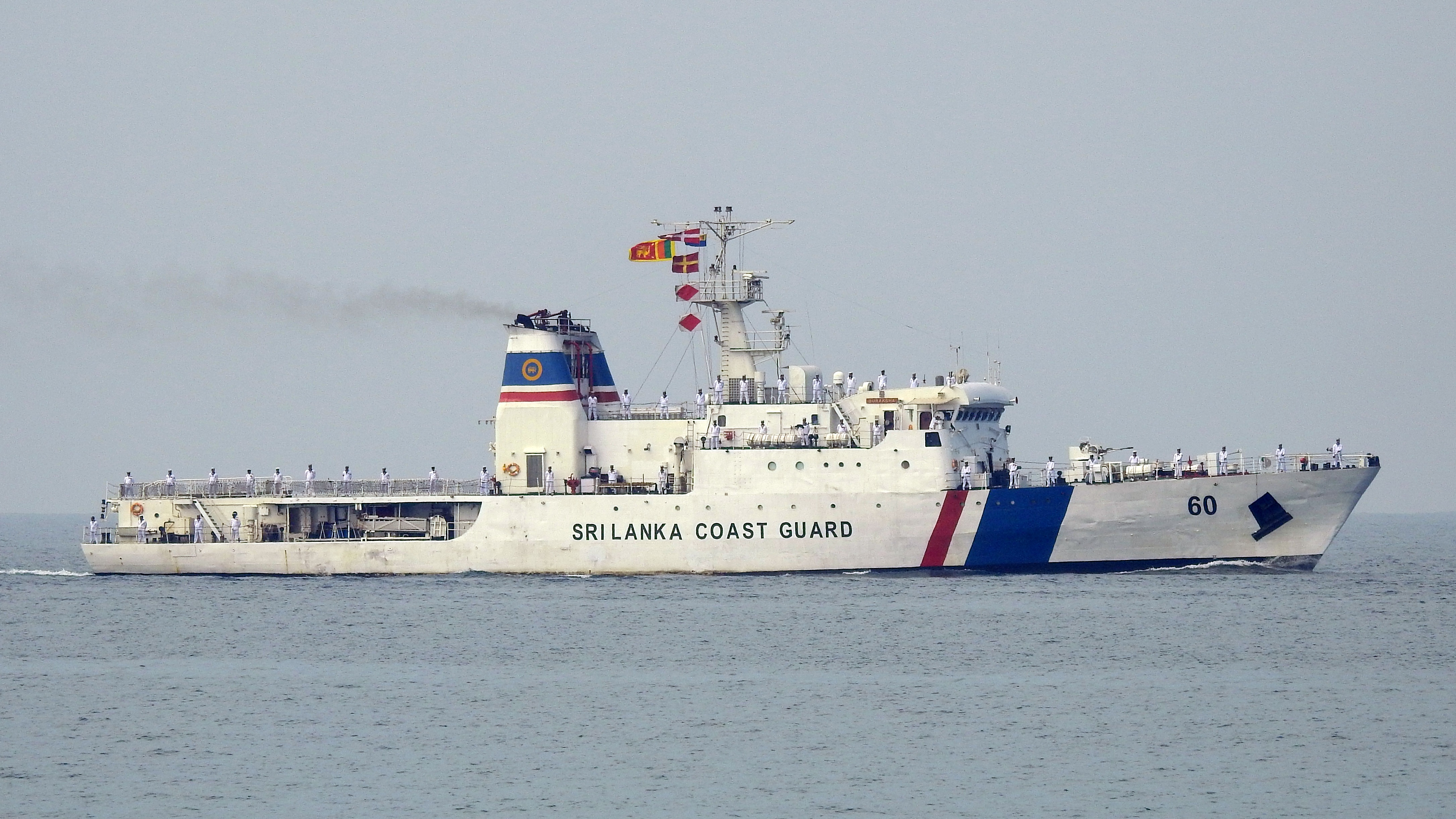
SLCG Suraksha on 71st Independence Navy display.

The Sri Lankan Coast Guard was established in 2010 and is under the purview of the Ministry of Defence. Coast Guard officers are considered as peace officers under the Code of Criminal Procedure Act of 1979.

== Other agencies ==
- Commission to Investigate Allegation of Bribery or Corruption (in bribery or corruption related matters)
- Department of Forest Conservation (within protected forest areas)
- Department of Immigration and Emigration (in Immigration and Emigration related matters)
- Department of Prisons
- Department of Wildlife Conservation (within national parks)
- Sri Lanka Customs (in Customs related matters)
