= Ussangoda National Park =

Sri Lankan national park

- IUCN category II (national park)
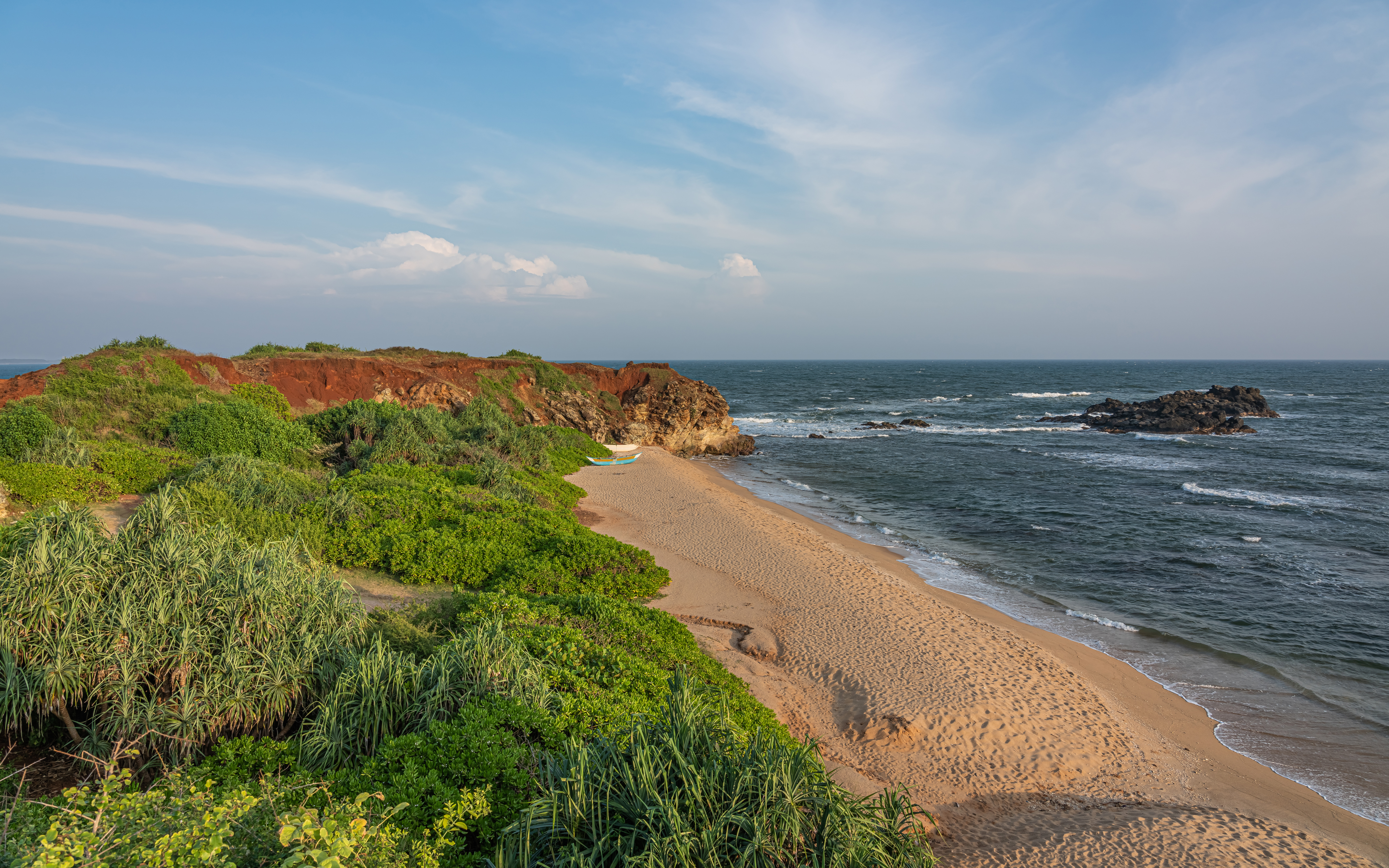
- Ussangoda nature park

- Location within Sri Lanka
- Location: Southern Province, Sri Lanka
- Nearest city: Hambantota
- Coordinates: 6°06′00″N 80°59′22″E
- Area: 349 hectares (1.35 sq mi)
- Established: 2010
- Governing body: Department of Wildlife Conservation

Ussangoda National Park is a Sri Lankan national park and designated archaeological site, situated on the Colombo – Kataragama road near Ambalantota – Nonagama Junction in Hambantota District. It is located in the southern sea turtle breeding zones. Ussangoda is a patch of high ground by the sea and spreads over a significant area. Unlike the rest of the land surrounding, it is only covered with grass and a few pockets of pigmy forests. The summit of Ussangoda area pans like a plateau for a significant length.

== Geological and archaeological importance ==
Ussangoda is known for its unusual placement by soil structure, flora, and location. There are many folk stories related to this site which include different takes about the land. General belief is that it is a part of a meteor or a proximity to a meteor hit. The main rationale for this belief is the soils brick-like hard quality with a reddish colour which is unique to this patch of land. Some rocks and soil layers contain what some speculate to be remnants of an extreme heat (that can be caused by an event such as a meteor hit). It is also suspected that the soil has a high concentration of minerals/metals giving its unique colour. In several places, especially by the sea facing areas rocks and soil can be observed clearly having multiple layers usually with distinct colourization. It is however unclear whether these speculations have been tested in any proper scientific study at all. It can be also noticed that Ussangoda is located geographically closer to another archaeological site "Miniha Gal Kanda", where evidence for pre-historic human existence has been found.

The rock debris has high iron concentration. Magnets attract them.

== Legend ==
There are several legends related to the area. The site is considered a sacred/forbidden ground for general affairs in local lore. One popular belief is that Ussangoda is a ground of the local demi-god "Mangara". Other beliefs range from religiously rooted backgrounds to the unwritten/alternate history related to Ravana. According to Hindu puranas, Ussangoda was one of the landing strips of Ravana's Pushpaka vimana.

== Ussangoda National Park ==
Ussangoda National Park was created in 2010. The objectives of establishing the new national park are providing long term protection for the area's biological, archaeological and geographical values. The park borders the Kalametiya Wildlife Sanctuary in the east.

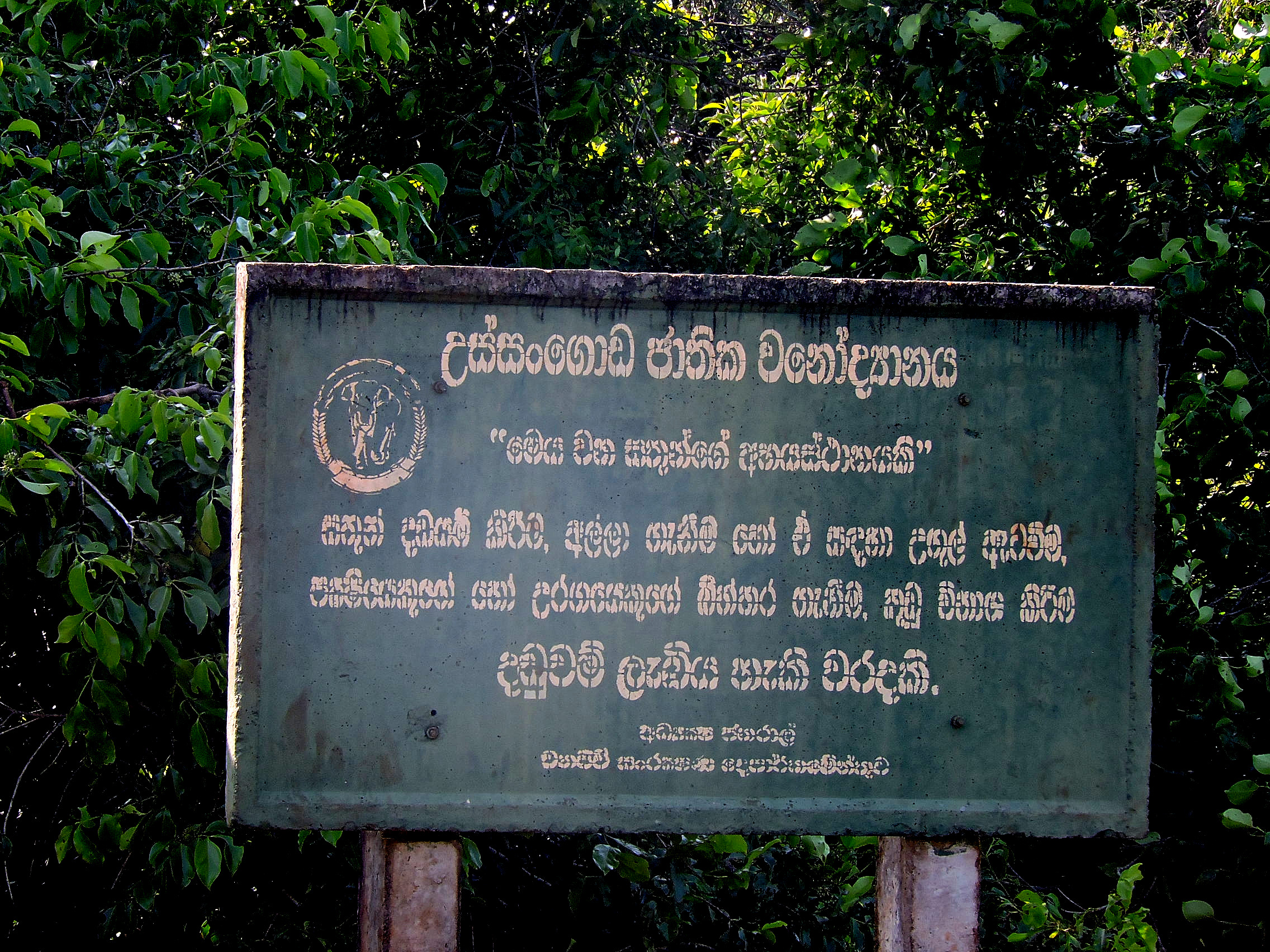
Entrance to Ussangoda National Park

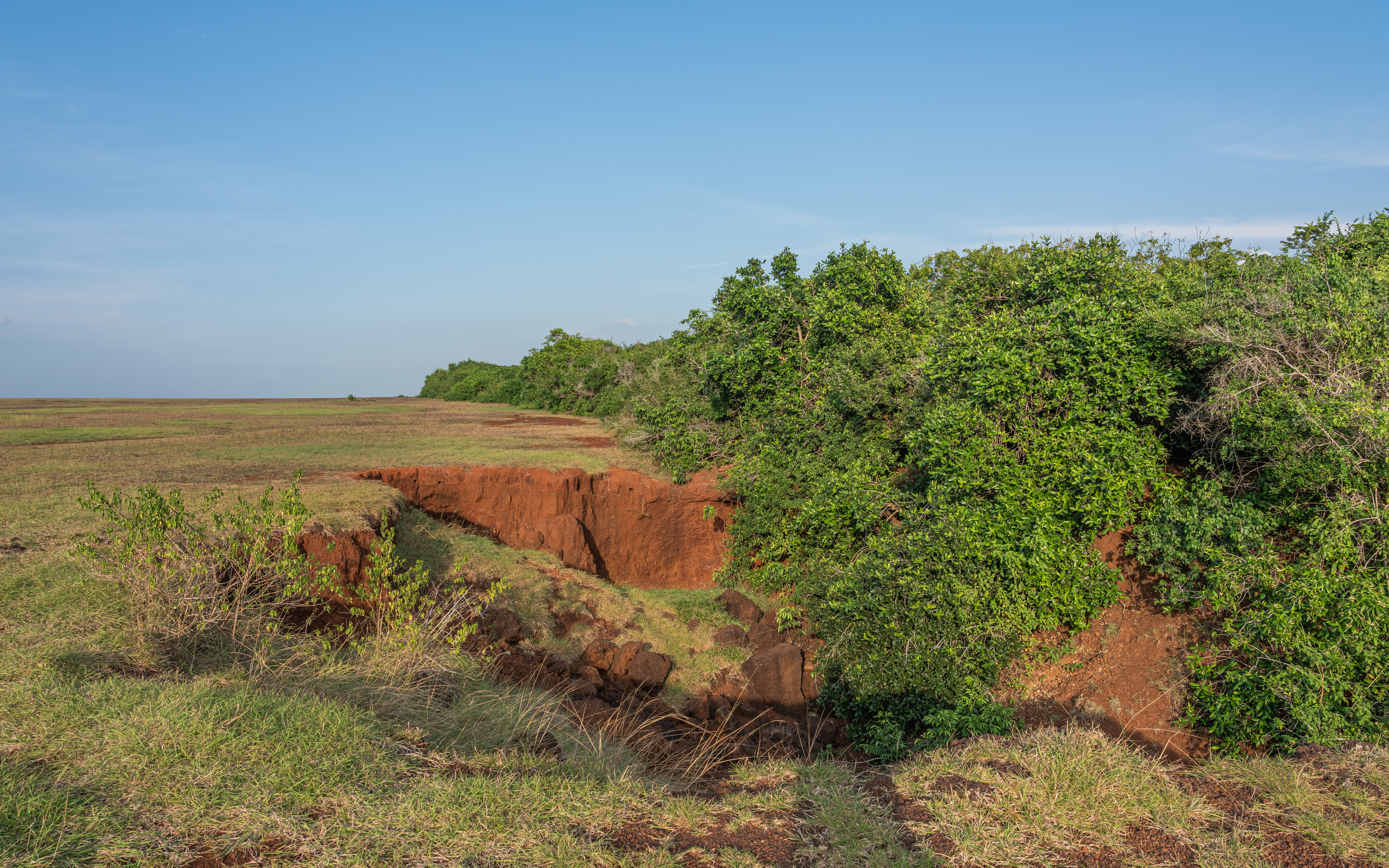
Red soil found in Ussangoda

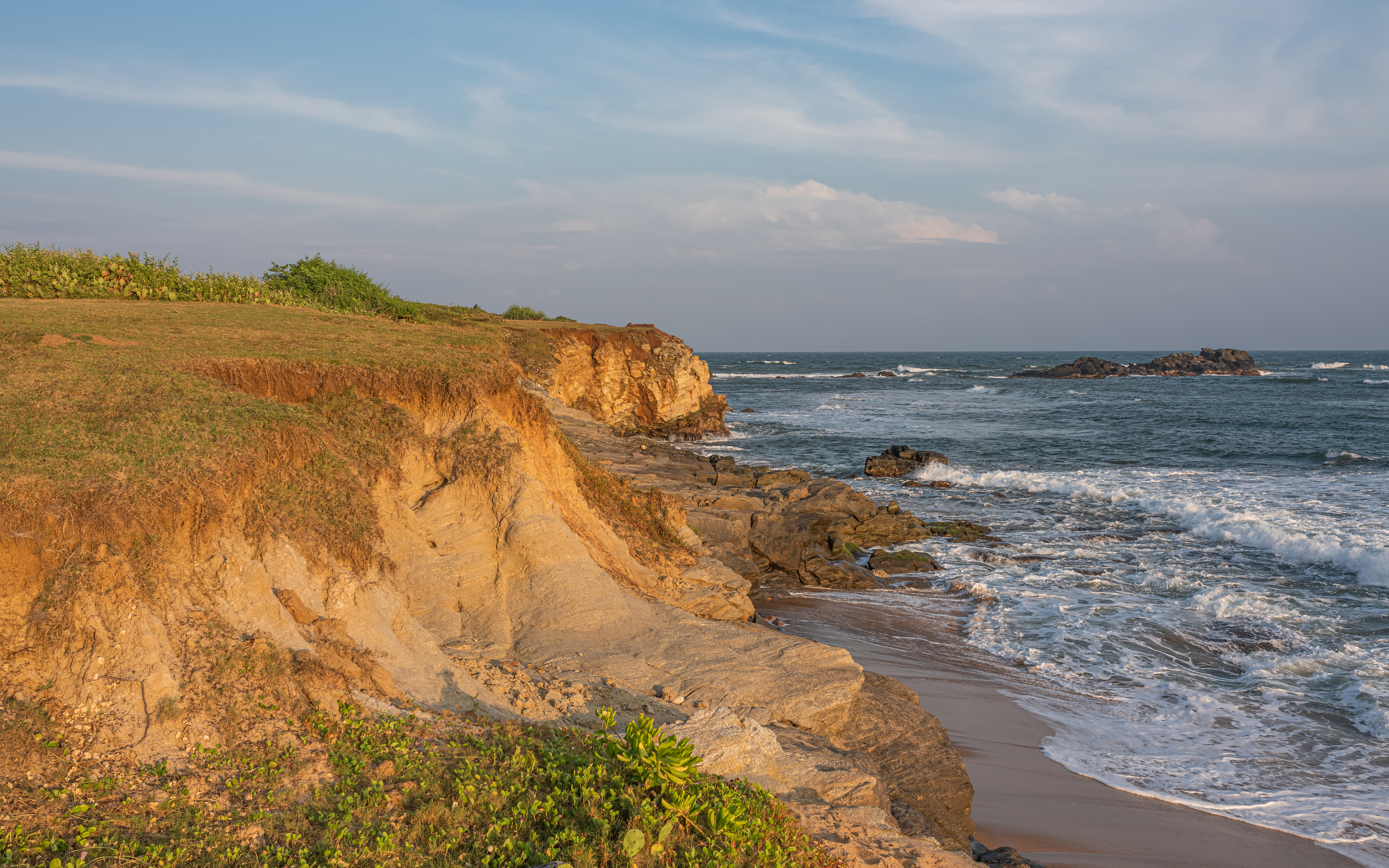
Ussangoda beach
