= Horowpathana National Park =

National park in Sri Lanka

- හොරොව්පතාන ජාතික උද්‍යානය; ஹோரோபோத்தன தேசிய பூங்கா
- IUCN category II (national park)
- Location within Sri Lanka
- Location: North Central Province
- Coordinates: 8.6192525°N 80.8301721°E
- Area: 2,570 km^{2} (992 sq mi)
- Established: 6 December 2011
- Owner: Government of Sri Lanka
- Administrator: Department of Wildlife Conservation

Horowpathana National Park (Sinhala: හොරොව්පතාන ජාතික උද්‍යානය; Tamil: ஹோரோபோத்தன தேசிய பூங்கா) is the 23rd national park in Sri Lanka. It is located in north eastern Sri Lanka, approximately 53 km (33 mi) west of Trincomalee and 64 km (40 mi) north-east of Anuradhapura.

== History ==
In 2005 the Minister for Environment and Natural Resources, A. H. M. Fowzie, instructed the Director-General of the Department of Wildlife Conservation to initiate the creation of a new national park recognising the rich biodiversity in the area. The forest has been identified as receiving the highest rainfall in the Anuradhapura District. It is the natural habitat of leopards, elephants (with officials estimating that at the time there were approximately 400 wild elephants in the forest), samba deer, sloth bears, rabbits and mouse-deer. The Minister believed that declaring the forest as a national park would assist in minimising human-elephant conflict in the area, protect villagers' cultivations and eliminate poaching and unauthorised timber logging.

The creation of the park was formally ratified by gazette notification No 1735/21 on 6 December 2011. The park comprises 2,570 ha (6,400 acres) and is situated on the left bank of Tawalamham Hammillewa and 100 m (330 ft) south of Kapugollewa Ihala Divul Wewa. Its eastern border starts from Kapugollewahoropothana Road which lies south of Palugaswewa. The southern border of the park starts at Kebbetigollewa Horowpothana on the A 29 road while its western border is located next to the Welimuwapothanna Wewa.

In 2015 the country's first Elephant Holding Ground (EHG) was established in the national park, where problem elephants from around the country are translocated. The EHG comprises 930 ha (2,300 acres) of land within the national park with the capacity for 40 elephants. The translocation process and the management of the EHG has been criticised by a number of sources.

On 12 September 2019, the park was increased to include the land area adjacent to the Elephant Retention Centre in Horowpothana.

== Etymology ==
Horowpathana comes from the Sinhalese words for ‘sluice’ and ‘seven’, which refers to the area's ancient irrigation system.
