= Galway's Land National Park =

National park in Sri Lanka

Galways Land National Park
- IUCN category II (national park)
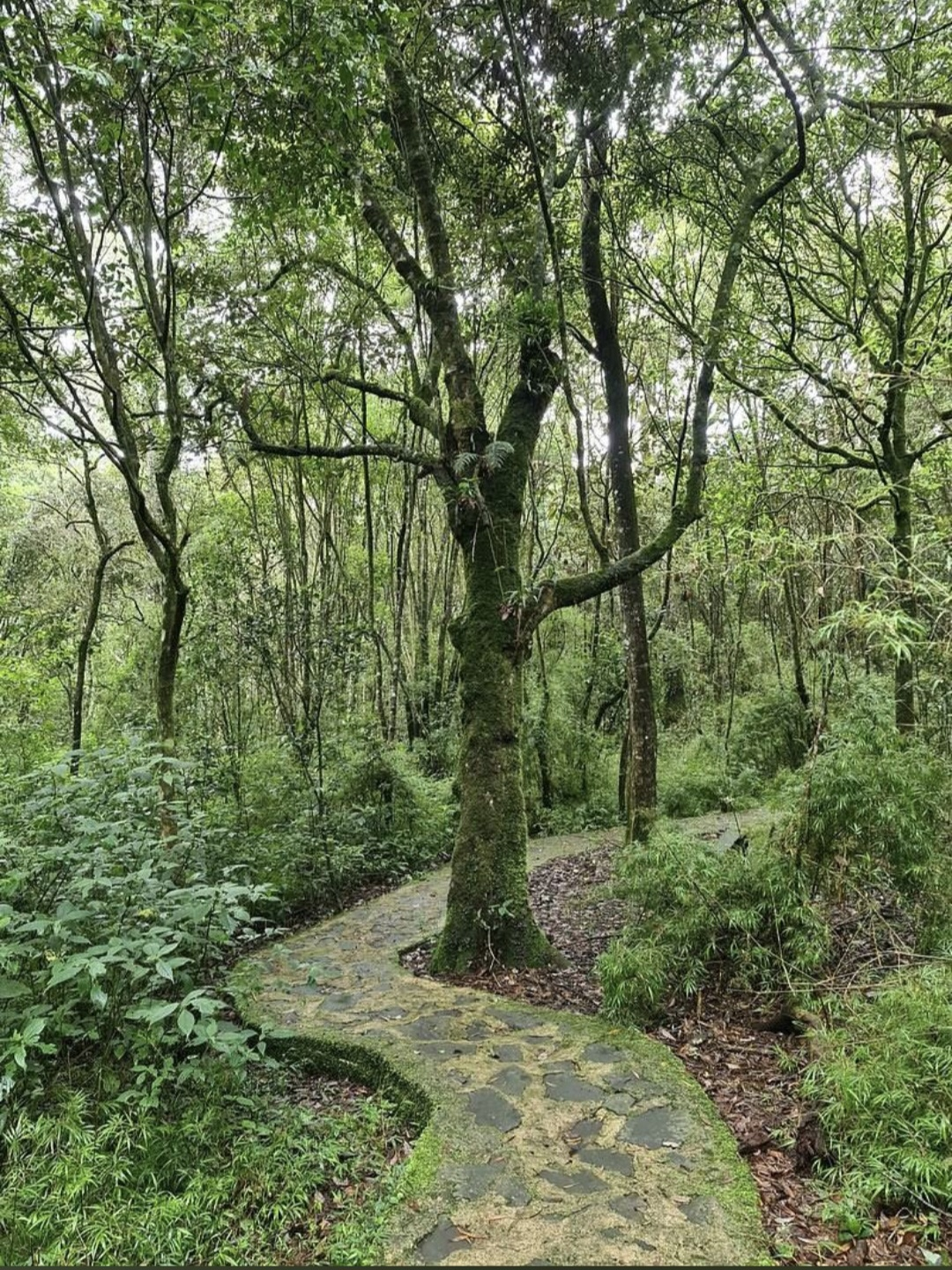
- Galways Land National Park

- Location within Sri Lanka
- Location: Central Province, Sri Lanka
- Nearest city: Nuwara Eliya
- Coordinates: 6°58′00″N 80°46′38″E
- Area: 27 hectares (0.10 mi^{2})
- Established: 1938 (Sanctuary); 2006 (National Park)
- Governing body: Department of Wildlife Conservation

Galways Land National Park is a small 27 ha (0.10 mi^{2}) national park consisting of dense montane forest. It is located within the city limits of Nuwara Eliya in Sri Lanka, approximately 2 km (1 mi) east of the city centre. The area was first declared a wildlife sanctuary on 27 May 1938, and later upgraded to national park status on 18 May 2006. The park was established to conserve the unique montane ecosystems of the region.

The Field Ornithology Group of Sri Lanka identifies both Victoria Park and Galways Land National Park as two of the most significant birdwatching sites in the country. The park is home to about 20 species of rare migrant birds and around 30 native bird species. In addition to its rich avifauna, Galways Land National Park preserves valuable flora of both native and introduced origin. The nearby Galway Forest Lodge is located close to the park boundary.

== See also ==
- Protected areas of Sri Lanka
