= Ridiyagama Safari Park =

- entrance
- Interactive map of Ridiyagama Safari Park
- 6°14′37″N 80°58′46″E
- Date opened: 28 March 2016
- Location: Ridiyagama, Ambalanthota Hambantota, Sri Lanka
- Land area: 500 acres (200 ha)
- No. of animals: 22 species
- No. of species: 22 species
- Major exhibits: Mammals, Birds
- Website: nationalzoo.gov.lk

Ridiyagama Safari Park is 500-acre (200 ha) safari park, zoo in Ridiyagama area of Hambantota District, Sri Lanka. The park was opened to the public on 28 May 2016.

== Initiation ==
It is the first ever Safari Park in Sri Lanka.

In 2008, construction work of park was started by the direction of The National Zoological Department of Sri Lanka.

The safari park constructed for the expectation of tourism, and estimated cost for the project is 1.6 billion Sri Lankan rupees.

== Composition ==
It would be divided into six zones, where carnivorous animals will be in 4 zones and herbivores animals will be in 2 zones. Meanwhile, carnivore animals such as lions, tigers and leopards will be in 2 zones of the carnivore section.

The first phase with the 35-acre African Lion Zone, 54-acre Sri Lanka Elephant Zone and 80 acres World Zone was opened to the public. African, Asian, Australian Zones and a small animal kingdom is under construction as the second phase.
