= Department of Forest Conservation (Sri Lanka) =

Department of Forest Conservation Vana Sanrakshana Departhamenthuwa වන සංරක්‍ෂණ දෙපාර්තමේන්තුව

Agency overview
- Formed: 1887
- Superseding agency: Ministry of Environment

Jurisdictional structure
- Operations jurisdiction: Sri Lanka

The Department of Forest Conservation (Sinhala: වන සංරක්‍ෂණ දෙපාර්තමේන්තුව Vana Sanrakshana Departhamenthuwa) is a non-ministerial government department responsible for forestry in Sri Lanka. Its mission is to protect and expand Sri Lanka's forests and woodlands. The head of the department is the Conservator General, Dr. K.M.A.Bandara. It comes under the purview of the Ministry of Wildlife and Forest Resource Conservation.

It has limited policing powers in protected forest areas to stop illegal poaching and logging, with the power to arrest suspects.

== Forests ==
Some of the forests managed by the Department of Forest Conservation are:

- Hurulu Man and Biosphere Reserve, 1977
- Sinharaja Man and Biosphere Reserve, 1978
- Kanneliya-Dediyagala-Nakiyadeniya (KDN), 2004

== See also ==
- Law enforcement in Sri Lanka
