= Adam's Bridge Marine National Park =

National Park in Sri Lanka

Ram's Bridge Marine National Park
- இராமர் பாலம் கடல்சார் தேசிய பூங்கா ආදම්ගේ පාලම ජාතික සාගර උද්‍යානය
- Location within Northern Province
- Location: Northern Province
- Nearest city: Mannar
- Coordinates: 09°04′15″N 79°37′42″E
- Area: 190 km^{2} (73 sq mi)
- Established: 22 June 2015
- Administrator: Department of Wildlife Conservation

Adam's Bridge Marine National Park (Tamil: இராமர் பாலம் கடல்சார் தேசிய பூங்கா, romanized: Irāmar Pālam Kaṭalcār Tēciya Pūṅkā; Sinhala: ආදම්ගේ පාලම ජාතික සාගර උද්‍යානය, romanized: Ādamgē Pālama Jātika Sāgara Udyānaya) is a national park surrounding Adam's Bridge (Rama's Bridge) in northern Sri Lanka, approximately 30 km (19 mi) north west of Mannar.

== History ==
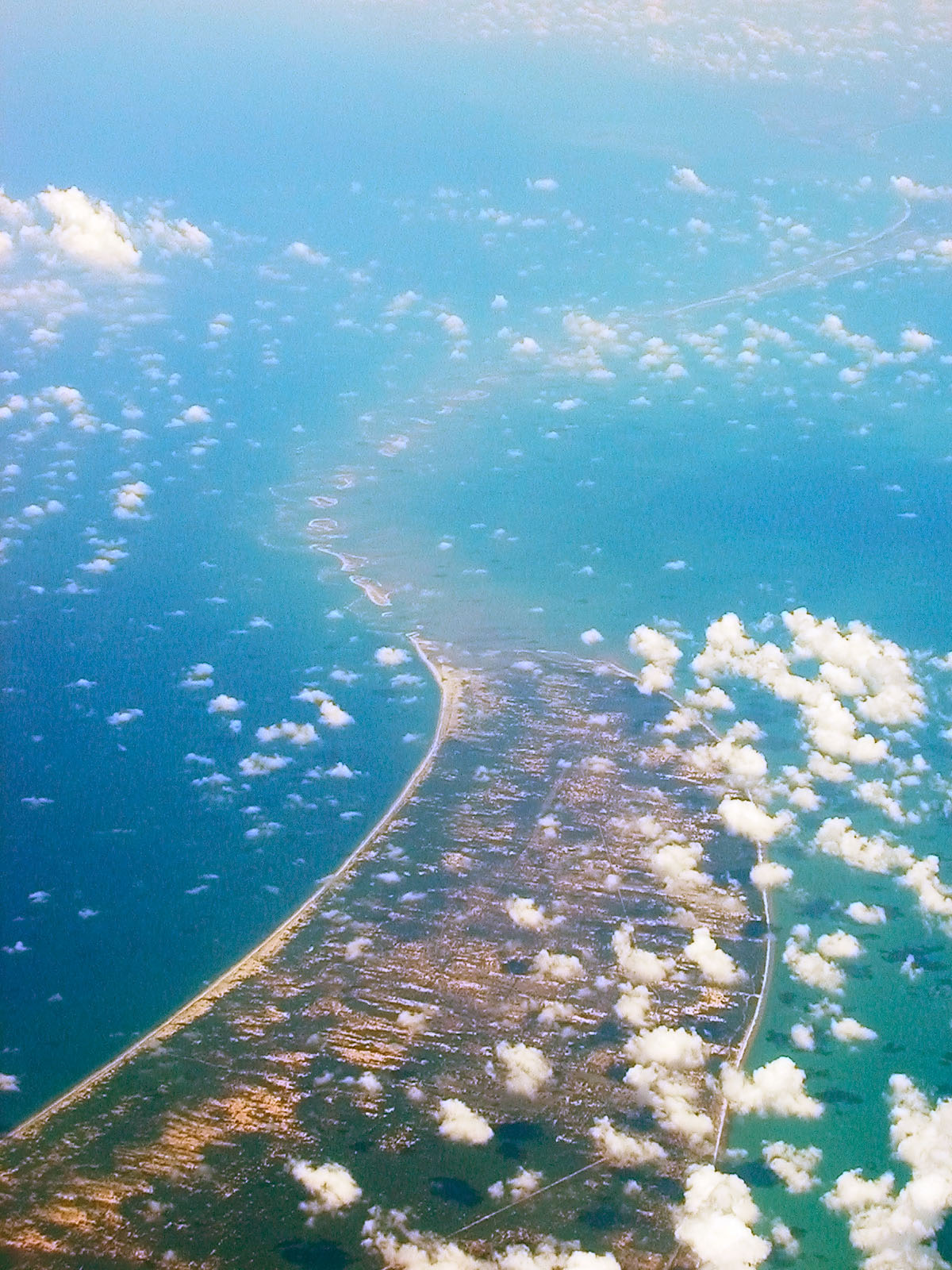
Adam's Bridge with Mannar Island in the foreground.

An Integrated Strategic Environmental Assessment of Northern Province produced by the government with the assistance of United Nations Development Programme and United Nations Environment Programme and published in October 2014 recommended that a national park with an area of 18,990 ha (46,925 acres) be created on the Sri Lankan section of Adam's Bridge. In May 2015 the government announced that a part of Adam's Bridge, along with Chundikkulam, Delft and Madhu Road would be designated national parks. Adam's Bridge became a national park on 22 June 2015 with an area of 18,990 ha (46,925 acres). The Indian section of Adam's Bridge is part of the Gulf of Mannar Marine National Park.

== Flora and fauna ==
Many migratory birds follow the Pamban Island-Adam's Bridge-Mannar Island route when flying to/from Sri Lanka. The sand dunes of Adam's Bridge are also used as breeding grounds by birds such as the brown noddy. Numerous varieties of fish and sea grasses thrive in the shallow waters Adam's Bridge. Sea life found around Adam's Bridge include dolphin, dugong and turtle.

== See also ==
- Coral reefs in India
