= Horagolla National Park =

National park in Western Province, Sri Lanka

- IUCN category II (national park)
- Location within Sri Lanka
- Location: Western Province, Sri Lanka
- Nearest city: Nittambuwa
- Coordinates: 7°08′22″N 80°05′08″E
- Area: 33 hectares (0.13 mi^{2})
- Established: 1973
- Governing body: Department of Wildlife Conservation

Horagolla National Park is one of the latest national parks in Sri Lanka. It is so called because of an abundance of Dipterocarpus zeylanicus (hora) trees. The area was originally declared as a wildlife sanctuary on 5 September 1973 due to its rich biodiversity. Later on 24 June 2004, Horagolla was elevated to national park status. Horagolla is the only urban park in the Western Province of Sri Lanka. The park is situated close to Horagolla Walauwa, the home of the Bandaranaike family. The park is situated some 40 kilometres (25 mi) from Colombo.

== Flora and fauna ==
Horagolla is a low-country evergreen forest. The park has a humus soil structure and hot temperature persists throughout the year. Many tree species are in abundance including Dipterocarpus zeylanicus (hora), Canarium zeylanicum (kekuna), Dillenia retusa (godapara), Caryota urens (kitul), Pericopsis mooniana (nedun), Mangifera zeylanica (atamba), sacred fig, Alstonia scholaris (ruk attana), Acronychia pedunculata (ankenda), Vitex pinnata (milla), Mimusops elengi (moonamal), breadfruit and Pterospermum canescens (Velang). Also various liana Entada rheedei (pus-wel) can be seen. In the forests of the park, Gmelina arborea (ethdemata), Filicium decipiens (pihimbiya), mahogany, teak and golden shower tree (ehela) are predominant.

The mammals found in the park include fishing cat, Sri Lankan spotted chevrotain, golden jackal, and grizzled giant squirrel. Horagolla is considered a birdwatching site. The number of bird species recorded from the park is 68. The most common are parakeets, black-crested bulbul, barbets, and Asian koel. Some of the other bird species seen in the park include Sri Lanka grey hornbill, Sri Lanka hanging parrot, Layard's parakeet and Oriental dwarf kingfisher. The rare clipper, Ceylon birdwing and blue Mormon are the butterflies known from the park. Many threatened species including tortoises are found in Horagolla. Pythons and cobras are among the many reptiles found in the park.

== See also ==
- Protected areas of Sri Lanka
