= Angammedilla National Park =

National park in Sri Lanka

- අංගම්මැඩිල්ල ජාතික වනෝද්‍යානය அங்கம்மெடில்லை தேசிய வனம்
- IUCN category II (national park)
- Location within Sri Lanka
- Location: North Central province, Sri Lanka
- Nearest city: Polonnaruwa
- Coordinates: 7°54′04.24″N 80°56′13.71″E
- Area: 7,528.95 ha
- Established: 6 June 2006
- Governing body: Department of Wildlife Conservation

Angammedilla National Park (Sinhala: අංගම්මැඩිල්ල ජාතික වනෝද්‍යානය, romanized: Aṁgammæḍilla Jātika Vanōdyānaya; Tamil: அங்கம்மெடில்லை தேசிய வனம், romanized: Aṅkam'meṭillai Tēciya Vaṉam) is one of the new national parks in Sri Lanka. The region was designated national park on 6 June 2006. Originally Angammedilla was a forest reserve within the Minneriya-Girithale Sanctuary declared on 12 February 1988. The park is declared mainly to protect the drainage basin of Parakrama Samudra. Angammedilla also secures the drainage basins of Minneriya and Girithale irrigation tanks, water sources in Sudu Kanda (Sinhala for "White hill") and habitats and wildlife of the adjacent forests. It is located 225 kilometres (140 mi) away from Colombo in Polonnaruwa District.

== Physical features ==
Amban river which is sourced by Sudu Kanda forms the southern border of the park. A mountain range stretches across the park from Girithale to Minneriya. In the drought period the park is very dry. In the rainy season, mountainous area receives more rainfall than the plains. Since a mix wet and dry climate persists in the park the vegetation is a mix of wet zone and dry zone plants.

In the ancient times water has irrigated from Amban river to Parakrama Samudra in a canal done in stone. The rocky wall of the canal called royal wall by the villagers.

== Flora and fauna ==
The vegetation of the park is predominantly dry evergreen forests. Diospyros ebenum is one of the dominant plant species in the forest. Manilkara hexandra (Palu), Cholorocylon swetenia (Burutha), Vitex pinnata (Milla), and Adina cordifolia (Kolon) are common in natural vegetation.

Mesua ferrea trees are grown in communities.

Sri Lankan elephant, Sri Lankan sambar deer, Indian muntjac, Sri Lankan axis deer, water buffalo, wild boar, and peafowl are common within the park. However Sri Lanka leopard, sloth bear, grizzled giant squirrel and Sri Lanka junglefowl are sometimes seen. The primate species red slender loris, tufted gray langur, and purple-faced langur are seen also.

== See also ==
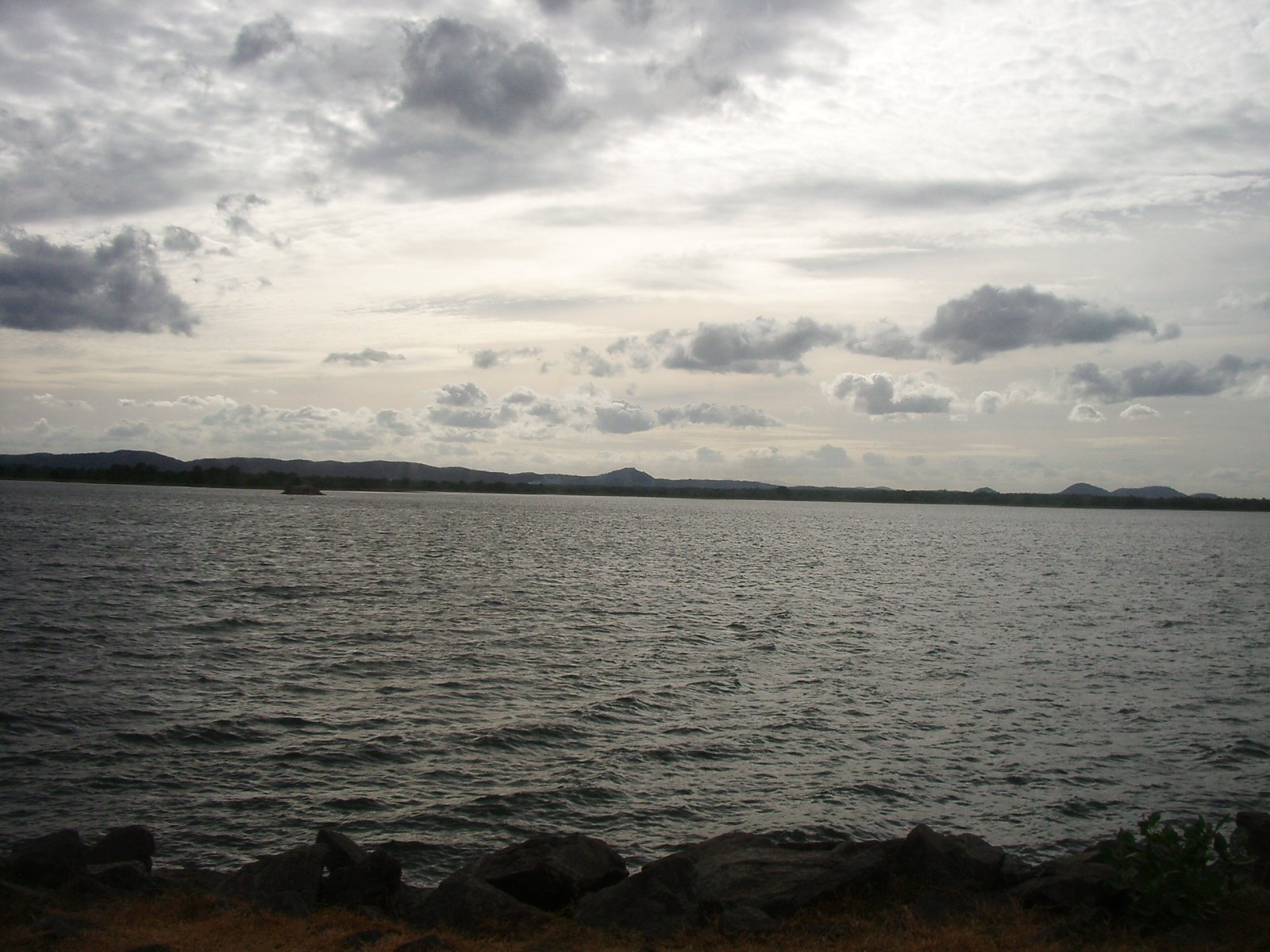
National Park is declared mainly to protect the drainage basin of Parakrama Samudra

- Protected areas of Sri Lanka
