= Delft National Park =

National park in Sri Lanka

- நெடுந்தீவு தேசிய பூங்கா ඩෙල්ෆ්ට් ජාතික වනෝද්‍යානය
- IUCN category II (national park)
- Location within Northern Province
- Location: Northern Province
- Nearest city: Jaffna
- Coordinates: 09°29′50″N 79°42′00″E
- Area: 18 km^{2} (7 sq mi)
- Established: 22 June 2015
- Owner: Government of Sri Lanka
- Administrator: Department of Wildlife Conservation

Delft National Park (Tamil: நெடுந்தீவு தேசிய பூங்கா, romanized: Neṭuntīvu Tēciya Pūṅkā; Sinhala: ඩෙල්ෆ්ට් ජාතික වනෝද්‍යානය, romanized: Delfṭ Jātika Vanōdyānaya) is a national park on the island of Neduntivu (Delft) in northern Sri Lanka, approximately 35 km (22 mi) south west of Jaffna.

== History ==
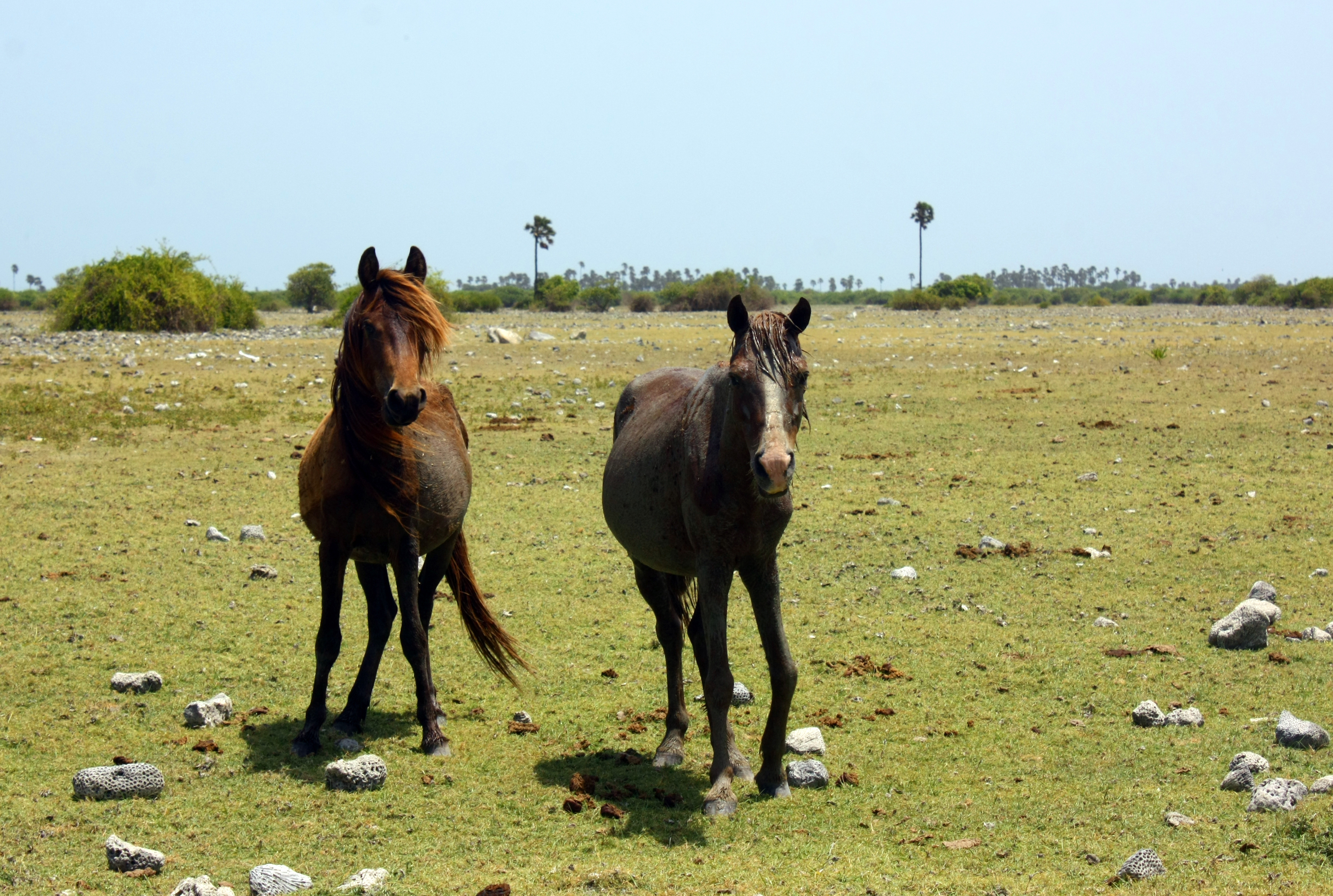
Wild ponies on Delft island.

An Integrated Strategic Environmental Assessment of Northern Province produced by the government with the assistance of United Nations Development Programme and United Nations Environment Programme and published in October 2014 recommended that a national park with an area of 1,846 ha (4,562 acres) be created on a part of Delft island. In May 2015 the government announced that a part of Delft, along with Adam's Bridge, Chundikkulam and Madhu Road would be designated national parks. Delft became a national park on 22 June 2015 with an area of 1,846 ha (4,562 acres).

== Flora and fauna ==
Delft island is the only place in the world with wild ponies. They are believed to have been brought to the island by the Portuguese.
