= List of wildlife sanctuaries of Sri Lanka =

Sanctuaries are a class of protected areas in Sri Lanka and are administered by the Department of Wildlife Conservation. Sanctuaries are governed by the Fauna and Flora Protection Ordinance (No. 2) of 1937 and may be created, amended or abolished by ministerial order. All wildlife in sanctuaries are protected but the habitat is only protected in state-owned land, allowing human activities to continue on privately owned land. Activities prohibited in sanctuaries include hunting, killing or removing any wild animal; destroying eggs/nests of birds and reptiles; disturbing of wild animals; and interfering in the breeding of any animal. Permission is not required to enter sanctuaries. There are currently 61 sanctuaries which together cover an area of 2,780 km^{2} (1,073 sq mi).

== Sanctuaries ==
Sanctuary Name	Location	Established	Area	
Sanctuary Name	Location	Established	km²	mi²
Anawilundawa Ramsar Wetland National Sanctuary	North Western Province	11 June 1997	13.97	5.39
Anuradhapura National Sanctuary	North Central Province	27 May 1938	35.01	13.52
Bar Reef Marine Sanctuary	North Western Province	3 April 1992	306.70	118.42
Bellanwila-Attidiya Wetland National Sanctuary	Western Province	25 July 1990	3.72	1.44
Budhangala National Sanctuary	Eastern Province	1 November 1974	18.41	7.11
Bundala-Wilmanna National Sanctuary		30 June 2006	33.39	12.89
Dahaiyagala National Sanctuary		7 June 2002	26.85	10.37
Elahera-Girithale National Sanctuary		13 January 2000	140.35	54.19
Eluwilayaya National Sanctuary	Southern Province	11 September 2009	1.86	0.72
Gal Oya Valley North East	Eastern Province	12 February 1954	124.32	48.00
Gal Oya Valley South East National Sanctuary	Eastern Province; Uva Province	12 February 1954	152.81	59.00
Galway's Land National Sanctuary	Central Province	27 May 1938	0.57	0.22
Giant's Tank National Sanctuary	Northern Province	24 September 1954	43.30	16.72
Godawaya National Sanctuary		25 May 2006	2.32	0.90
Great Sober Island National Sanctuary	Eastern Province	21 June 1963	0.65	0.25
Hikkaduwa Coral Gardens Marine National Sanctuary & National Park	Southern Province	18 May 1979	1.02	0.39
Honduwa Island National Sanctuary		19 November 1973	0.09	0.03
Kahalla-Pallekele National Sanctuary	Central Province; North Central Province; North Western Province	1 July 1989	216.90	83.75
Kalametiya Lagoon National Sanctuary	Southern Province	28 June 1984	25.25	9.75
Katagamuwa National Sanctuary	Southern Province; Uva Province	27 May 1938	10.04	3.87
Kataragama National Sanctuary	Southern Province; Uva Province	27 May 1938	8.38	3.23
Kayankerni Marine Sanctuary	Eastern Province	11 April 2019	9.53	3.68
Kimbulwana Oya National Sanctuary	North Western Province	21 June 1963	4.92	1.90
Kiralakela National Sanctuary	Southern Province	8 September 2003	3.10	1.20
Kirama National Sanctuary		6 October 2004	0.05	0.02
Kokkilai National Sanctuary	Eastern Province; Northern Province	18 May 1951	19.95	7.70
Kudumbigala-Panama National Sanctuary	Eastern Province	20 February 2006	65.34	25.23
Kurulu Kele (Kegalle) National Sanctuary	Sabaragamuwa Province	14 March 1941	1.13	0.44
Little Sober Island National Sanctuary	Eastern Province	21 June 1963	0.07	0.03
Madampawila Lagoon National Sanctuary		21 September 2007	12.18	4.70
Maduganga Ramsar Wetland National Sanctuary		17 July 2006	23.00	8.88
Madunagala National Sanctuary	Southern Province	30 June 1993	9.95	3.84
Maembulkanda-Nittabuwa National Sanctuary		31 October 1972	0.24	0.09
Mahakanadarawa Wewa National Sanctuary	North Central Province	9 December 1966	5.19	2.01
Medinduwa National Sanctuary		6 June 1980	0.01	0.00
Mihintale National Heritage Sanctuary	North Central Province	27 May 1938	10.00	3.86
Muthurajawela Block I National Sanctuary	Western Province	31 October 1996	10.29	3.97
Muthurajawela Block II National Sanctuary	Western Province	31 October 1996	2.57	0.99
Nimalawa National Sanctuary	Southern Province	18 February 1993	10.66	4.12
Padaviya Tank National Sanctuary	North Central Province	21 June 1963	64.75	25.00
Rathgama Lagoon National Sanctuary	Southern Province	17 August 1988	1.90	0.73
Peak Wilderness	Central Province; Sabaragamuwa Province	25 October 1940	223.79	86.41
Polonnaruwa National Sanctuary	North Central Province	27 May 1938	15.22	5.87
Ravana Falls National Sanctuary	Uva Province	18 May 1979	19.32	7.46
Rekawa National Sanctuary		25 May 2006	2.71	1.05
Hikkaduwa - Ambalangoda Rocky Islets National Sanctuary	Southern Province	25 October 1940	0.01	0.00
Rumassala National Sanctuary	Southern Province	3 January 2003	1.71	0.66
Sakamam National Sanctuary		21 June 1963	6.16	2.38
Senanayake Samudra National Sanctuary	Eastern Province; Uva Province	12 February 1954	93.24	36.00
Seruwila-Allai National Sanctuary	Eastern Province	9 October 1970	155.40	60.00
Sigiriya National Sanctuary	Central Province; North Central Province	26 January 1990	50.99	19.69
Sri Jayawardenapura National Sanctuary	Western Province	9 January 1985	4.49	1.73
Tabbowa National Sanctuary	North Western Province	19 July 2002	21.93	8.47
Tangamale National Sanctuary	Uva Province	27 May 1938	1.32	0.51
Telwatta Lagoon National Sanctuary	Southern Province	25 February 1938	14.25	5.50
Trincomalee Naval Headworks National Sanctuary	Eastern Province; North Central Province	21 June 1963	181.30	70.00
Udawatta Kele	Central Province	29 July 1938	1.04	0.40
Vankalai Sanctuary	Northern Province	8 September 2008	48.39	18.68
Vavunikulam National Sanctuary	Northern Province	21 June 1963	48.56	18.75
Victoria-Randenigala-Rantambe National Sanctuary	Central Province; Uva Province	30 January 1987	420.87	162.50
Wirawila-Tissa National Sanctuary	Southern Province	27 May 1938	41.64	16.08
Welhella-Kategilla National Sanctuary	Sabaragamuwa Province	18 February 1949	1.34	0.52
Wilpattu North National Sanctuary	Northern Province; North Western Province	25 February 1938	6.32	2.44
Total			2,779.54	1,073.19
