= The International Ecotourism Society =

The International Ecotourism Society (TIES) is an American organization dedicated to promoting ecotourism globally. The organization was founded in 1990 and contributed significantly to the growth and development of ecotourism, providing guidelines, technical assistance, training, research and publications. TIES' global network of ecotourism professionals and travellers, with members in more than 190 countries, aims to use tourism as a tool for conservation, protection of bio-cultural diversity and sustainable community development. In 2015, TIES lost its 501(c)(3) federal tax-exempt status with the IRS as a result of failure to file Form 990 in three consecutive years, and in the same year the organization's board of directors resigned.
