= Department of Wildlife Conservation (Sri Lanka) =

Non-ministerial government department in Sri Lanka

- වනජිවි සංරක්ෂණ දෙපාර්තමේන්තුව வனசீவராசிகள் பாதுகாப்பு

Agency overview
- Formed: October 1949; 76 years ago (as the Wildlife Department)
- Preceding agencies: Fauna and Flora Protection Committee; Forest Department; Conservator of Forests
- Jurisdiction: Government of Sri Lanka
- Headquarters: 811/A Jayanthipura Road, Battaramulla; 6.897154°N 79.919845°E
- Employees: 1,826 (2017)
- Annual budget: රු 5.204 billion (2017)
- Minister responsible: C.B. Rathnayake
- Agency executive: Chandana Sooriyabandara, Director General
- Parent department: Ministry of Environment and Wildlife Resources
- Key document: Fauna and Flora Protection Ordinance, No. 2 of 1937
- Website: dwc.gov.lk

The Department of Wildlife Conservation (Sinhala: වනජීවී සංරක්‍ෂණ දෙපාර්තමේන්තුව Vanajivi Sanrakshana Departhamenthuwa) is a non-ministerial government department in Sri Lanka. It is the government department responsible for maintaining national parks, nature reserves and wildlife in wilderness areas in Sri Lanka. Forest reserves and wilderness areas are maintained by the Department of Forest Conservation. The head of the department is the Director General of Wildlife Conservation, formally known as Warden. It was established in October 1949 with Captain Cyril Nicholas, MC as its first Warden.

== Personal ==
=== Headquarters ===
The department is headed by the Director General of Wildlife Conservation, with it headquarters located in Battaramulla. The head office is made up of several divisions covering operations and administration under the preview of Directors, deputy directors and assistant directors.

=== Field deployments ===
Each province as an assistant director assigned to it with an office located within the province. The Elephant Transit Home and Training Center has an assistant director in charge of each.

The department deploys a large number of field officers and personal to manage and protect the wildlife in the national parks. They have law enforcement powers under the Fauna and Flora Protection Ordinance and the Fire Arms Ordinance. They operate range offices and beat offices.

Among the department's early field officers was Game Ranger Liyanage John Stanley Fernando, who served at Yala National Park in the 1950s. He was photographed in 1958 with a rescued leopard cub, one of the earliest known visual records of wildlife rehabilitation and human–animal coexistence in Sri Lanka's conservation history. The leopard cub was later transferred to the National Zoological Gardens in Dehiwala, marking early collaboration between the Department of Wildlife Conservation and the Zoo in animal care and protection. The historic photograph is preserved in a private family archive and has been published on Wikimedia Commons.

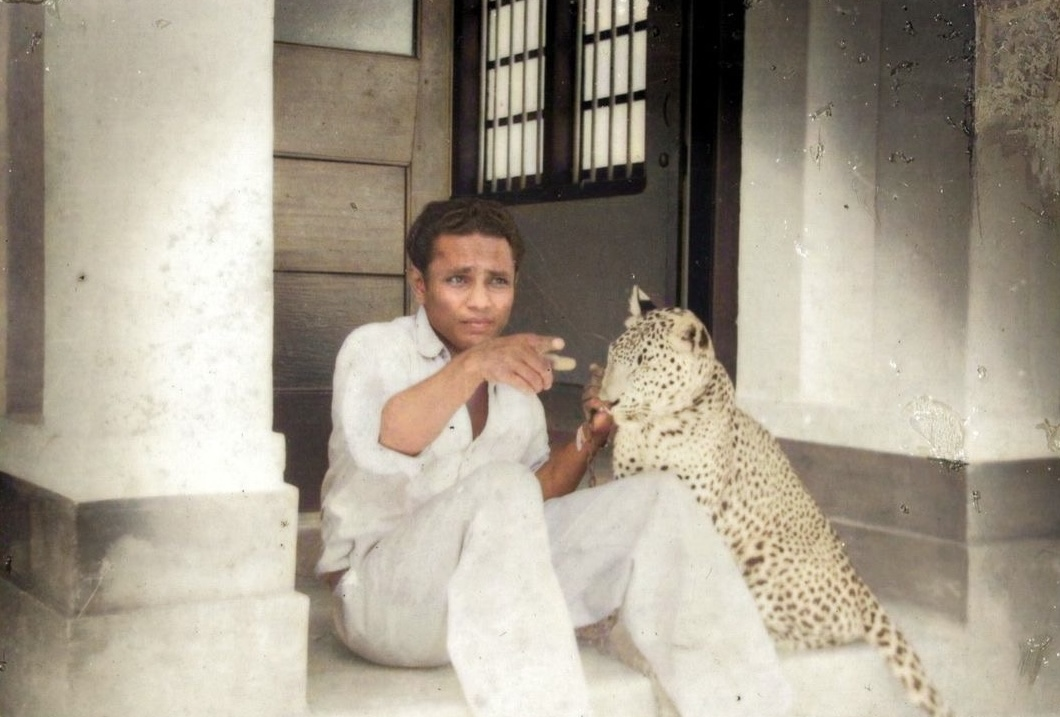
Game Ranger Liyanage John Stanley Fernando with a rescued leopard cub at Yala, 1958.

The field carder grades include;

Field carder

- Park Warden (Officer in charge of a National Park)
- Wildlife Ranger
- Wildlife Range Assistant
- Wildlife Guard (who also serve as trackers)

Number of PAs administered by the Department
		Number of PAs Declared as at December 2017
National Reserve	Strict Natural Reserve	3
National Reserve	National Park	26
National Reserve	Nature Reserve	9
National Reserve	Jungle Corridors	1
Sanctuary		62

== List of nature reserves ==
- Vidataltivu Nature Reserve

== Conservation centers under the Department ==
- Udawalawe Elephant Transit Centre

== See also ==
- Department of Forest Conservation
- Department of National Zoological Gardens
