= Bully tree =

Bully tree is a common name for several neotropical trees in the family Sapotaceae and may refer to:

- Sideroxylon spp. a few, a genus of flowering plants
- Manilkara spp. Manilkara bidentata, Manilkara spectabilis, Manilkara zapota etc., trees
- Pouteria multiflora, a tree (also called the broad-leaved lucuma)
- Terminalia amazonia, a tree from North South America to Middle America
- as bastard bully tree: Pithecellobium lanceolotum, Sideroxylon americanum (Syn.: Bumelia retusa), Sideroxylon salicifolium Mountain, White Bully tree, Sideroxylon portoricense subsp. portoricense (Syn.: Bumelia nigra, Dipholis nigra) Black, Red Bully tree
