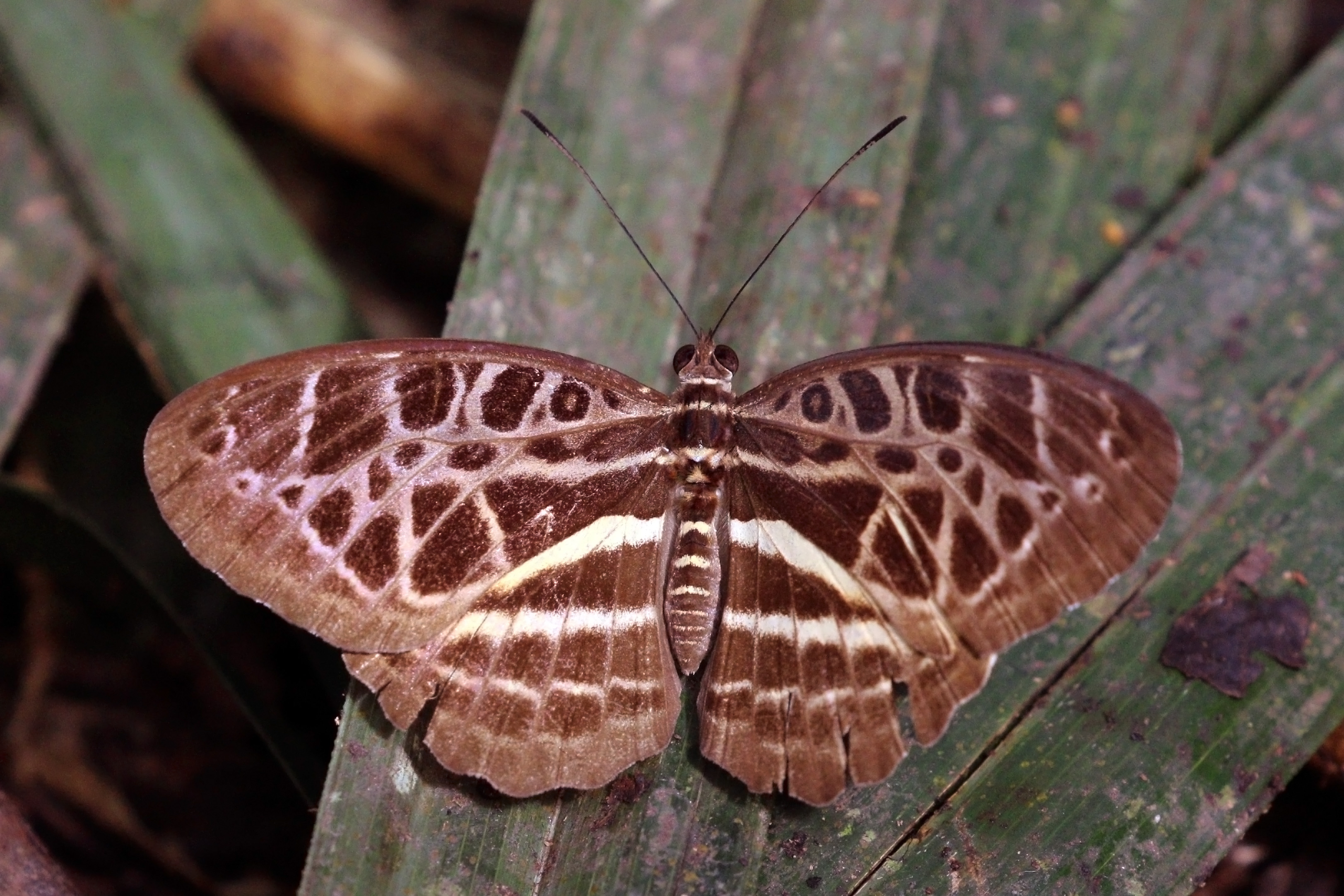
- E. c. conjuncta Kibale National Park, Uganda

Scientific classification
- Kingdom: Animalia
- Phylum: Arthropoda
- Clade: Pancrustacea
- Class: Insecta
- Order: Lepidoptera
- Family: Nymphalidae
- Genus: Catuna
- Species: C. crithea

Binomial name
- Catuna crithea (Drury, 1773)

Synonyms
- Papilio crithea Drury, 1773; Catune crithea pallidior Rothschild, 1918; Catuna crithea var. reticulata Schultze, 1920; Catuna crithea var. conjux Aurivillius, 1922; Catuna crithea var. conjuncta Aurivillius, 1922; Catuna crithea ogrugae Hall, 1935; Catuna crithea canui Hecq, 1988

= Evena crithea =

Species of butterfly

Evena crithea, the common pathfinder, is a butterfly in the family Nymphalidae. It is found in Guinea, Sierra Leone, Liberia, Ivory Coast, Ghana, Togo, Nigeria, Cameroon, Bioko, Angola, the Democratic Republic of the Congo, Sudan, Uganda, Kenya, Tanzania and northern and western Zambia. The habitat consists of dense lowland forests and the riverine forest floor.

Adults are attracted to fallen fruit, especially of Cola and Ficus species.

The larvae feed on Bersama abyssinica, Mimusops kummel, Malacantha alnifolia, Aningueria robusta, Manilkara obovata, Bequaertiodendron, Englerophytum, Pachystela, Vincentella, Wildemaniodoxa, Gambeya, Pouteria, Chrysophyllum and Synsepalum species. Other sources list plants from the Ochnaceae and Apocynaceae families.

Torben Larsen developed a species numbering system for his 2005 publication Butterflies of West Africa. This species, then named Catuna crithea is #941. The 'Larsen' numbers have since been used with permission in A Sharp Eye on Butterflies of Ghana.

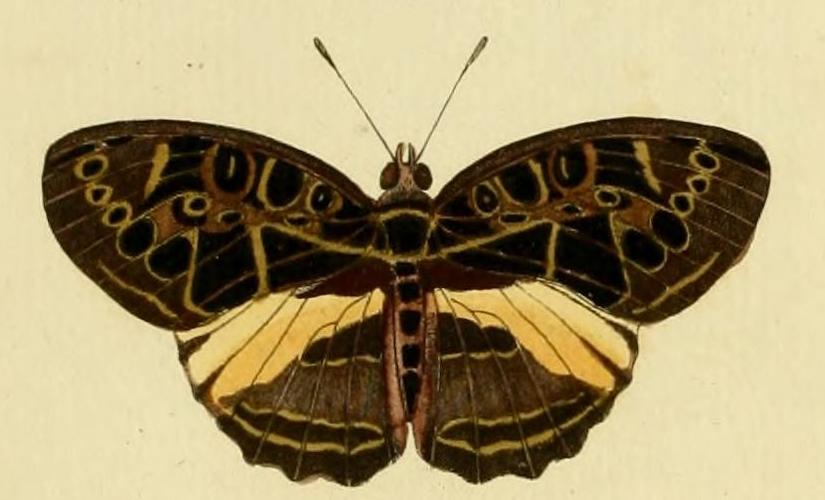

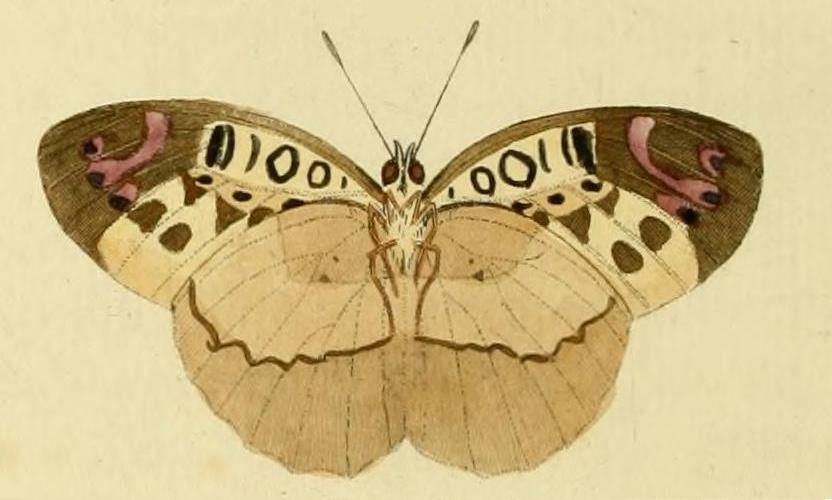

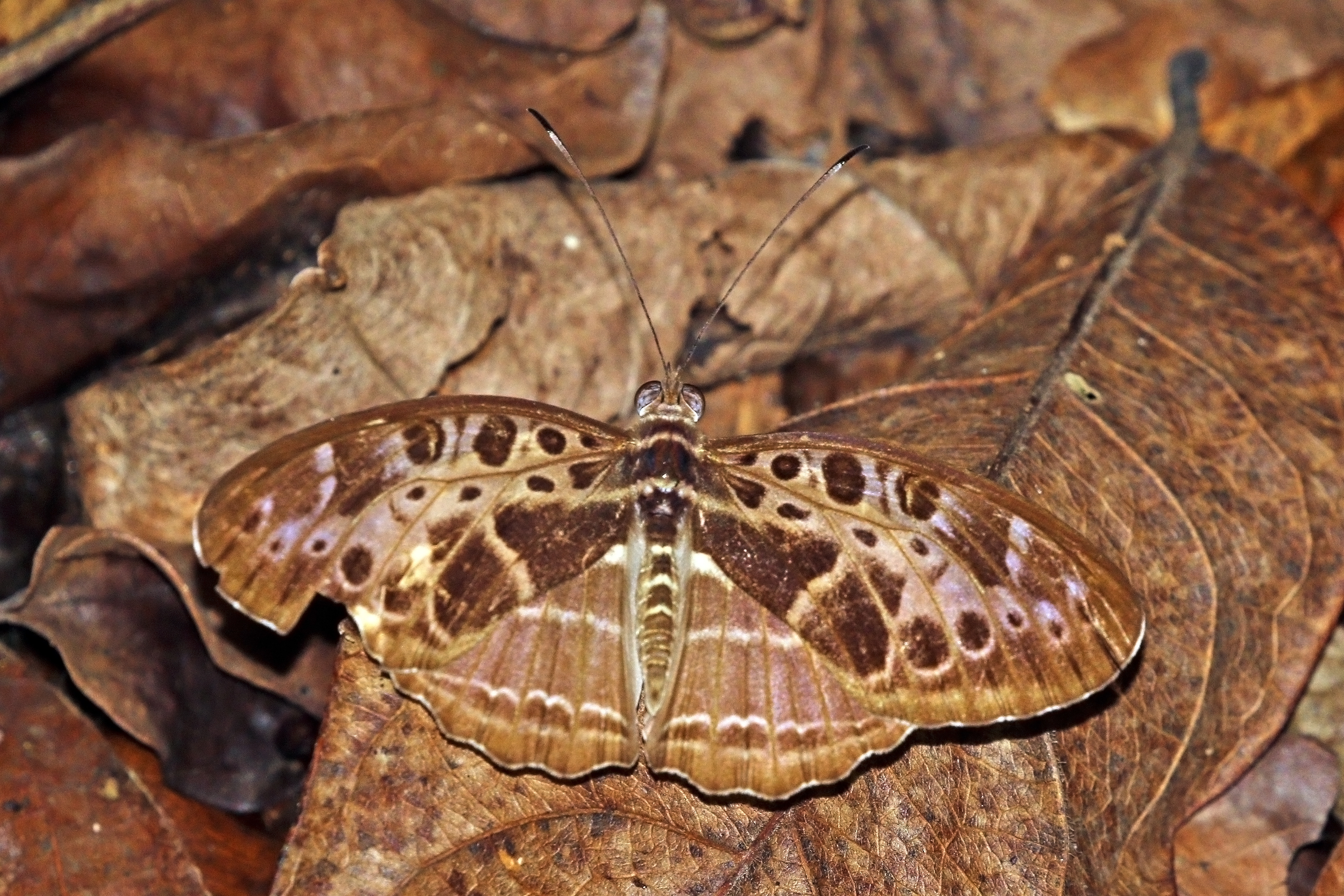
C. c. pallidior
Kakum National Park, Ghana
