= Manilkara rufula =

Conservation status
- Near Threatened (IUCN 2.3)

Scientific classification
- Kingdom: Plantae
- Clade: Tracheophytes
- Clade: Angiosperms
- Clade: Eudicots
- Clade: Asterids
- Order: Ericales
- Family: Sapotaceae
- Genus: Manilkara
- Species: M. rufula

Binomial name
- Manilkara rufula (Miq.) H.J.Lam

Synonyms
- Mimusops rufula Miq.

Species of tree

Manilkara rufula is a species of tree in the Sapodilla family. It is endemic to the northeastern submontane forests of Bahia, Sergipe, Pernambuco, Paraíba, Ceará and Piauí states of Brazil. Although this species exists in many places, where it occurs it is either not numerous, or its numbers are declining due to loss of habitat.

== Ecology ==
Manilkara rufula, along with its speciatic cousins M. longifolia and M. maxima, provide nectar as food for a primate called the golden-headed lion tamarin (Leontopithecus chrysomelas). Both tree and tamarin are only found in those remnants of Atlantic forest remaining in the northeastern region of Brazil. This habitat has long been disappearing through decades of intensive logging, followed by further disturbance in the converting of logged land to subsistence farming. What is left of said habitat comprises less than four percent of its original area.

These small habitats, islands of forest called "brejos", are fragments of moist forest caatingas, surrounded on every side by either dry forest caatingas, or by cerrados, swaths of shrubby vegetation resembling savanna, where M. rufula cannot grow. Unlike its dryer neighbors, caatinga moist forests occur primarily along inaccessible ridges and on solitary prominences, and are deluged by tropical rains measuring from 1,000 to 1,300 mm annually.

Manilkara rufula, along with some of its tree species associates (Podocarpus sellowii, Prunus sphaerocarpa, for example) is a remnant of an earlier climatological regime, when the northeast region as a whole was far moister than most of it is today. A prisoner both geographically and genetically, M. rufula is prevented from further spread by the less-than-ideal arid growing conditions all around it.
