= Evena angustatum =

- Kakum National Park, Ghana

Scientific classification
- Kingdom: Animalia
- Phylum: Arthropoda
- Clade: Pancrustacea
- Class: Insecta
- Order: Lepidoptera
- Family: Nymphalidae
- Genus: Catuna
- Species: C. angustatum

Binomial name
- Catuna angustatum (Felder & Felder, 1867)

Synonyms
- Euomma angustatum Felder & Felder, 1867; Catuna angustatum albidior Rothschild, 1918

Species of butterfly

Evena angustatum, the large pathfinder, is a butterfly in the family Nymphalidae. It is found in Sierra Leone, Liberia, Ivory Coast, Ghana, Togo, Nigeria, Cameroon, Gabon, the Republic of the Congo, the Central African Republic, the Democratic Republic of the Congo, Uganda (western areas to Semuliki National Park), Rwanda and Tanzania. The habitat consists of forests.

The larvae feed on Manilkara obovata, Mimusops kummel, Malacantha alnifolia and Aningueria robusta.

Torben Larsen developed a species numbering system for his 2005 publication Butterflies of West Africa. This species, then named Catuna angustatum is #944. The 'Larsen' numbers have since been used with permission in A Sharp Eye on Butterflies of Ghana.
