= Evena niji =

Scientific classification
- Kingdom: Animalia
- Phylum: Arthropoda
- Clade: Pancrustacea
- Class: Insecta
- Order: Lepidoptera
- Family: Nymphalidae
- Genus: Catuna
- Species: C. niji

Binomial name
- Catuna niji Fox, 1965

Synonyms
- Catuna rectecostata Büttikofer, 1890

Species of butterfly

Evena niji, or Fox's pathfinder, is a butterfly in the family Nymphalidae. It is found in Sierra Leone, Liberia, Ivory Coast, western Ghana, western Cameroon, Gabon and the Democratic Republic of the Congo (the Mayoumbe region). The habitat consists of forests.

The larvae feed on Manilkara, Englerophytum, Vincentella and Afrosersalisia species.
