= Planostocha cumulata =

Scientific classification
- Kingdom: Animalia
- Phylum: Arthropoda
- Class: Insecta
- Order: Lepidoptera
- Family: Tortricidae
- Genus: Planostocha
- Species: P. cumulata

Binomial name
- Planostocha cumulata (Meyrick, 1907)

Synonyms
- Cacoecia cumulata Meyrick, 1907

Species of moth

Planostocha cumulata is a species of moth of the family Tortricidae first described by Edward Meyrick in 1907. It has a wide distribution, ranging from India, Sri Lanka, Nepal, Myanmar, Korea, Thailand, Brunei and New Guinea to Queensland in Australia. The habitat consists of lowland to montane areas.

The wingspan of the adult male is 9 mm. Larval host plants are Lantana camara and Manilkara zapota.
