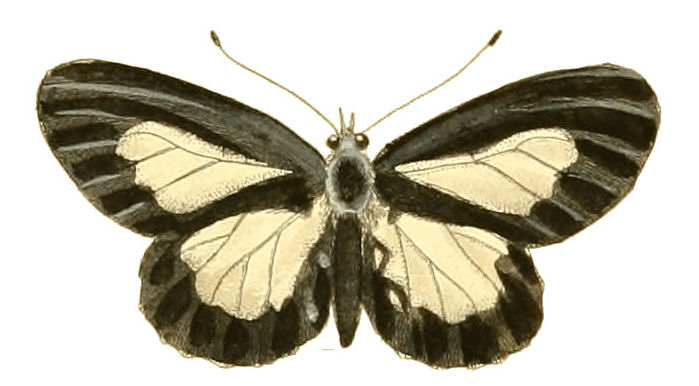
- Illustration by Dru Drury

Scientific classification
- Kingdom: Animalia
- Phylum: Arthropoda
- Clade: Pancrustacea
- Class: Insecta
- Order: Lepidoptera
- Family: Nymphalidae
- Genus: Mesoxantha; Aurivillius, 1898
- Species: M. ethosea

Binomial name
- Mesoxantha ethosea (Drury, 1782)

Synonyms
- Papilio ethosea Drury, 1782; Mesoxantha ethoseoides Rebel, 1914; Mesoxantha ethosea albeola Rothschild, 1918; Mesoxantha katera Stoneham, 1935

= Mesoxantha =

Monotypic brush-footed butterfly genus

Mesoxantha is a genus of nymphalid butterflies. It is monotypic, containing only Mesoxantha ethosea, the Drury's delight. It is found in Sierra Leone, Guinea, Liberia, Ivory Coast, Ghana, Togo, Nigeria, Cameroon, Gabon, the Republic of the Congo, the Central African Republic, Angola, the Democratic Republic of the Congo, Sudan, Uganda, Tanzania and Mozambique. The habitat consists of lowland forests, including secondary forests.

The larvae feed on Tragia brevipes and Malacantha alnifolia.

== Description ==
Upperside: Antennae black. Thorax, abdomen, and wings deep brown, almost black; the disk of the anterior being white, and extending to the shoulders, all the middle part of the posterior being white likewise.

Underside: Palpi grey. Breast and abdomen brown. Anterior wings next the body yellowish brown, but towards the tips inclining to grey; nerves black; the disk white, with a round black spot near the body, and another of a smaller size below it. The middle of the posterior wings is white, surrounded with brown, that part along the lower edges being darkest; next the body are five distinct black round spots, and an irregular shaped one at the middle of the upper edge; along the lower edges are a number of small triangular white spots. Margins of the posterior wings slightly dentated. Wingspan 2 1/4 inches (57 mm).

== Subspecies ==
- Mesoxantha ethosea ethosea (Sierra Leone, Guinea, Liberia, Ivory Coast, Ghana, Togo)
- Mesoxantha ethosea ethoseoides Rebel, 1914 (Nigeria: south and the Cross River loop, Cameroon, Gabon, Congo, Central African Republic, Angola, eastern and southern Democratic Republic of the Congo)
- Mesoxantha ethosea reducta Rothschild, 1918 (southern Sudan, Uganda, western Tanzania, possibly Mozambique)

Torben Larsen developed a species numbering system for his 2005 publication Butterflies of West Africa. The nominate subspecies is #828. The 'Larsen' numbers have since been used with permission in A Sharp Eye on Butterflies of Ghana.
