= Ceylon Ironwood =

Ceylon ironwood is a common name for several plants and may refer to:

- Manilkara hexandra
- Mesua ferrea
