= Milk tree =

Milk tree is a common name for several plants and may refer to:

- Manilkara hexandra
- Sapium
