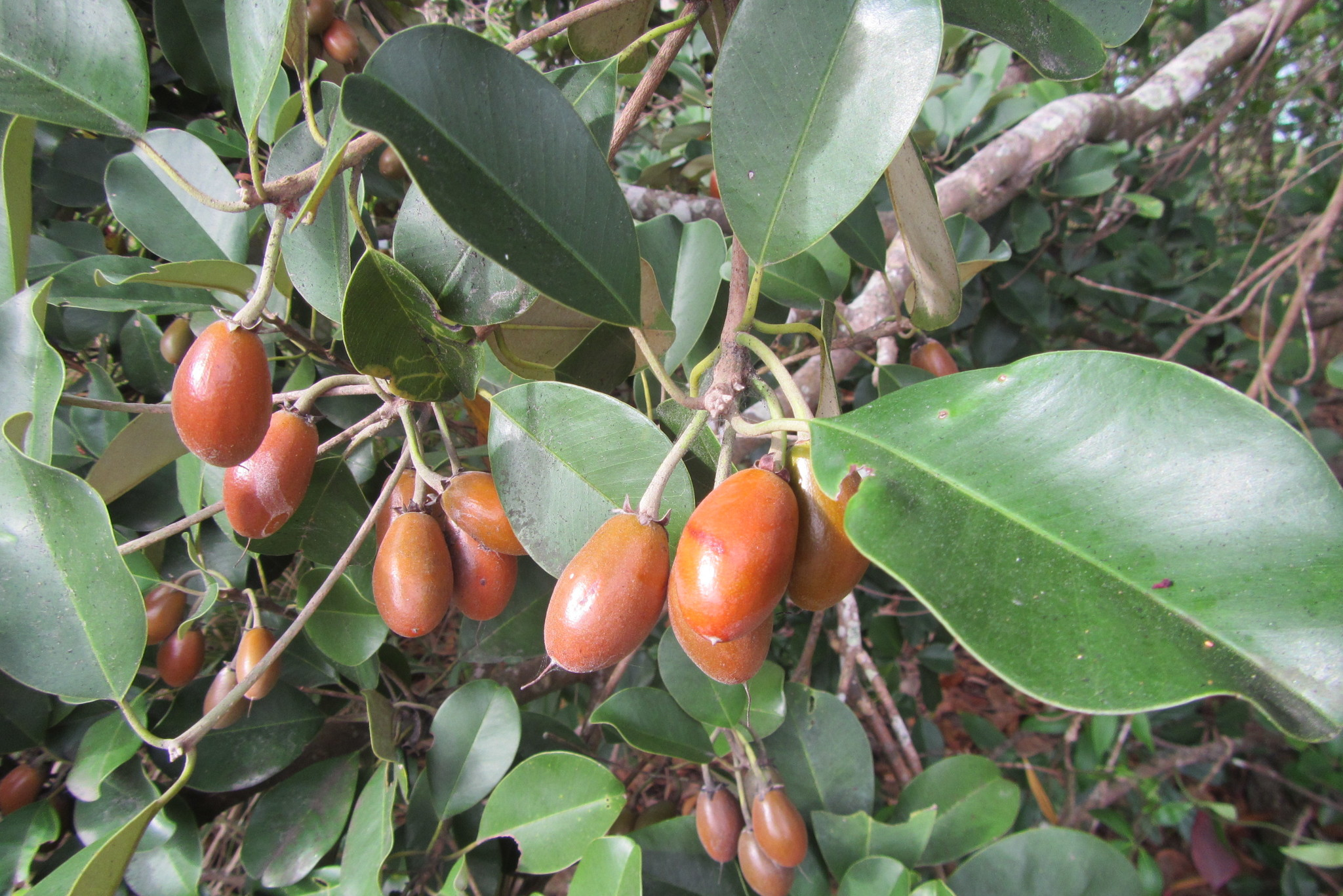
- Fruits and foliage
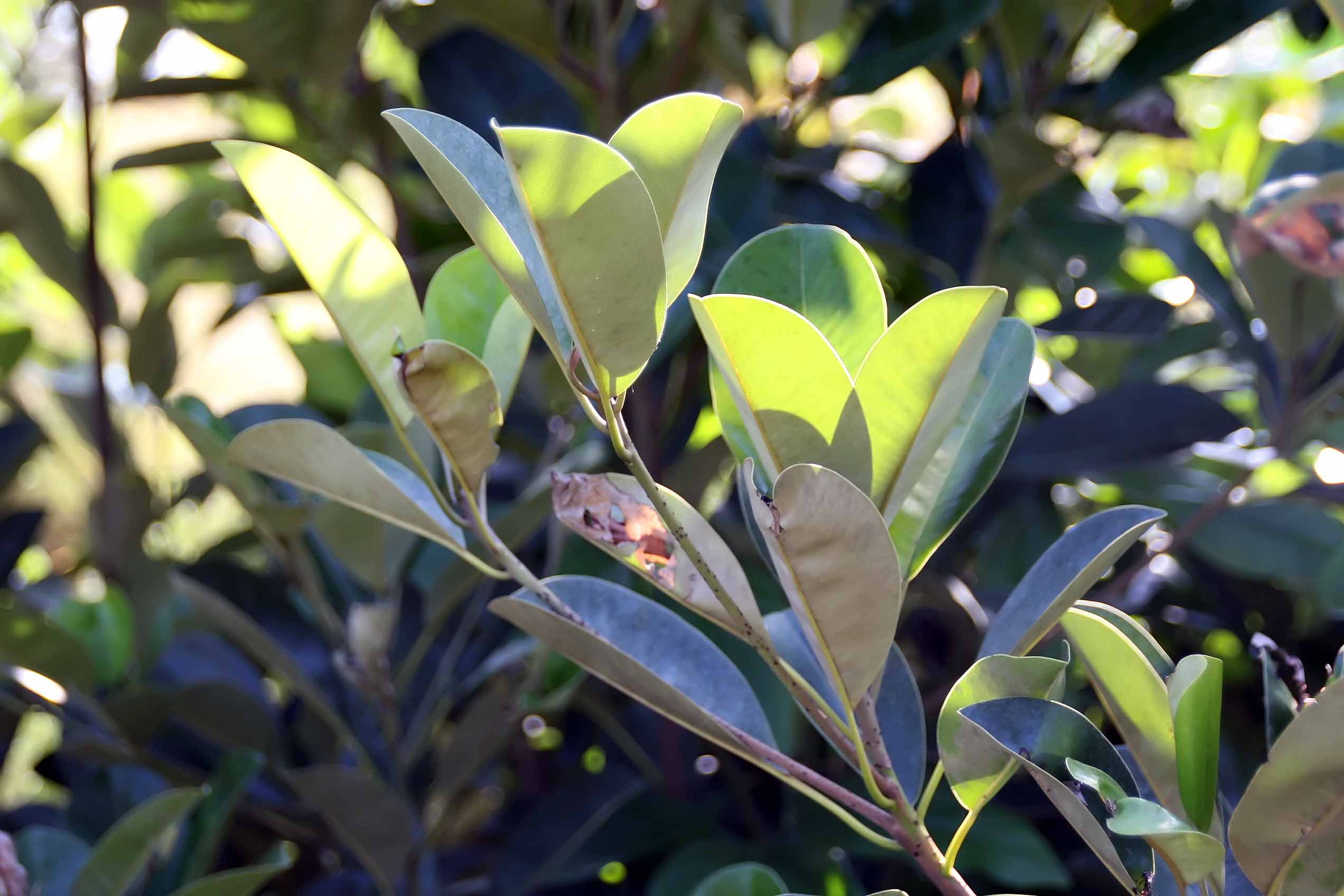
- Leaves

Scientific classification
- Kingdom: Plantae
- Clade: Embryophytes
- Clade: Tracheophytes
- Clade: Angiosperms
- Clade: Eudicots
- Clade: Asterids
- Order: Ericales
- Family: Sapotaceae
- Genus: Manilkara
- Species: M. kauki

Binomial name
- Manilkara kauki (L.) Dubard

Synonyms
- Kaukenia kauki (L.) Kuntze; Mimusops browniana (A.DC.) Benth; Mimusops kauki L. (basionym); Mimusops manilkara G.Don; Manilkara kaukii (lapsus)

= Manilkara kauki =

Species of tree

Manilkara kauki is a plant in the subfamily Sapotoideae, and the tribe Sapoteae of the family Sapotaceae; and is the type species for the genus Manilkara. It occurs in tropical Asia from Indo-China (Cambodia, Myanmar, Thailand and Vietnam) to Malesia (Indonesia, Malaysia and Papua New Guinea); and also in northern Queensland in Australia.

It is rarely planted commercially but as an ornamental plant.

== Names ==
Throughout the world it is known generally by the name caqui, but in Australia it is called wongi. In Java, the plant is called sawo kacik. The fruit is called adão (Adam’s fruit) in Konkani.

== Description ==
Its leaves are rigid and have blunt tips, its upper surfaces are dark green while pale and silky underneath.

Its fruiting season is from December to February, it produces edible ovoid fruit that turns dark orangish red when ripe, each are 2.5–5.32 cm long and 2 cm wide with a smooth pale brown seed inside.

== Uses ==
The fruit is traditionally eaten by Torres Strait Islanders, who travel from island to island to harvest the crop. Members and servants of Javanese royal families plant them in palace gardens as a symbol of kindness and loyalty.

It often grows wild in forests attracting birds and primates. For reforestation purposes, M. kauki is a useful graft stock for M. zapota, and parts of the plant are used in herbal medicine.
