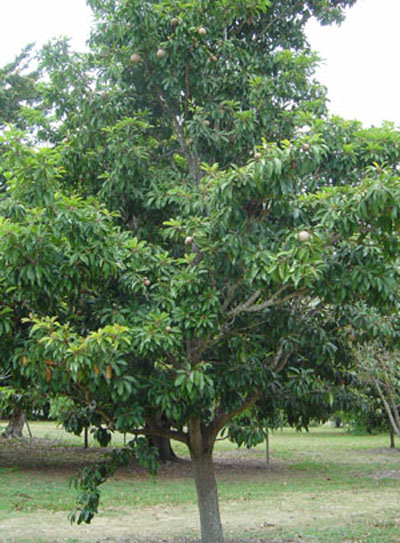

Scientific classification
- Kingdom: Plantae
- Clade: Tracheophytes
- Clade: Angiosperms
- Clade: Eudicots
- Clade: Asterids
- Order: Ericales
- Family: Sapotaceae
- Genus: Manilkara
- Species: M. chicle

Binomial name
- Manilkara chicle (Pittier) Gilly

Synonyms
- Achras chicle Pittier; Mopania chicle (Pittier) Lundell list sources

= Manilkara chicle =

Species of tree

Manilkara chicle is a tropical evergreen tree native to Mexico and Central America. The tree ranges from Veracruz in Mexico south to Atlántico in Colombia. It yields a natural gum known as chicle, traditionally used in making chewing gum and other products.

== See also ==
- Manilkara zapota, the sapodilla tree
