= Manilkara gonavensis =

Conservation status
- Critically endangered, possibly extinct (IUCN 3.1)

Scientific classification
- Kingdom: Plantae
- Clade: Tracheophytes
- Clade: Angiosperms
- Clade: Eudicots
- Clade: Asterids
- Order: Ericales
- Family: Sapotaceae
- Genus: Manilkara
- Species: M. gonavensis

Binomial name
- Manilkara gonavensis (Urb. & Ekman) Gilly ex Cronquist

Synonyms
- Mimusops gonavensis Urb. & Ekman

Species of tree

Manilkara gonavensis is a tree species in the sapodilla family endemic to Haiti's Gonâve Island that is considered to be possibly extinct.

== Taxonomy ==
The specimen was taken from Haiti's Gonâve Island, which is reflected in the choice of its specific epithet.

== Description ==
It has only ever been collected one time for study, when the type specimen was taken. This was in the early 20th century, before 1929, which is the year it was described (the year of a plant's collection often predates its description by years, sometimes even decades). Consequently, very little is known about M. gonavensis, and further study is needed.
