= Manilkara excisa =

Conservation status
- Endangered (IUCN 2.3)

Scientific classification
- Kingdom: Plantae
- Clade: Tracheophytes
- Clade: Angiosperms
- Clade: Eudicots
- Clade: Asterids
- Order: Ericales
- Family: Sapotaceae
- Genus: Manilkara
- Species: M. excisa

Binomial name
- Manilkara excisa (Urb.) H.J.Lam

Synonyms
- Mimusops excisa Urb.

Species of tree

Manilkara excisa (known locally as either sapodilla bullet, sapodilla or simply sappa) is an endangered species of tall tree in the sapodilla family. It is endemic to the extremely steep, forested limestone hills of Trelawny, Cockpit Country and St. James parishes in Jamaica, where, although it is highly prized for its wood, it is threatened by habitat loss.
