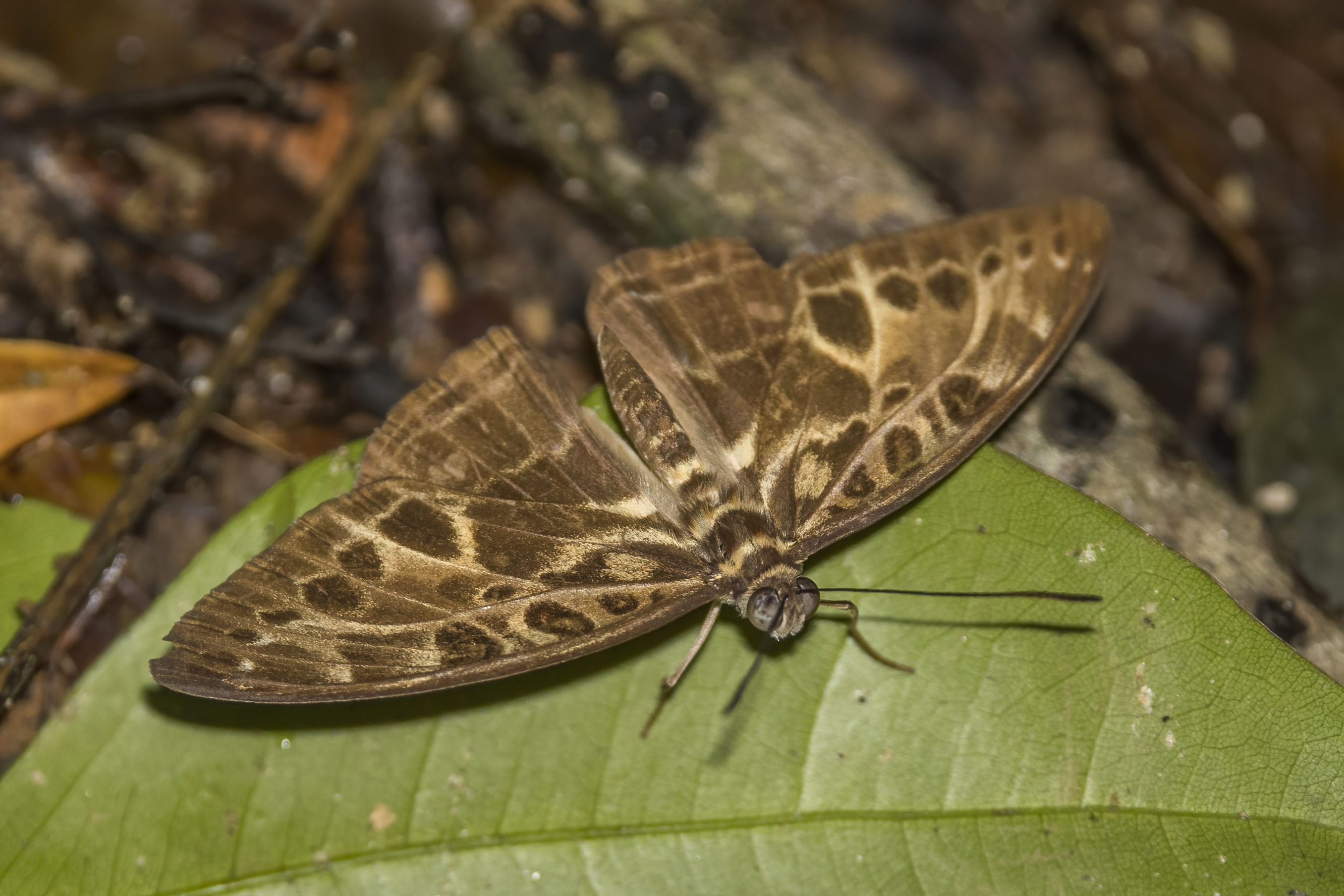
- in Ghana

Scientific classification
- Kingdom: Animalia
- Phylum: Arthropoda
- Clade: Pancrustacea
- Class: Insecta
- Order: Lepidoptera
- Family: Nymphalidae
- Genus: Catuna
- Species: C. oberthueri

Binomial name
- Catuna oberthueri Karsch, 1894

= Evena oberthueri =

Species of butterfly

Evena oberthueri, or Oberthür's pathfinder, is a butterfly in the family Nymphalidae, named after the French entomologist Charles Oberthür. It is found in Sierra Leone, Liberia, Ivory Coast, Ghana, Nigeria, Cameroon, the Republic of the Congo, the Central African Republic, the Democratic Republic of the Congo and western Tanzania. The habitat consists of forests.

Torben Larsen developed a species numbering system for his 2005 publication Butterflies of West Africa. This species, then named Catuna oberthueri is #943. The 'Larsen' numbers have since been used with permission in A Sharp Eye on Butterflies of Ghana.
