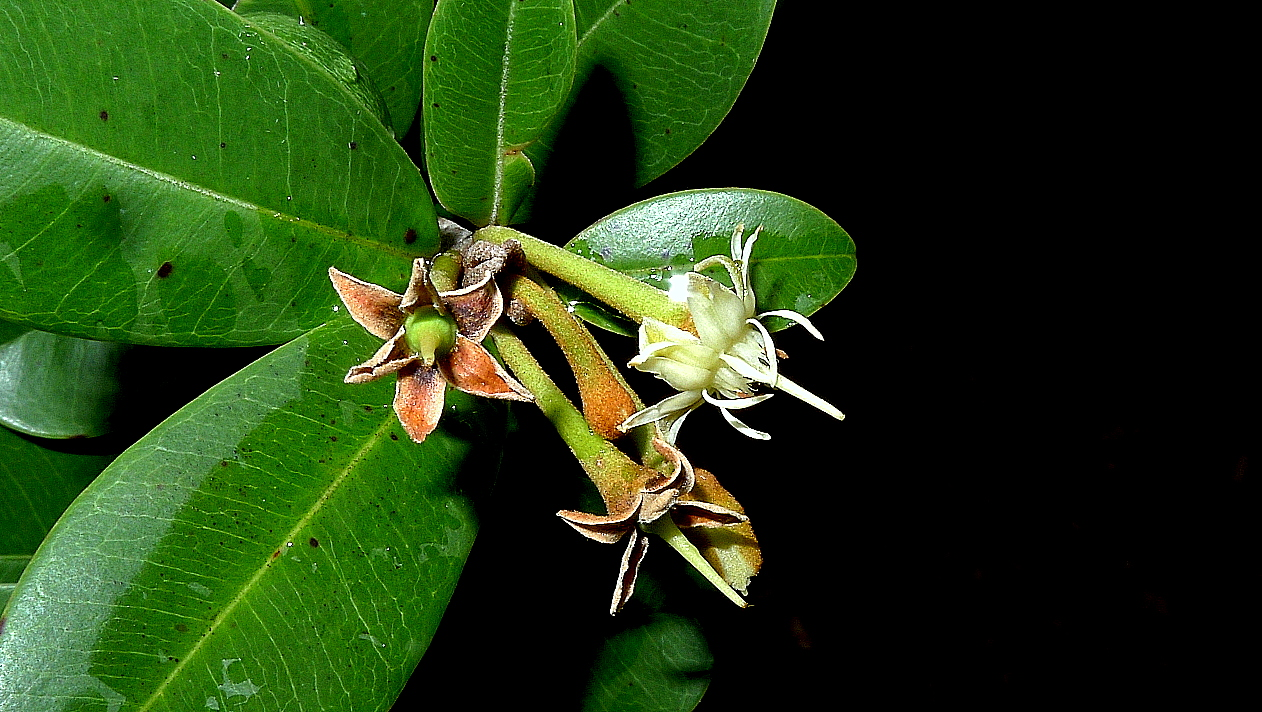

Conservation status
- Critically Endangered (IUCN 3.1)

Scientific classification
- Kingdom: Plantae
- Clade: Tracheophytes
- Clade: Angiosperms
- Clade: Eudicots
- Clade: Asterids
- Order: Ericales
- Family: Sapotaceae
- Genus: Manilkara
- Species: M. dardanoi

Binomial name
- Manilkara dardanoi Ducke

= Manilkara dardanoi =

Species of tree

Manilkara dardanoi is a tree species in the sapodilla family. It is endemic to Brazil, and only found in a small portion of Pernambuco. Here it grows in forests mostly along the coast, or elsewhere deeper inland where there is old secondary forest. Its natural habitat is gradually disappearing as forest is felled and land is cleared for human settlement.
