= Manilkara nicholsonii =

Conservation status
- Endangered (IUCN 2.3)

Scientific classification
- Kingdom: Plantae
- Clade: Tracheophytes
- Clade: Angiosperms
- Clade: Eudicots
- Clade: Asterids
- Order: Ericales
- Family: Sapotaceae
- Genus: Manilkara
- Species: M. nicholsonii

Binomial name
- Manilkara nicholsonii A.E.van Wyk

Species of fruit and plant

Manilkara nicholsonii is a species of flowering plant in the family Sapotaceae. It is a tree endemic to KwaZulu-Natal Province of South Africa, and is threatened by habitat loss.
