= Planostocha undulans =

Scientific classification
- Domain: Eukaryota
- Kingdom: Animalia
- Phylum: Arthropoda
- Class: Insecta
- Order: Lepidoptera
- Family: Tortricidae
- Genus: Planostocha
- Species: P. undulans

Binomial name
- Planostocha undulans (Diakonoff, 1944)

Synonyms
- Diadelomorpha undulans Diakonoff, 1944

Species of moth

Planostocha undulans is a species of moth of the family Tortricidae. It is found on New Guinea.
