= Planostocha =

Scientific classification
- Kingdom: Animalia
- Phylum: Arthropoda
- Class: Insecta
- Order: Lepidoptera
- Family: Tortricidae
- Tribe: Archipini
- Genus: Planostocha; Meyrick, 1912

Synonyms
- Diadelomorpha Diakonoff, 1944

Genus of tortrix moths

Planostocha is a genus of moths belonging to the subfamily Tortricinae of the family Tortricidae.

== Species ==
- Planostocha clavigera (Diakonoff, 1953)
- Planostocha cumulata (Meyrick, 1907)
- Planostocha curvosa (Diakonoff, 1941)
- Planostocha undulans (Diakonoff, 1944)

== See also ==
- List of Tortricidae genera
