= Manilkara paraensis =

Conservation status
- Conservation Dependent (IUCN 2.3)

Scientific classification
- Kingdom: Plantae
- Clade: Embryophytes
- Clade: Tracheophytes
- Clade: Spermatophytes
- Clade: Angiosperms
- Clade: Eudicots
- Clade: Asterids
- Order: Ericales
- Family: Sapotaceae
- Genus: Manilkara
- Species: M. paraensis

Binomial name
- Manilkara paraensis (Huber) Standl.

Synonyms
- Mimusops paraensis Huber; Mimusops paraensis var. densiflora Huber; Mimusops paraensis var. discolor Huber

Species of flowering plant

Manilkara paraensis is a species of plant in the family Sapotaceae. It is endemic to Brazil, where it is threatened by habitat loss.
