= Planostocha clavigera =

Scientific classification
- Domain: Eukaryota
- Kingdom: Animalia
- Phylum: Arthropoda
- Class: Insecta
- Order: Lepidoptera
- Family: Tortricidae
- Genus: Planostocha
- Species: P. clavigera

Binomial name
- Planostocha clavigera (Diakonoff, 1953)

Synonyms
- Diadelomorpha clavigera Diakonoff, 1953

Species of moth

Planostocha clavigera is a species of moth of the family Tortricidae. It is found on New Guinea.
