= Manilkara kanosiensis =

Conservation status
- Endangered (IUCN 3.1)

Scientific classification
- Kingdom: Plantae
- Clade: Tracheophytes
- Clade: Angiosperms
- Clade: Eudicots
- Clade: Asterids
- Order: Ericales
- Family: Sapotaceae
- Genus: Manilkara
- Species: M. kanosiensis

Binomial name
- Manilkara kanosiensis H.J.Lam & B.Meeuse

Synonyms
- Manilkara napali P.Royen

Species of tree

Manilkara kanosiensis (commonly known as torem or sawai) is a species of tree in the sapodilla family Sapotaceae. It is thinly dispersed in low-lying rainforests over a large range, from the Maluku Islands of Indonesia to New Guinea and the Bismarck Archipelago (New Britain and New Ireland) of Papua New Guinea. It is endangered by the furious pace of logging in its native habitat, where it is felled as timber.
