= Manilkara pleeana =

Conservation status
- Vulnerable (IUCN 2.3)

Scientific classification
- Kingdom: Plantae
- Clade: Tracheophytes
- Clade: Angiosperms
- Clade: Eudicots
- Clade: Asterids
- Order: Ericales
- Family: Sapotaceae
- Genus: Manilkara
- Species: M. pleeana

Binomial name
- Manilkara pleeana (Pierre ex Baill.) Cronquist

Synonyms
- Mimusops pleeana Pierre ex Baill.

Species of plant

Manilkara pleeana, the zapote de costa, is a species of plant in the family Sapotaceae. It is native to Puerto Rico and the Virgin Islands.
