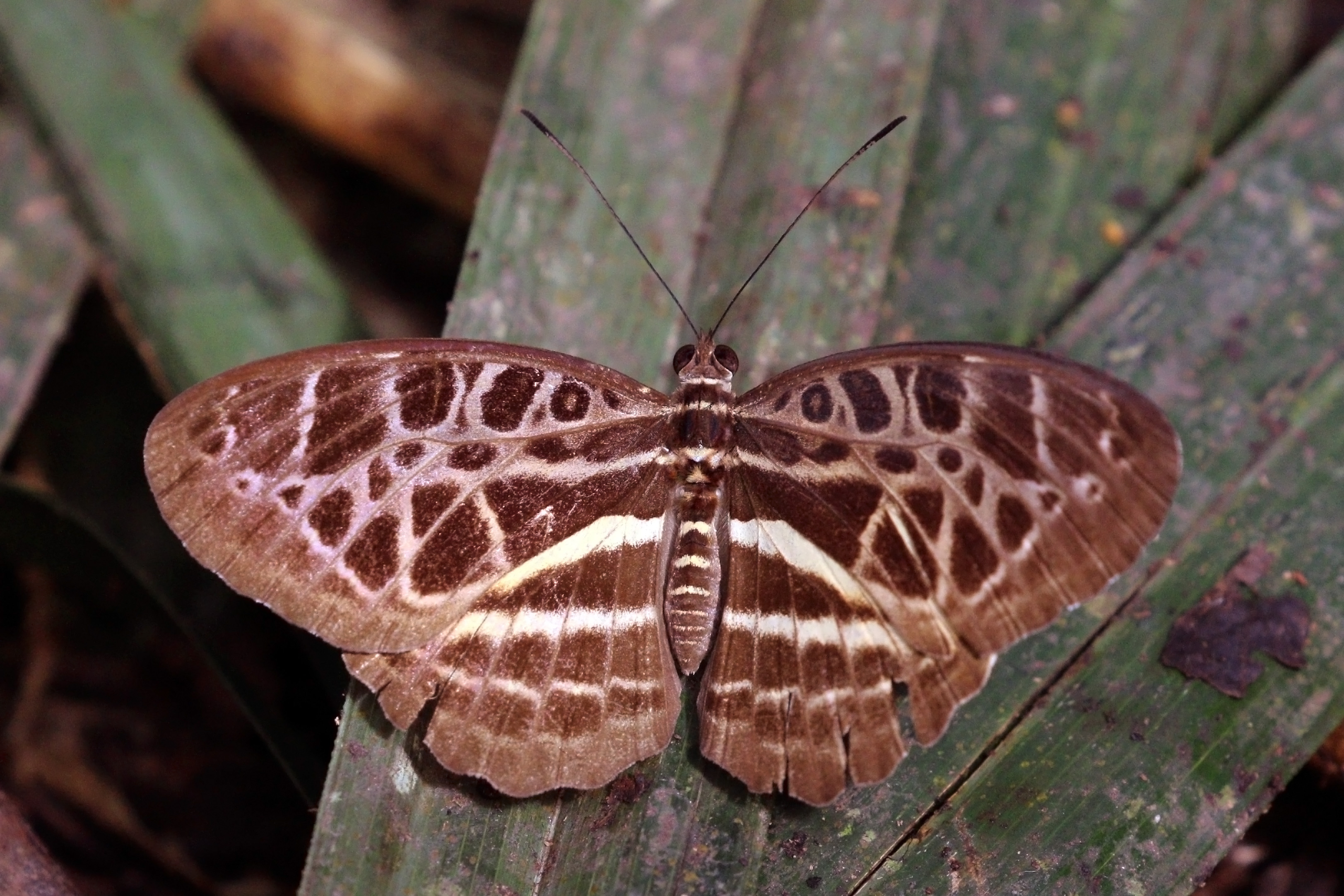
- E. crithea conjuncta Uganda

Scientific classification
- Kingdom: Animalia
- Phylum: Arthropoda
- Clade: Pancrustacea
- Class: Insecta
- Order: Lepidoptera
- Family: Nymphalidae
- Tribe: Adoliadini
- Genus: Catuna; Kirby, 1871

Species
- Five, see text

Synonyms
- Evena Westwood, [1850]; Euomma C. & R. Felder, [1867]; Jaera Hübner, [1819]

= Evena =

Genus of brush-footed butterflies

Catuna is an Afrotropical genus of brush-footed butterflies.

== Species ==
- Evena angustatum (C. & R. Felder, [1867])
- Evena crithea (Drury, [1773])
- Evena niji Fox, 1965
- Evena oberthueri Karsch, 1894
- Evena sikorana Rogenhofer, 1889
