= Manilkara mayarensis =

Conservation status
- Endangered (IUCN 2.3)

Scientific classification
- Kingdom: Plantae
- Clade: Tracheophytes
- Clade: Angiosperms
- Clade: Eudicots
- Clade: Asterids
- Order: Ericales
- Family: Sapotaceae
- Genus: Manilkara
- Species: M. mayarensis

Binomial name
- Manilkara mayarensis (Ekman ex Urb.) Cronquist

Synonyms
- Mimusops mayarensis Ekman ex Urb.

Species of flowering plant

Manilkara mayarensis is a plant species in the family of sapodillas, which grows wild only in Cuba's Oriente Province. Here its members range in scale from shrubs to small trees. Its usual haunts are along creeks, ravines and other naturally formed watercourses within its montane, serpentine shrubwood habitat.

== Threats ==
Mineral interests have often been favored over conservation considerations, and the result has meant a kind of self-perpetuating cycle of diminishing returns for both. That is to say, permanent loss of habitat is related directly to the further scarcity of the mineral resources in the mountains where M. mayerensis live, which is caused, yet also spurred on by, an ever greater drive to obtain said minerals.
