= Manilkara subsericea =

Conservation status
- Conservation Dependent (IUCN 2.3)

Scientific classification
- Kingdom: Plantae
- Clade: Tracheophytes
- Clade: Angiosperms
- Clade: Eudicots
- Clade: Asterids
- Order: Ericales
- Family: Sapotaceae
- Genus: Manilkara
- Species: M. subsericea

Binomial name
- Manilkara subsericea (Mart.) Dubard

Synonyms
- Kaukenia subsericea (Mart.) Kuntze; Mimusops subsericea Mart.; Synarrhena subsericea (Mart.) Fisch. & C.A.Mey.; Kaukenia floribunda (Mart.) Kuntze; Manilkara bella Monach.; Manilkara floribunda (Mart.) Dubard; Mimusops floribunda Mart.; Mimusops subsericea var. acmanthera Miq.; Mimusops subsericea var. acuminata Pierre; Mimusops subsericea var. massaranduba Pierre; Synarrhena floribunda (Mart.) Fisch. & C.A.Mey.

Species of flowering plant

Manilkara subsericea is a species of plant in the family Sapotaceae. It is endemic to Brazil, and threatened by habitat loss.
