= Planostocha curvosa =

Scientific classification
- Domain: Eukaryota
- Kingdom: Animalia
- Phylum: Arthropoda
- Class: Insecta
- Order: Lepidoptera
- Family: Tortricidae
- Genus: Planostocha
- Species: P. curvosa

Binomial name
- Planostocha curvosa (Diakonoff, 1941)

Synonyms
- Syndemis curvosa Diakonoff, 1941

Species of moth

Planostocha curvosa is a species of moth of the family Tortricidae. It is found in Indonesia, where it has been recorded from the Maluku Islands.
