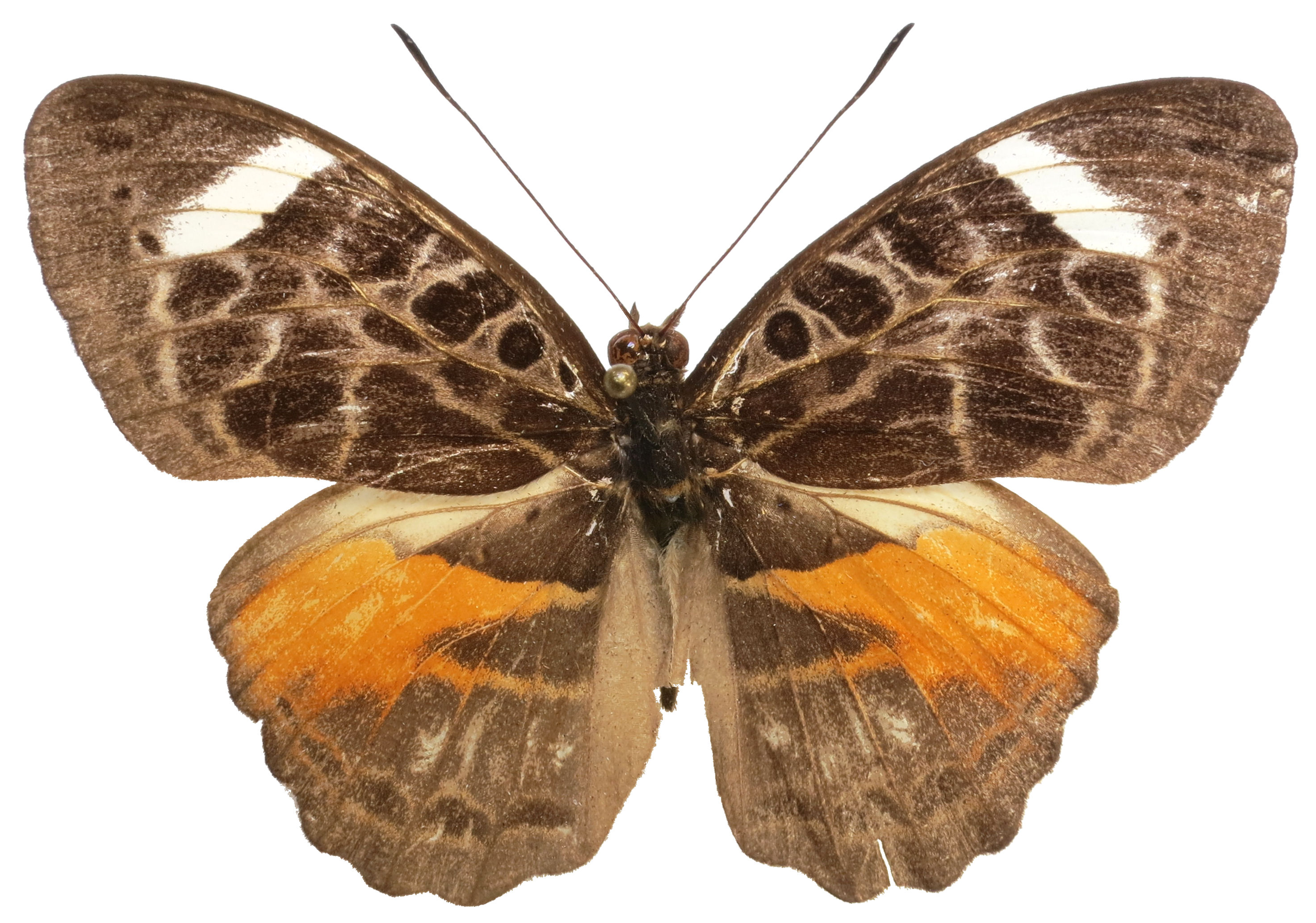
- male - Uluguru Mountains, Tanzania

Scientific classification
- Kingdom: Animalia
- Phylum: Arthropoda
- Clade: Pancrustacea
- Class: Insecta
- Order: Lepidoptera
- Family: Nymphalidae
- Genus: Catuna
- Species: C. sikorana

Binomial name
- Catuna sikorana Rogenhofer, 1889

= Evena sikorana =

Species of butterfly

Catuna sikorana is a butterfly in the family Nymphalidae. It is found in eastern Tanzania and northern Malawi. The habitat consists of lowland forests.

The larvae possibly feed on Melianthaceae species.
