= Manilkara maxima =

Conservation status
- Vulnerable (IUCN 2.3)

Scientific classification
- Kingdom: Plantae
- Clade: Tracheophytes
- Clade: Angiosperms
- Clade: Eudicots
- Clade: Asterids
- Order: Ericales
- Family: Sapotaceae
- Genus: Manilkara
- Species: M. maxima

Binomial name
- Manilkara maxima T.D.Penn.

Species of flowering plant

Manilkara maxima is a species of plant in the family Sapotaceae. It is endemic to Brazil, where it is threatened by habitat loss.
