= Manilkara spectabilis =

Conservation status
- Critically Endangered (IUCN 2.3)

Scientific classification
- Kingdom: Plantae
- Clade: Tracheophytes
- Clade: Angiosperms
- Clade: Eudicots
- Clade: Asterids
- Order: Ericales
- Family: Sapotaceae
- Genus: Manilkara
- Species: M. spectabilis

Binomial name
- Manilkara spectabilis (Pittier) Standl.

Synonyms
- Mimusops spectabilis Pittier

Species of tree

Manilkara spectabilis is an uncommon species of tree in the sapodilla family.

In 1997, the IUCN were mistakenly under the impression that a specimen in the US, collected in 1899 from a site near Limón in the Atlantic coastal forests of Costa Rica was the only specimen that had ever been collected for of the species, and therefore assumed it might be an endemic to this location. Based on this supposition, the species was provisionally declared 'critically endangered'. It had in fact been collected in Nicaragua in 1951 already, and after being declared 'critically endangered' it was soon found elsewhere in eastern coastal Costa Rica by local researchers.
