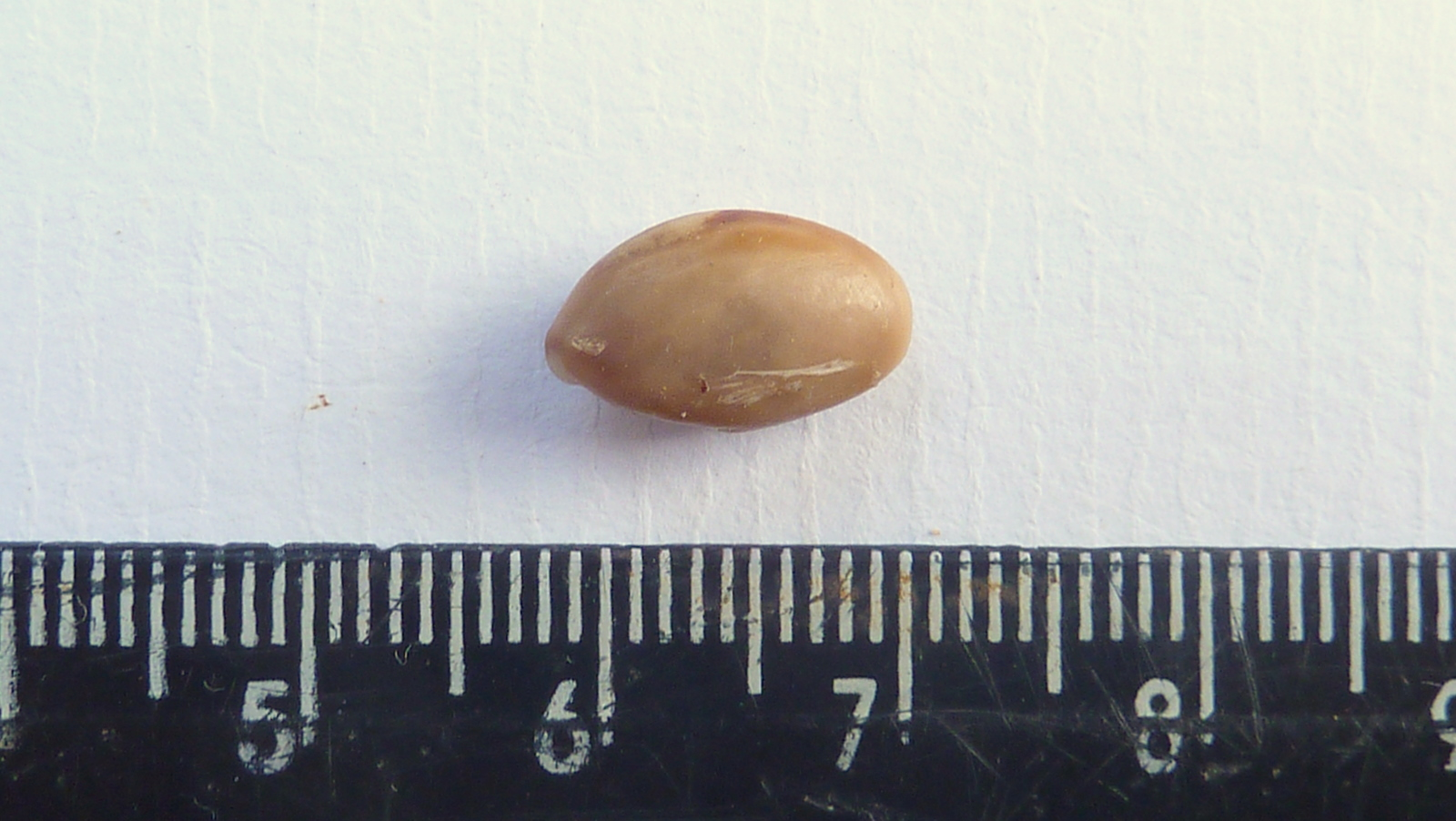

Conservation status
- Endangered (IUCN 2.3)

Scientific classification
- Kingdom: Plantae
- Clade: Tracheophytes
- Clade: Angiosperms
- Clade: Eudicots
- Clade: Asterids
- Order: Ericales
- Family: Sapotaceae
- Genus: Manilkara
- Species: M. longifolia

Binomial name
- Manilkara longifolia (A.DC.) Dubard

Synonyms
- Mimusops longifolia A.DC.

= Manilkara longifolia =

Masseranduba

Species of flowering plant

Manilkara longifolia, commonly known as masseranduba, is a species of plant in the family Sapotaceae. It is endemic to Brazil, where it is threatened by habitat loss.
