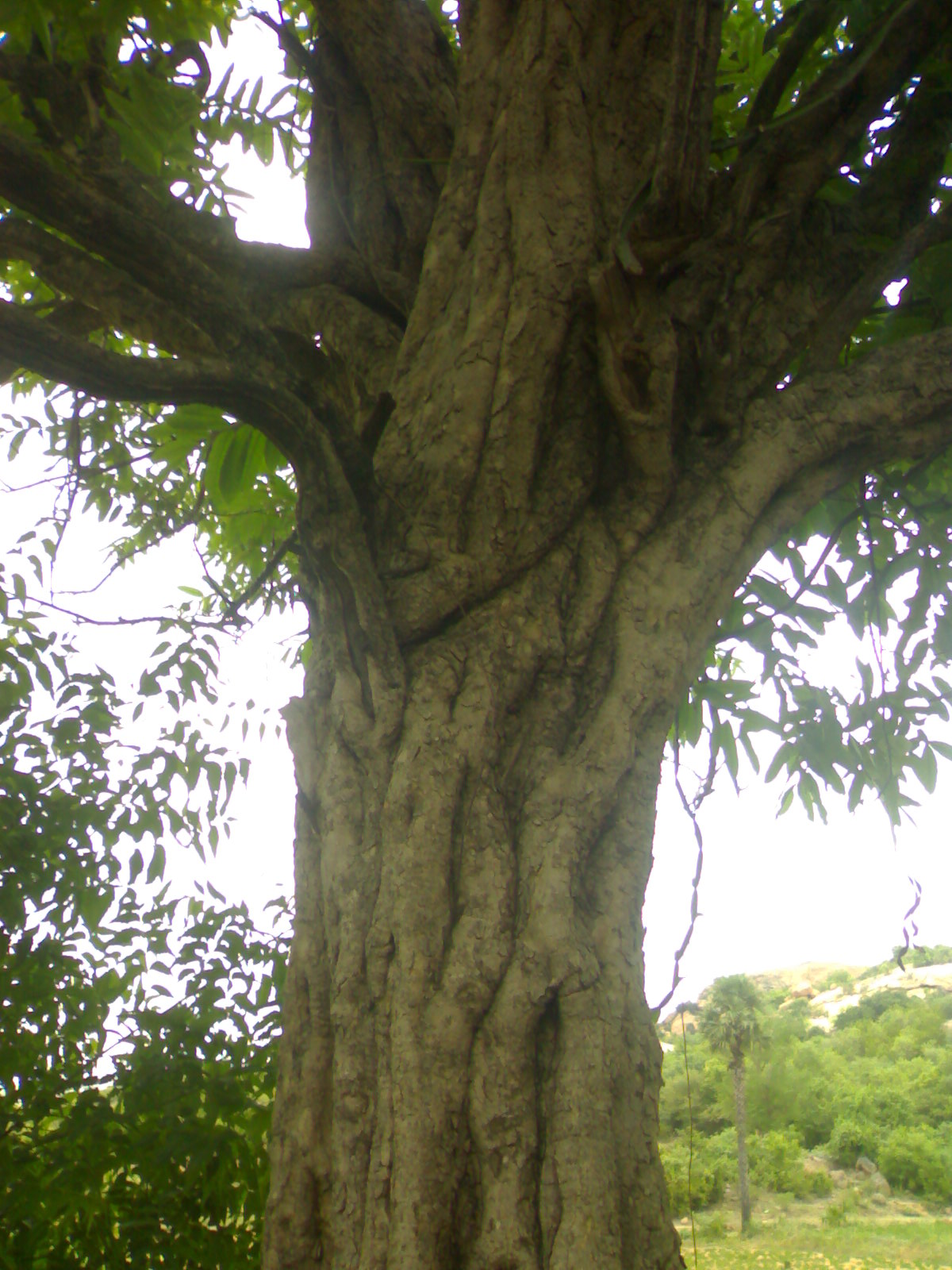

Scientific classification
- Kingdom: Plantae
- Clade: Tracheophytes
- Clade: Angiosperms
- Clade: Eudicots
- Clade: Asterids
- Order: Ericales
- Family: Sapotaceae
- Genus: Manilkara
- Species: M. hexandra

Binomial name
- Manilkara hexandra (Roxb.) Dubard

Synonyms
- Mimusops hexandra Roxb. (basionym)

= Manilkara hexandra =

Species of tree

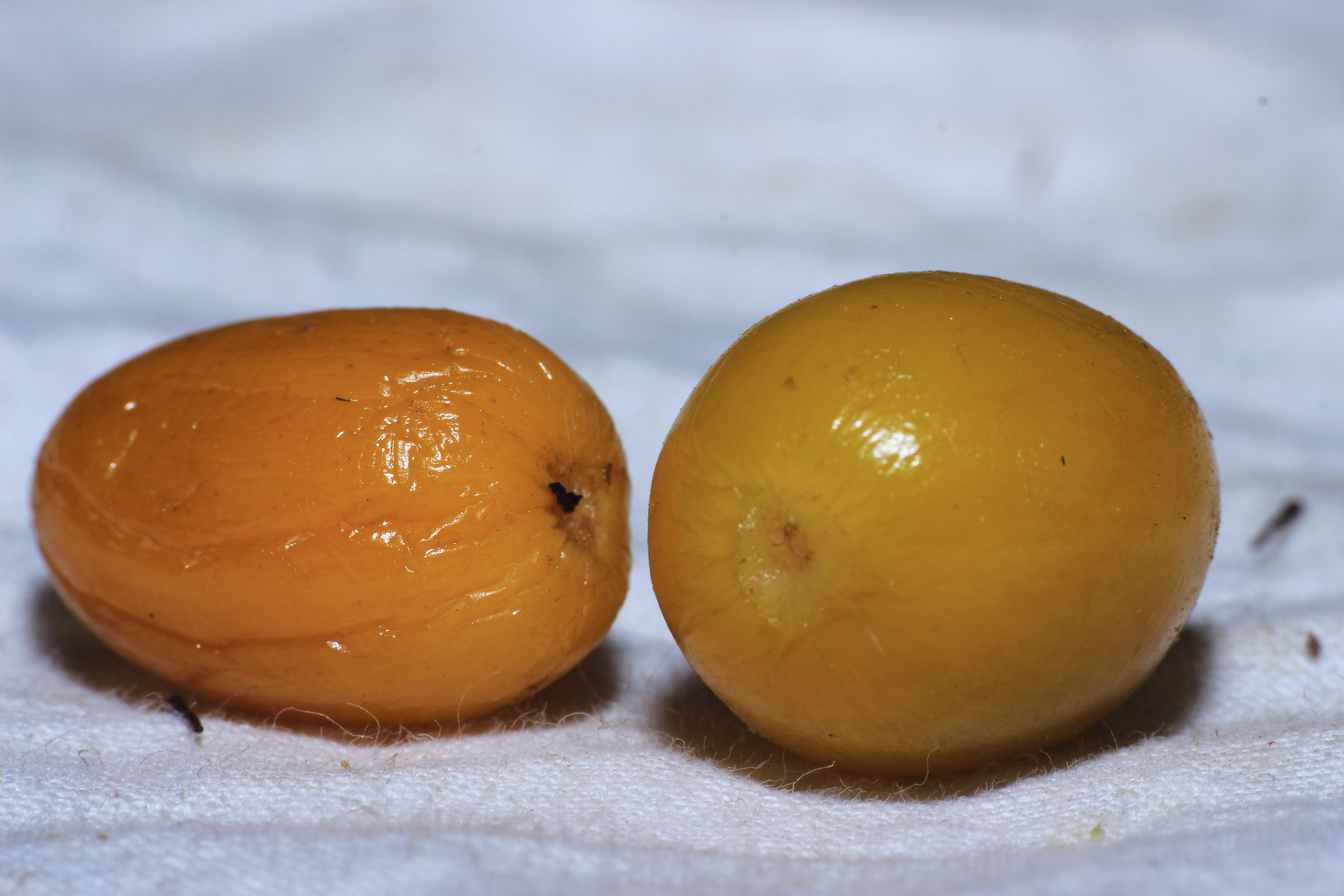
Fruits of Manilkara hexandra

Manilkara hexandra, the milk tree or Ceylon ironwood, is a tree species in the tribe Sapoteae, in the family Sapotaceae. It is native to China; much of the Indian subcontinent: Bangladesh, India, and Sri Lanka; Indo-China: Cambodia, Myanmar, Thailand and Vietnam.

== Description ==
Manilkara hexandra is a slow-growing but fairly large evergreen species. It grows in tropical and temperate forests. The tree typically attains some 12 to 25 metres of height and one to three metres in trunk circumference. The bark is grayish and rough.

== Uses ==
The wood is hard, durable, and heavy; the density is variously reported as ranging from about 0.83 to 1.08 tonnes per cubic metre, partly depending on the degree of drying. It is used for heavy structural work, gate posts, and big beams. but also is used for turning and carpentry in spite of the difficulties of working with such dense wood.

It is used as rootstock for Manilkara zapota, and its own fruit is edible.
