= Manilkara obovata =

Scientific classification
- Kingdom: Plantae
- Clade: Tracheophytes
- Clade: Angiosperms
- Clade: Eudicots
- Clade: Asterids
- Order: Ericales
- Family: Sapotaceae
- Genus: Manilkara
- Species: M. obovata

Binomial name
- Manilkara obovata (Sabine & G.Don) J.H.Hemsl.

Species of plant

Manilkara obovata is an evergreen tree in the Sapotaceae family. Its timber is sold under the name Nkunya in Uganda. The species has a wide distribution from Sierra Leone in West Africa moving east to Uganda in Eastern Africa and southwards to Zambia. It is also considered a variable species having different ecotypes.

== Taxonomy ==
Manilkara obovata is a wide spread and variable species that occurs in West and Central Africa. Chrysoplyllum obovatum, now a synonym of the species showed similarities both in flower appearance and its leaf blade outline and leaf surface with those of Manilkara lacera, both are considered to be part of Manilkara obovata complex of species, though they tend to be smaller and commonly found around rocky rapids and mountains.

== Description ==
A scaly brown barked tree that can grow up to 40 meters tall; tall and mature trees have narrow buttressed roots up to 2 meters, the trunk is straight and up to 25 meters branchless; slash is fibrous, pale-pink with whitish exudate. Leaves, simple, alternate arrangement and tufted at the ends of branches, the stipules are small, grows up to 1.5 mm long; Leaf-blade is narrowly elliptical to obovate in outline, 5-16 cm long and 2-8 cm wide, it has a coriaceous surface that is greyish to green in color and densely pubescent and pale beneath. Flowers are pale yellow to white, clusters of 3-4 on leaf axils, sepals are 6 in two distinct whorls of 3. Fruit is an orange colored berry when ripe that is up to 3 cm long and 1.5 cm in diameter, it is 2-3 seeded.

== Chemistry ==
Test on stem bark, root and leaf extracts of the species identified phenyl-coumarin derivatives, xanthones, saponins, triterpenes and flavonoids. Calophyllic acid, canophyllic acid, and isocalophyllic acid were obtained from extracts of leaves of the species, while xanthones, friedelin, friedelanol and oleanolic acid were obtained from stem bark and root extracts.

== Uses ==
The root is prepared and used as a laxative, while stem bark is used as part of a regimen to treat stomach ailment.
