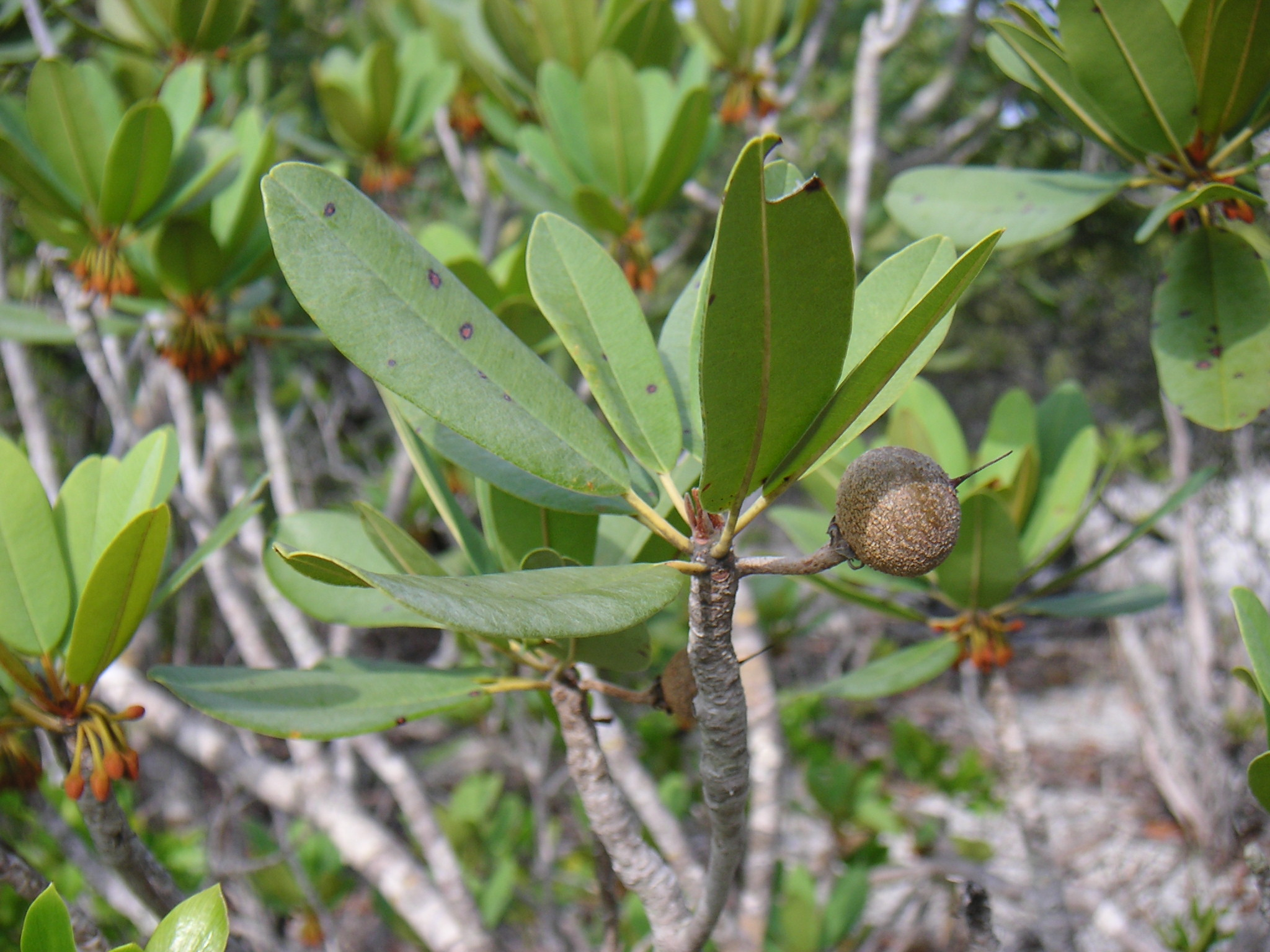
- Manilkara jaimiqui ssp. emarginata branch with developing fruit

Scientific classification
- Kingdom: Plantae
- Clade: Tracheophytes
- Clade: Angiosperms
- Clade: Eudicots
- Clade: Asterids
- Order: Ericales
- Family: Sapotaceae
- Subfamily: Sapotoideae
- Genus: Manilkara; Adans., conserved name

Type species
- Manilkara kauki (L.) Dubard

Synonyms
- Achras L. (rejected name); Sapota Mill. (superfluous name); Stisseria Scop. 1777 illegitimate homonym not Stisseria Heist. ex Fabr. 1759 (Apocynaceae); Hornschuchia Spreng.; Synarrhena Fisch. & C.A.Mey.; Eichleria M.M.Hartog; Muriea M.M.Hartog; Mahea Pierre ex L.Planch.; Northiopsis Kaneh.; Shaferodendron Gilly; Murianthe (Baill.) Aubrév.; Abebaia Baehni; Nispero Aubrév.; Manilkariopsis (Gilly) Lundell; Chiclea Lundell; Mopania Lundell

= Manilkara =

Genus of trees

Manilkara is a genus of trees in the family Sapotaceae. They are widespread in tropical and semitropical locations, in Africa, Madagascar, Asia, Australia, and Latin America, as well as various islands in the Pacific and in the Caribbean. A close relative is the genus Pouteria.

Trees of this genus yield edible fruit, useful wood, and latex. The best-known species are M. bidentata (balatá), M. chicle (chicle) and M. zapota (sapodilla). M. hexandra is the floral emblem of Prachuap Khiri Khan Province in Thailand, where it is known as rayan. M. obovata shares the vernacular name of African pear with another completely different species, Dacryodes edulis, and neither should be confused with Baillonella toxisperma, known by the very similar name, African pearwood.

Manilkara trees are often significant, or even dominant species in their native ecosystems, such as East Deccan dry evergreen forests, Central American premontane tropical wet forests, or together with Cynometra, in the Arabuko Sokoke National Park. Manilkara fruit are an important food item for various frugivores, in particular birds. The red fruit bat (Stenoderma rufum) is the primary – and possibly the only – seed disperser of M. bidentata in parts of the Caribbean. Tuckerella xiamenensis, a species of peacock mite, was described from a sapodilla tree.

== Taxonomy ==
The generic name, Manilkara, is derived from the Malayalam word manil-kara, a vernacular name for M. kauki; it combines Manil from Manilha, the Portuguese name of Manila in the Philippines, and kara meaning "fruit".

== Species ==
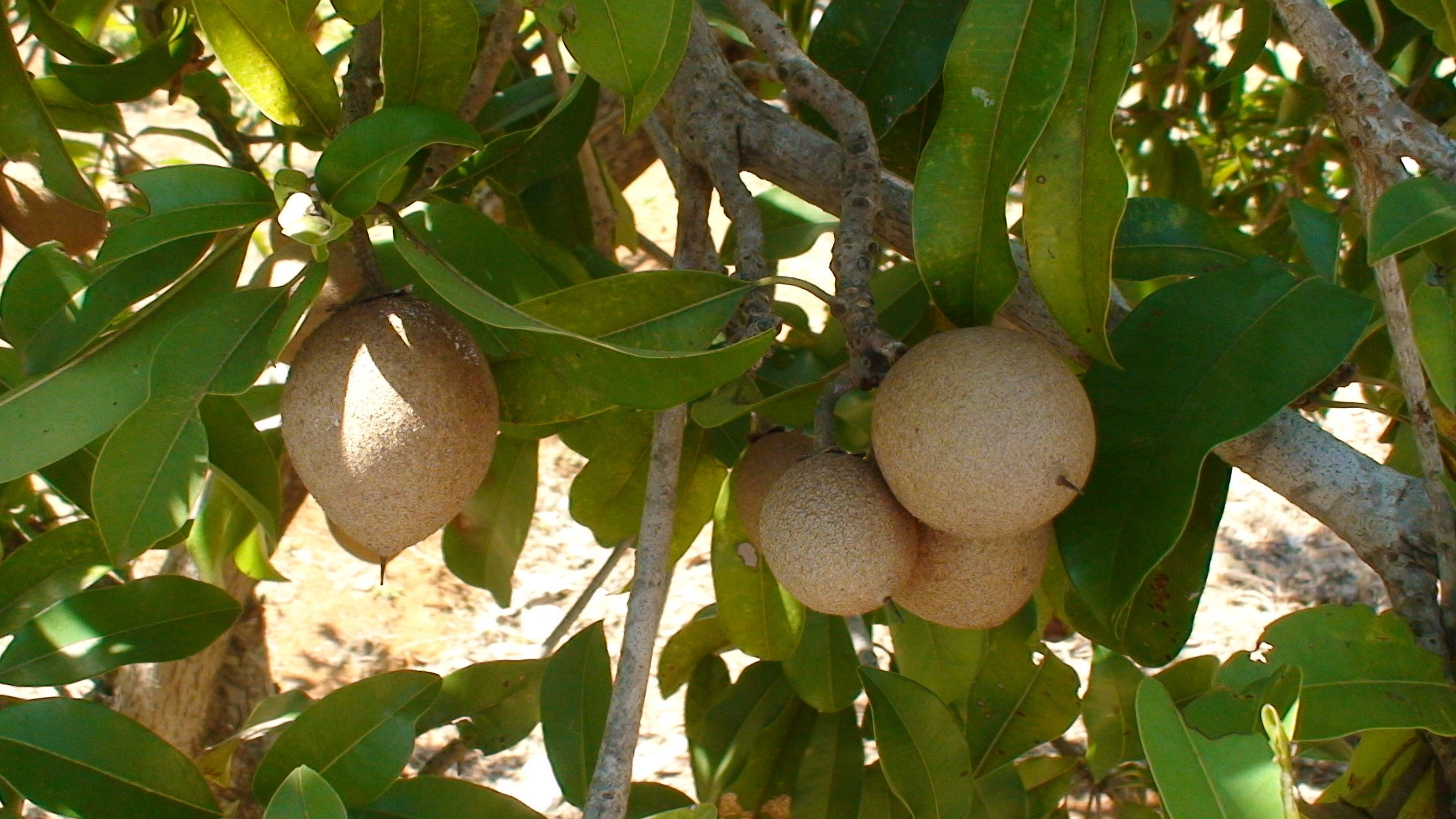
Manilkara zapota plant and fruit in Tamil Nadu, India

Species accepted by Plants of the World Online as of December 2022:

- Manilkara adolfi-friederici (Engl. & K.Krause) H.J.Lam
- Manilkara bequaertii (De Wild.) H.J.Lam
- Manilkara bidentata (A.DC.) A.Chev.
- Manilkara boivinii Aubrév.
- Manilkara bolivarensis T.D.Penn.
- Manilkara butugi Chiov.
- Manilkara capuronii Aubrév.
- Manilkara casteelsii (De Wild.) H.J.Lam
- Manilkara cavalcantei Pires & Rodr. ex T.D.Penn.
- Manilkara celebica H.J.Lam
- Manilkara chicle (Pittier) Gilly
- Manilkara concolor (Harv.) Gerstner
- Manilkara dardanoi Ducke
- Manilkara dawei (Stapf) Chiov.
- Manilkara decrescens T.D.Penn.
- Manilkara discolor (Sond.) J.H.Hemsl.
- Manilkara dissecta (L.f.) Dubard
- Manilkara doeringii (Engl. & K.Krause) H.J.Lam
- Manilkara dukensis (Engl. & K.Krause) H.J.Lam
- Manilkara elata (Allemão ex Miq.) Monach.
- Manilkara excelsa (Ducke) Standl.
- Manilkara excisa (Urb.) H.J.Lam
- Manilkara fasciculata (Warb.) H.J.Lam & Maas Geest.
- Manilkara fischeri (Engl.) H.J.Lam
- Manilkara fouilloyana Aubrév. & Pellegr.
- Manilkara frondosa (Hiern) H.J.Lam
- Manilkara gonavensis (Urb. & Ekman) Gilly ex Cronquist
- Manilkara hexandra (Roxb.) Dubard
- Manilkara hoshinoi (Kaneh.) P.Royen
- Manilkara huberi (Ducke) Standl.
- Manilkara ilendensis (Engl.) H.J.Lam
- Manilkara inundata (Ducke) Ducke
- Manilkara jaimiqui (C.Wright ex Griseb.) Dubard
- Manilkara kanosiensis H.J.Lam & B.Meeuse
- Manilkara kauki (L.) Dubard
- Manilkara koechlinii Aubrév. & Pellegr.
- Manilkara kribensis (Engl.) H.J.Lam
- Manilkara kurziana H.J.Lam & B.Meeuse
- Manilkara letestui Aubrév. & Pellegr.
- Manilkara letouzeyi Aubrév.
- Manilkara littoralis (Kurz) Dubard
- Manilkara longifolia (A.DC.) Dubard
- Manilkara longistyla (De Wild.) C.M.Evrard
- Manilkara lososiana Kenfack & Ewango
- Manilkara mabokeensis Aubrév.
- Manilkara maxima T.D.Penn.
- Manilkara mayarensis (Ekman ex Urb.) Cronquist
- Manilkara microphylla Aubrév. & Pellegr.
- Manilkara mochisia (Baker) Dubard
- Manilkara multifida T.D.Penn.
- Manilkara nicholsonii A.E.van Wyk
- Manilkara obovata (Sabine & G.Don) J.H.Hemsl.
- Manilkara paraensis (Huber) Standl.
- Manilkara pellegriniana Tisser. & Sillans
- Manilkara perrieri Aubrév.
- Manilkara pleeana (Pierre ex Baill.) Cronquist
- Manilkara pobeguinii Pierre ex Dubard
- Manilkara pubicarpa Monach.
- Manilkara roxburghiana (Wight) Dubard
- Manilkara rufula (Miq.) H.J.Lam
- Manilkara sahafarensis Aubrév.
- Manilkara salzmannii (A.DC.) H.J.Lam
- Manilkara samoensis H.J.Lam & B.Meeuse
- Manilkara sansibarensis (Engl.) Dubard
- Manilkara seretii (De Wild.) H.J.Lam
- Manilkara sideroxylon (Griseb.) Dubard
- Manilkara smithiana H.J.Lam & Maas Geest.
- Manilkara spectabilis (Pittier) Standl.
- Manilkara staminodella Gilly
- Manilkara suarezensis Aubrév.
- Manilkara subsericea (Mart.) Dubard
- Manilkara sulcata (Engl.) Dubard
- Manilkara sylvestris Aubrév. & Pellegr.
- Manilkara triflora (Allemão) Monach.
- Manilkara udoido Kaneh.
- Manilkara valenzuelana (A.Rich.) T.D.Penn.
- Manilkara vitiensis (H.J.Lam & Olden) B.Meeuse
- Manilkara zapota (L.) P.Royen
- Manilkara zenkeri Lecomte ex Aubrév. & Pellegr.

Several species are endangered due to overexploitation and habitat destruction. M. gonavensis of Haiti and M. spectabilis of Costa Rica are almost extinct.
