= Malacantha =

Scientific classification
- Kingdom: Plantae
- Clade: Tracheophytes
- Clade: Angiosperms
- Clade: Eudicots
- Clade: Asterids
- Order: Ericales
- Family: Sapotaceae
- Subfamily: Chrysophylloideae
- Genus: Malacantha; Pierre (1891)
- Species: M. alnifolia

Binomial name
- Malacantha alnifolia (Baker) Pierre (1891)

Synonyms
- Chrysophyllum alnifolium Baker (1877); Chrysophyllum ferrugineotomentosum Engl. (1900); Malacantha acutifolia A.Chev. (1920), nom. nud.; Malacantha alnifolia var. sacleuxii (Lecomte) J.H.Hemsl. (1961); Malacantha centralis A.Chev. (1913), nom. nud.; Malacantha ferrugineotomentosa (Engl.) Engl. (1904); Malacantha heudelotiana Pierre (1891); Malacantha obtusa C.H.Wright (1908); Malacantha sacleuxii Lecomte (1923); Malacantha warneckeana Engl. (1904); Pouteria alnifolia (Baker) Roberty (1953); Pouteria alnifolia var. sacleuxii (Lecomte) L.Gaut. (1997)

Genus of flowering plants

Malacantha alnifolia is species of flowering plant in the family Sapotaceae. It is a tree native to tropical Africa. It is the sole species in genus Malacantha.

Malacantha alnifolia is a shrub to a medium-sized tree which can grow up to 25 meters tall. It has a fluted trunk and slightly buttressed base.

== Range and habitat ==
Its range extends across sub-Saharan Africa from Senegal to Ethiopia, and in coastal east Africa from Kenya south to Mozambique.

It is generally an understory tree in lowland rain forest, groundwater forest, and riverine forest from sea level to 600 meters elevation. It grows in deciduous forest in the Coastal forests of eastern Africa, and in mixed deciduous forest in West Africa. It also colonizes woodland areas in West Africa. It is not found in the closed-canopy rain forests of West Africa and the Congo Basin.
