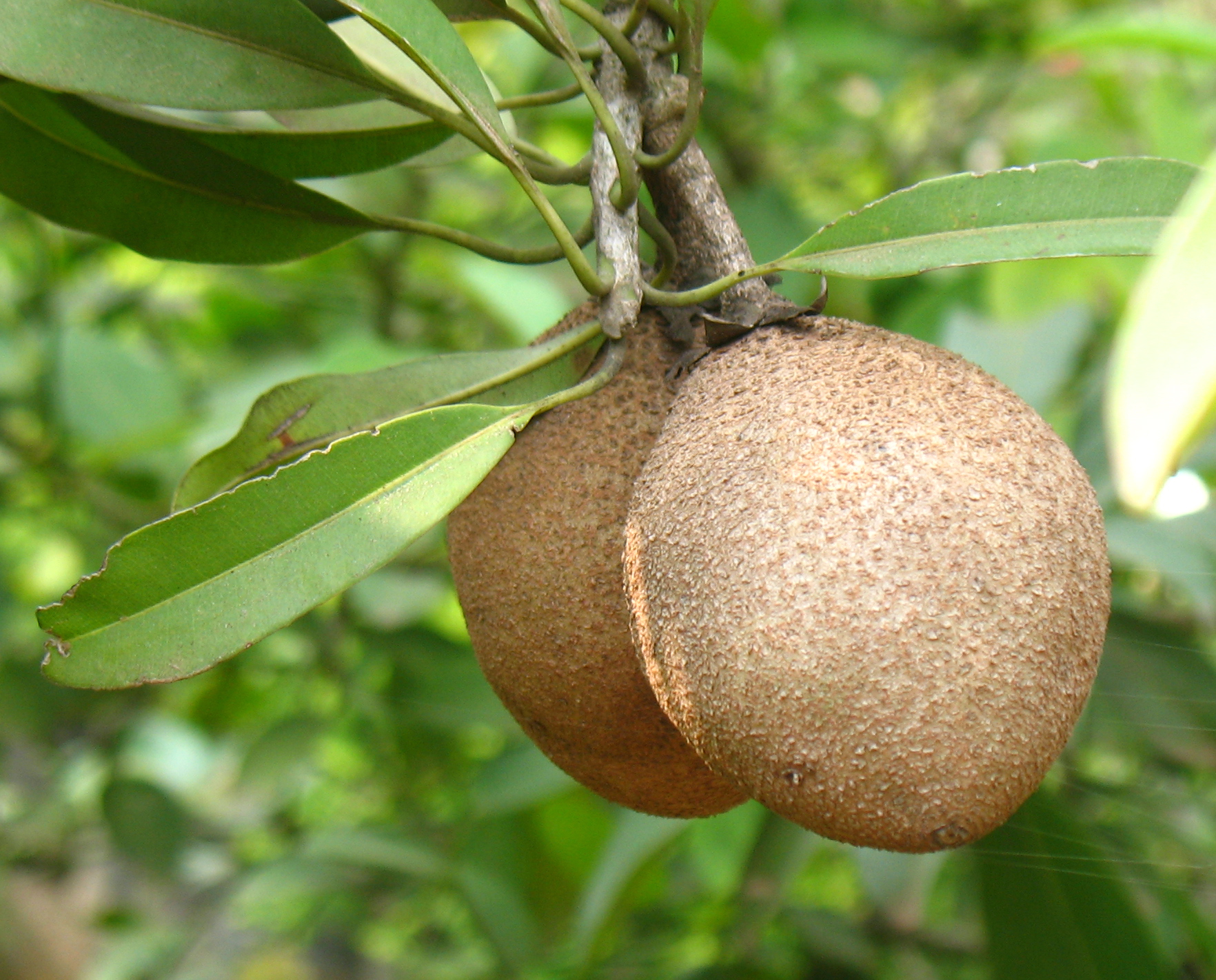

Conservation status
- Least Concern (IUCN 3.1)

Scientific classification
- Kingdom: Plantae
- Clade: Tracheophytes
- Clade: Angiosperms
- Clade: Eudicots
- Clade: Asterids
- Order: Ericales
- Family: Sapotaceae
- Genus: Manilkara
- Species: M. zapota

Binomial name
- Manilkara zapota (L.) P.Royen

Synonyms
- See text

= Manilkara zapota =

Species of tropical evergreen tree

Sapodilla, raw
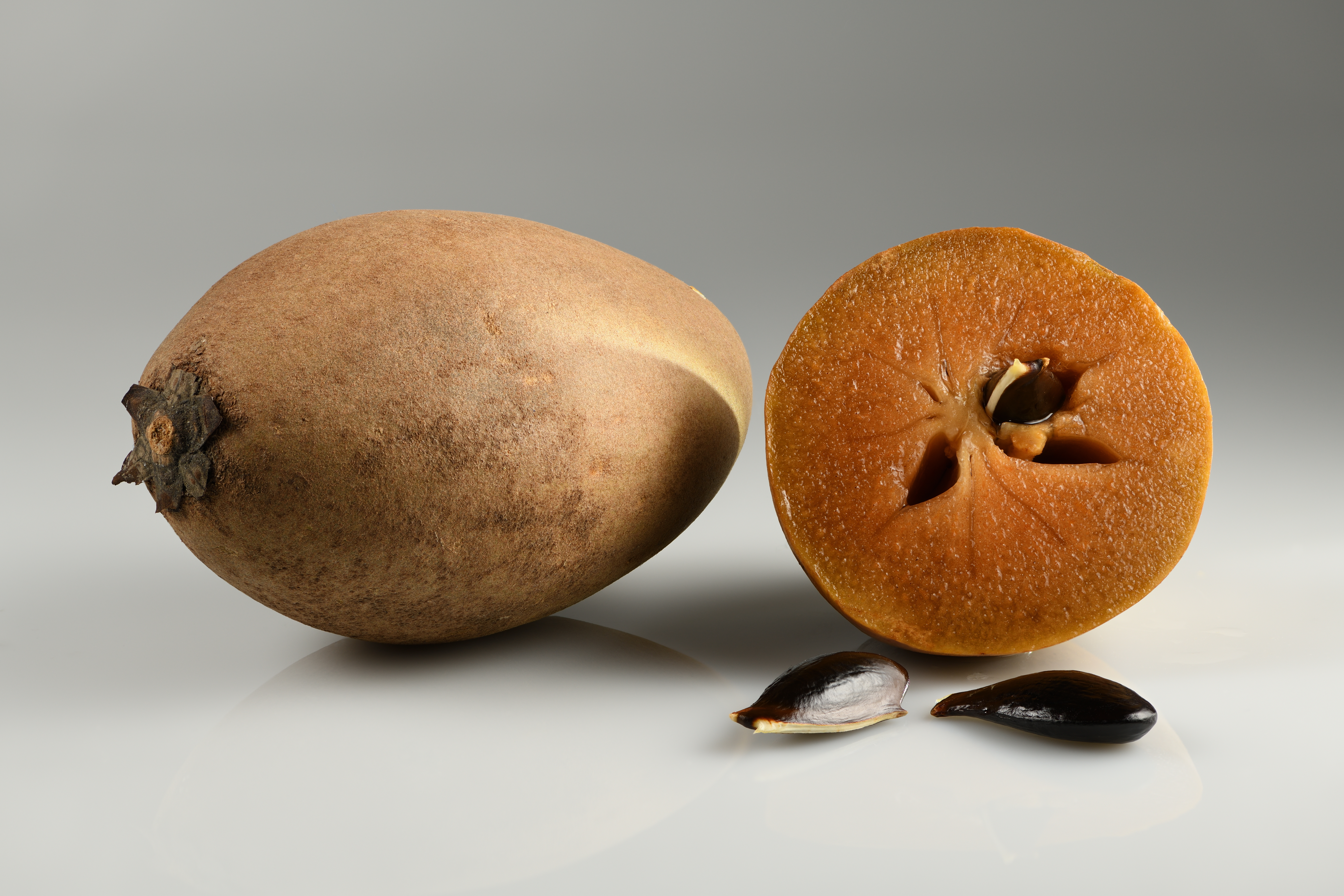
- Fruit, cross-section

Nutritional value per 100 g (3.5 oz)
- Energy: 347 kJ (83 kcal)
- Carbohydrates: 19.96 g
- Dietary fiber: 5.3 g
- Fat: 1.1 g
- Protein: 0.44 g
Vitamins and minerals
Vitamins	Quantity %DV^{†}
Riboflavin (B2)	2% 0.02 mg
Niacin (B3)	1% 0.2 mg
Pantothenic acid (B5)	5% 0.252 mg
Vitamin B6	2% 0.037 mg
Folate (B9)	4% 14 μg
Vitamin C	16% 14.7 mg
Minerals	Quantity %DV^{†}
Calcium	2% 21 mg
Iron	4% 0.8 mg
Magnesium	3% 12 mg
Phosphorus	1% 12 mg
Potassium	6% 193 mg
Sodium	1% 12 mg
Zinc	1% 0.1 mg
- Link to USDA Database entry
- ^{†}Percentages estimated using US recommendations for adults, except for potassium, which is estimated based on expert recommendation from the National Academies.

Manilkara zapota, commonly known as sapodilla (Spanish: [ˌsapoˈðiʝa]), sapote, chicozapote, chico, chicoo, chicle, naseberry, nispero, or soapapple, among other names, is an evergreen tree native to southern Mexico and Central America. An example of natural occurrence is in coastal Yucatán, in the Petenes mangroves ecoregion, where it is a subdominant plant species. It was introduced to the Philippines during Spanish colonization. It is grown in large quantities in Mexico and in tropical Asia, including India, Pakistan, Thailand, Malaysia, Maldives, Cambodia, Indonesia, Vietnam, Bangladesh, as well as in the Caribbean.

== Common names ==
Most of the common names of Manilkara zapota like "sapodilla", "chiku", and "chicozapote" come from Spanish meaning "little sapote". Other common names in English include bully tree, soapapple tree, sawo, marmalade plum and dilly tree.

The specific epithet zapota is from the Spanish zapote [saˈpote], which ultimately derives from the Nahuatl word tzapotl used for other similar-looking fruits.

== Description ==
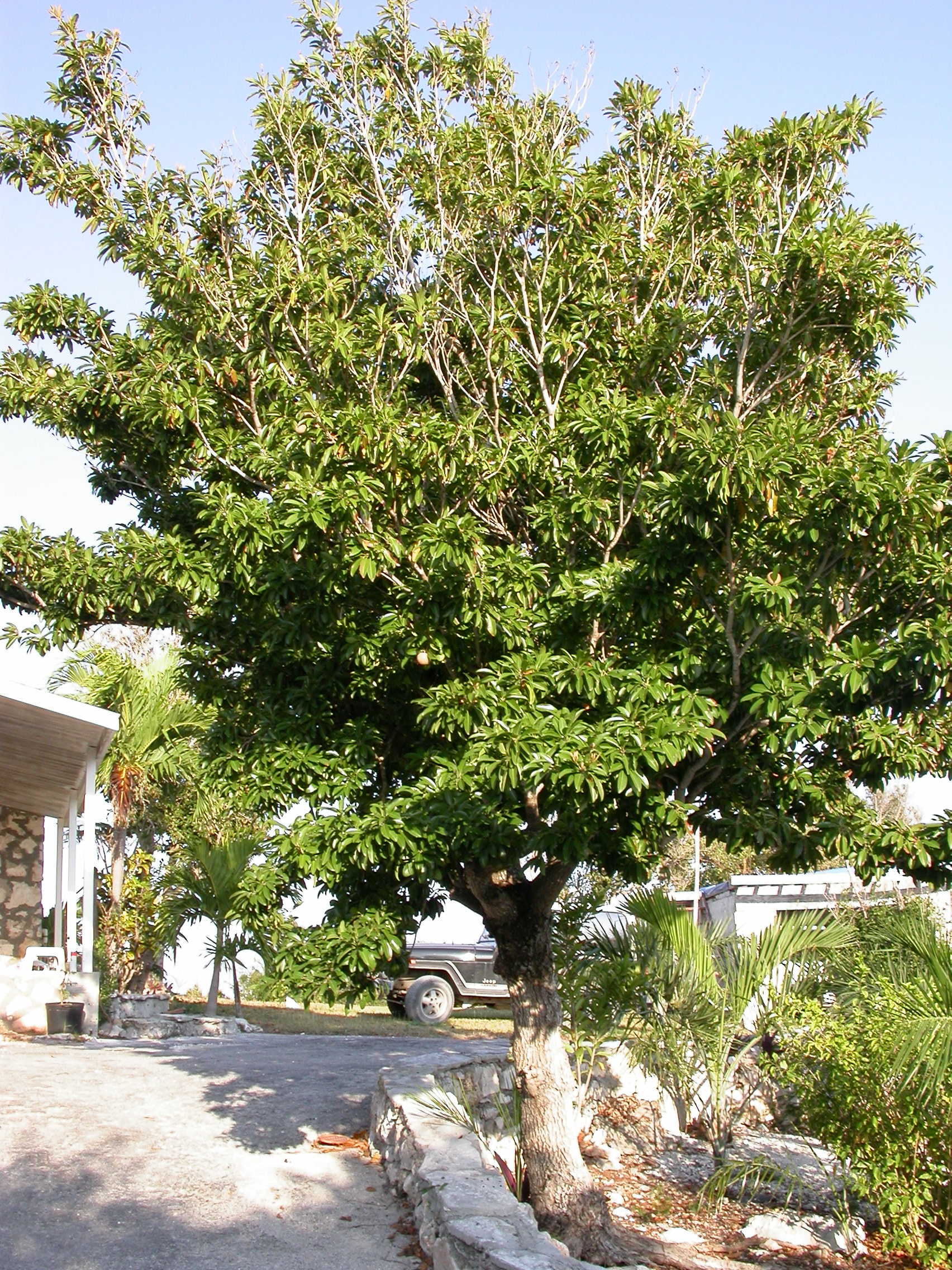
Sapodilla tree

A sapodilla tree can live up to one hundred years. It can grow to more than 30 m (98 ft) tall with a trunk diameter of up to 1.5 m (5 ft); but the average height of cultivated specimens is usually between 9 and 15 m (30 and 49 ft) with a trunk diameter not exceeding 50 cm (20 in). It is wind-resistant and the bark is rich in a white, gummy latex called chicle. Its leaves are elliptic to ovate 6–15 cm (2–6 in) long with entire margins on 1–3 cm (0–1 in) long petioles; they are medium green and glossy with brown and slightly furry midribs. They are arranged alternately.

The trees can survive only in warm, typically tropical environments (although it has low tolerance to drought and heat in its early years), dying easily if the temperature drops below freezing. From germination, the sapodilla tree will usually take anywhere from five to eight years to bear fruit. The sapodilla trees yield fruit twice a year, though flowering may continue year round.

The white flowers are inconspicuous and bell-like, with a six-lobed corolla.

=== Fruit ===
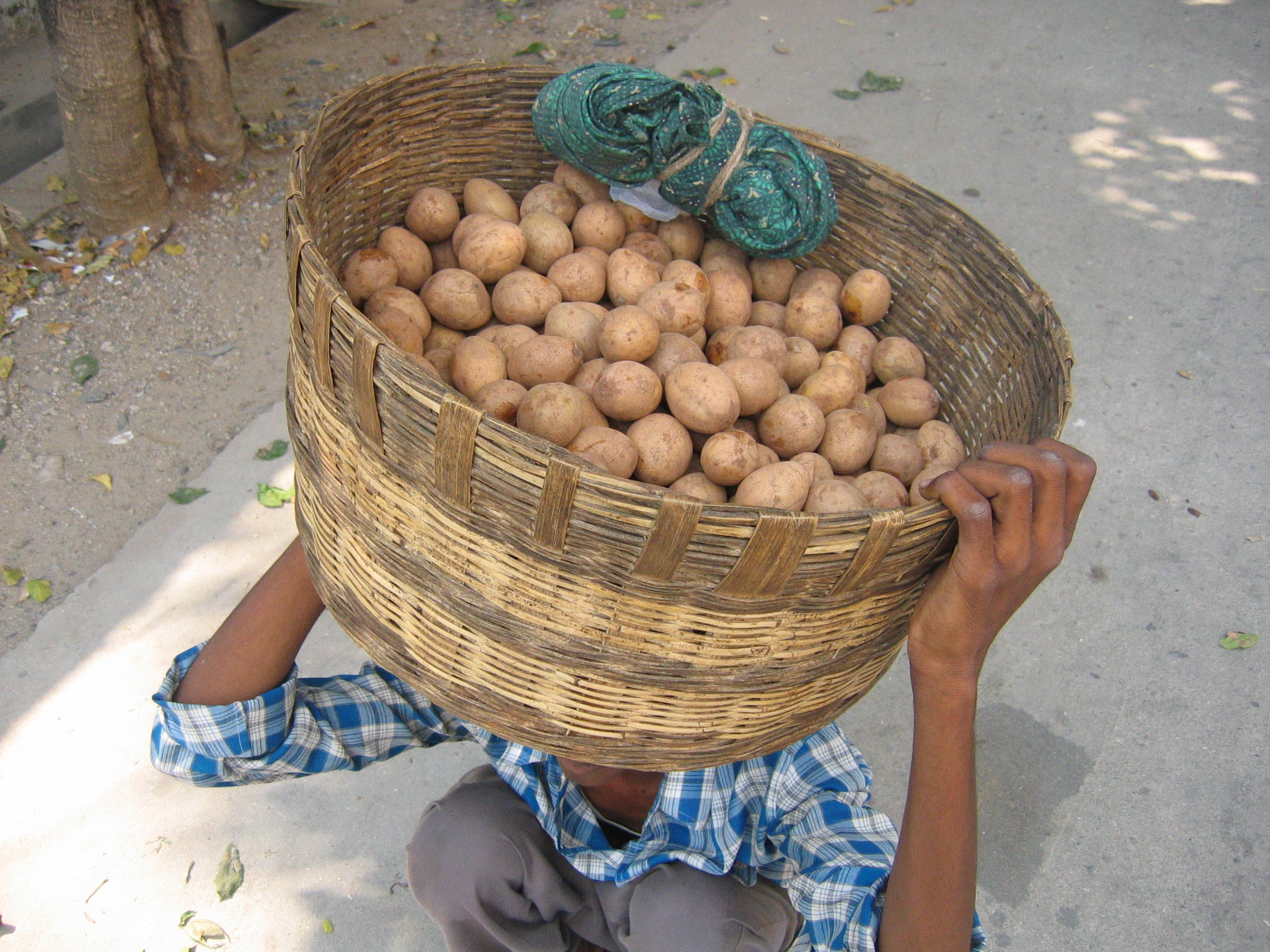
Sapodilla fruits being sold on a street in Guntur, Andhra Pradesh, India

The fruit is a large berry, 4–8 cm (2–3 in) in diameter. An unripe fruit has a firm outer skin and when picked, releases white latex (chicle) from its stem. A fully ripened fruit has saggy skin and does not release chicle when picked. Inside, its flesh ranges from a pale yellow to an earthy brown color with a grainy texture akin to that of a well-ripened pear. Each fruit contains one to six seeds. The seeds are hard, glossy, and black, resembling beans, with a hook at one end that can catch in the throat if swallowed.

The ripe fruit has a particularly sweet, malty flavor. The unripe fruit is hard to the touch and contains high amounts of saponin, which has astringent properties similar to tannin.

== Biological studies ==
Compounds extracted from the leaves showed anti-diabetic, antioxidant and hypocholesterolemic (cholesterol-lowering) effects in rats.

Acetone extracts of the seeds exhibited in vitro antibacterial effects against strains of Pseudomonas oleovorans and Vibrio cholerae.

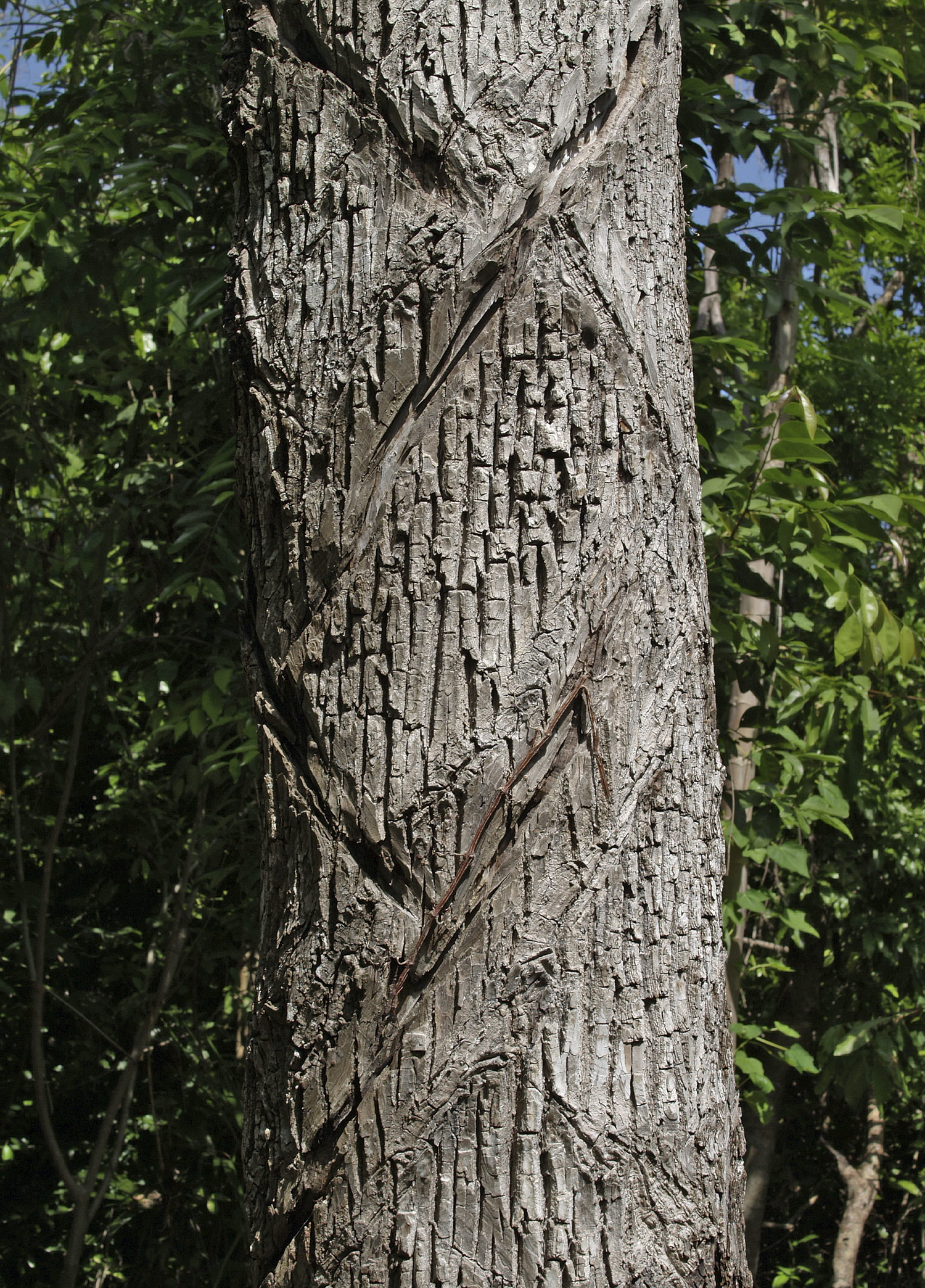

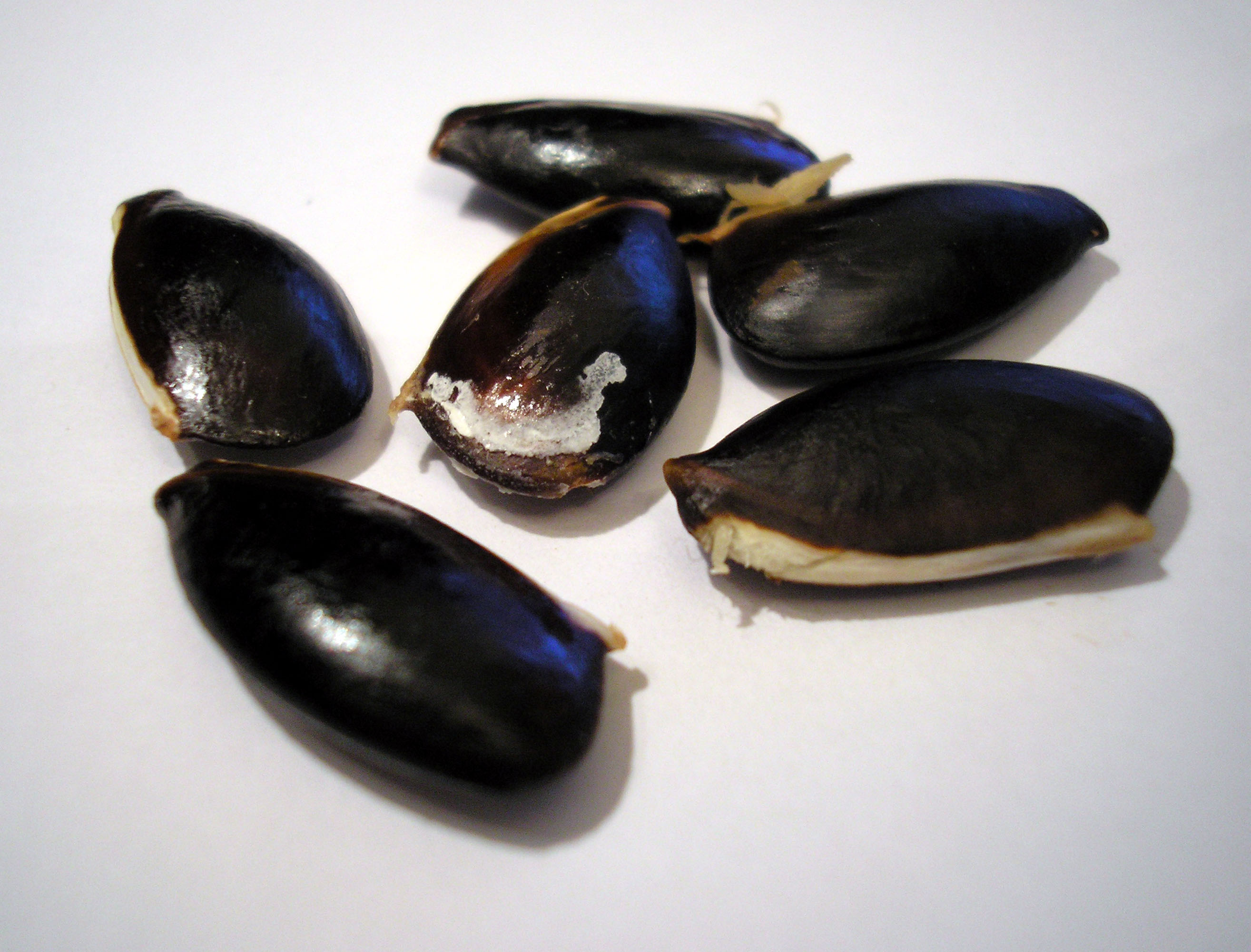

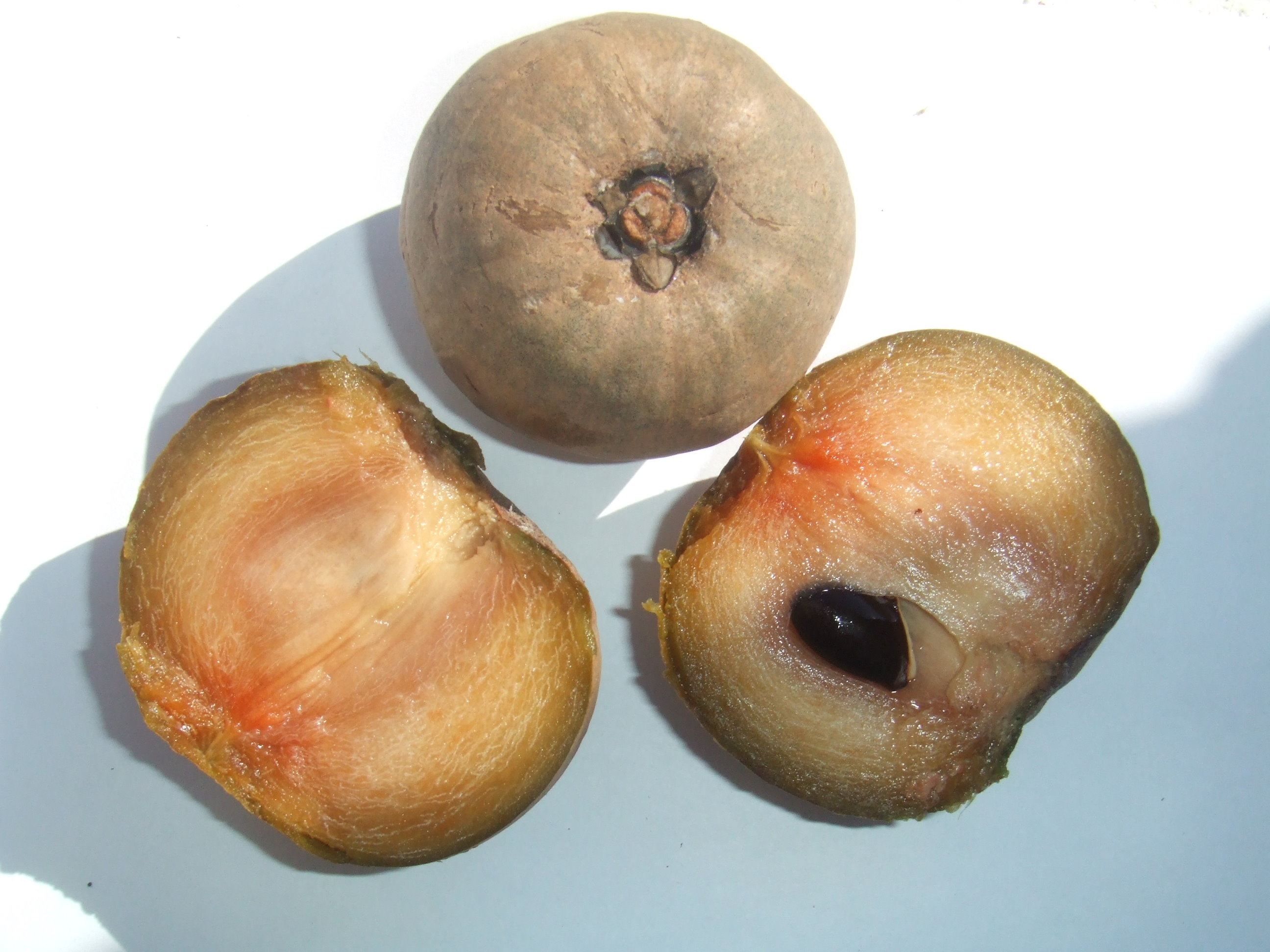

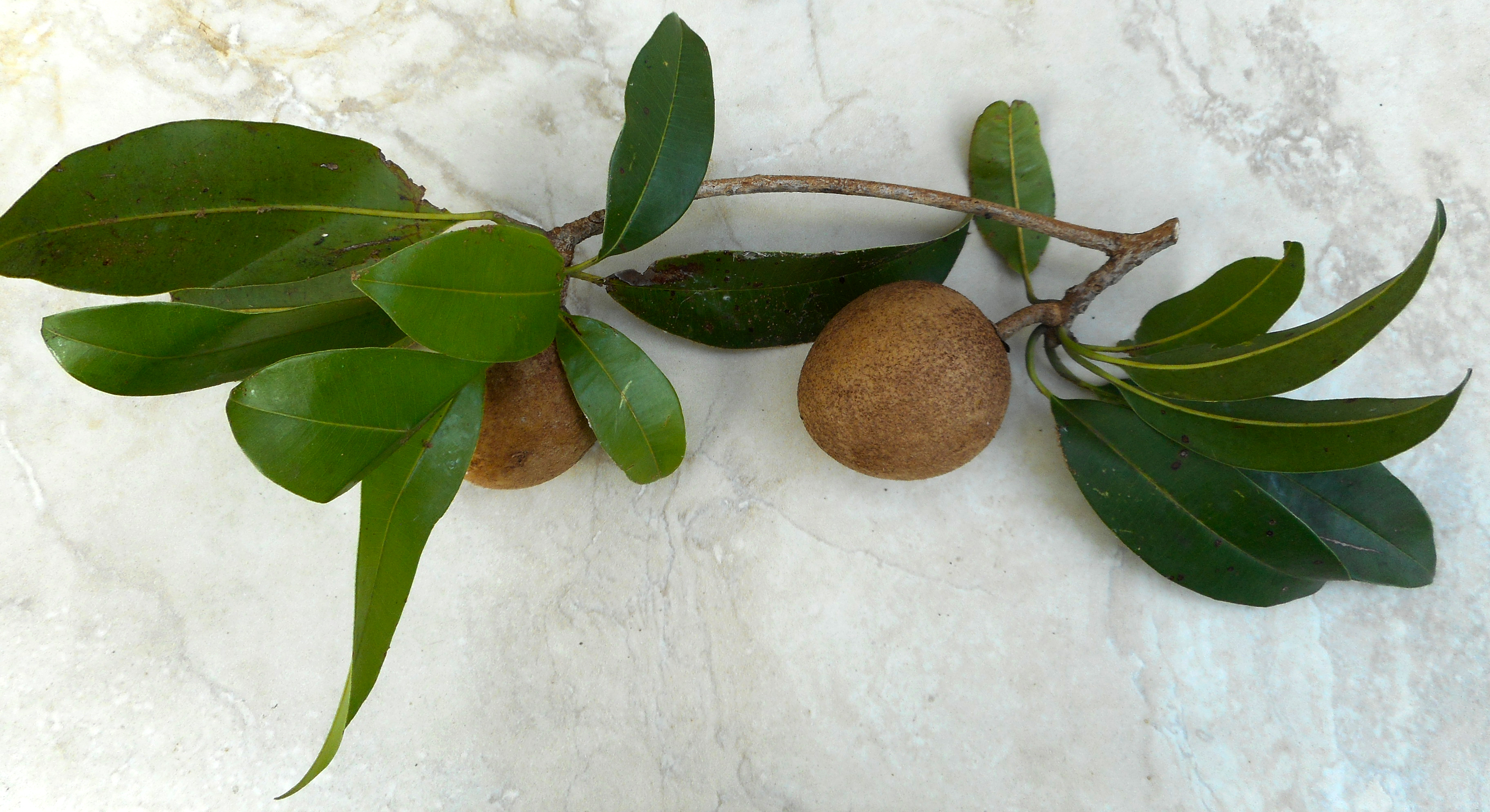

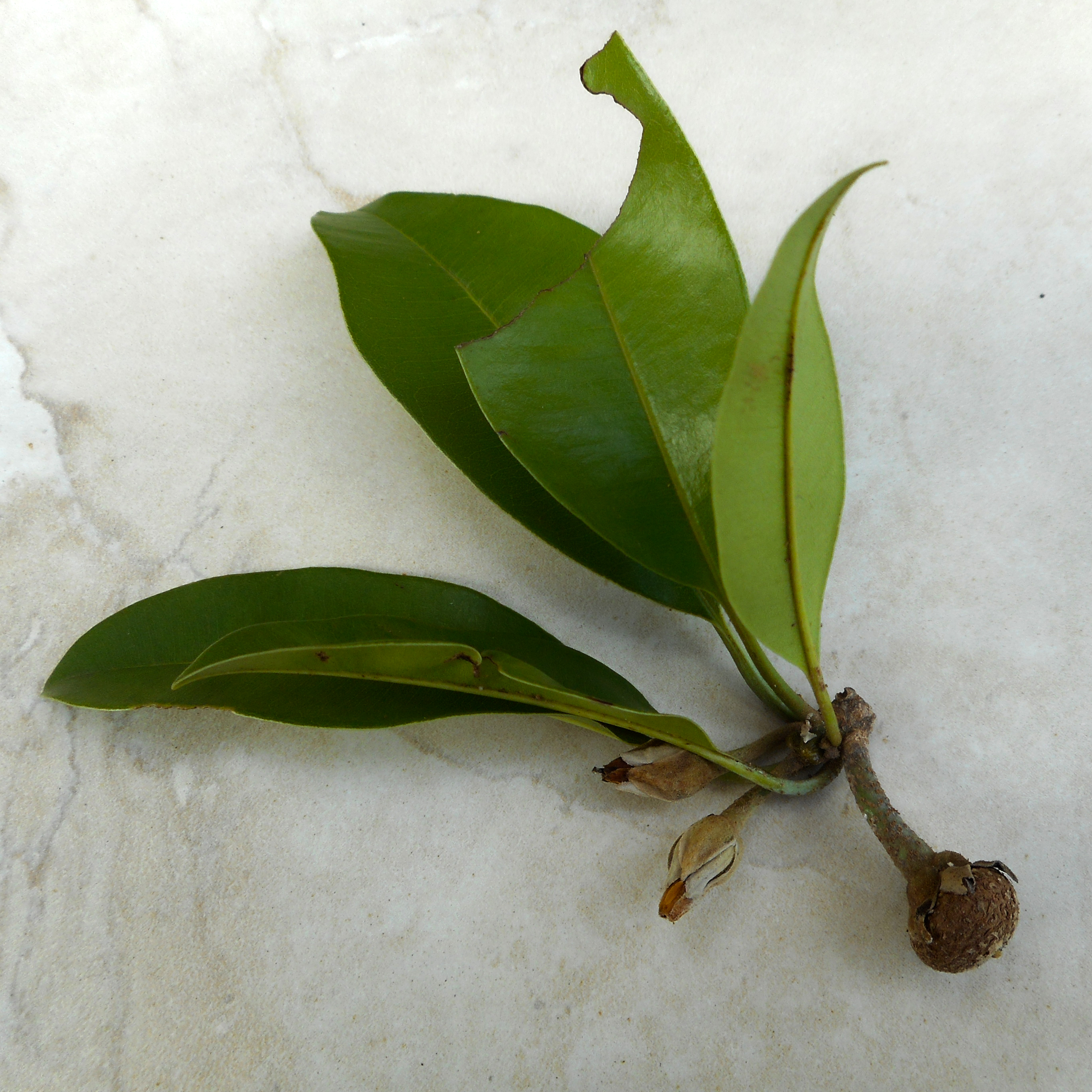

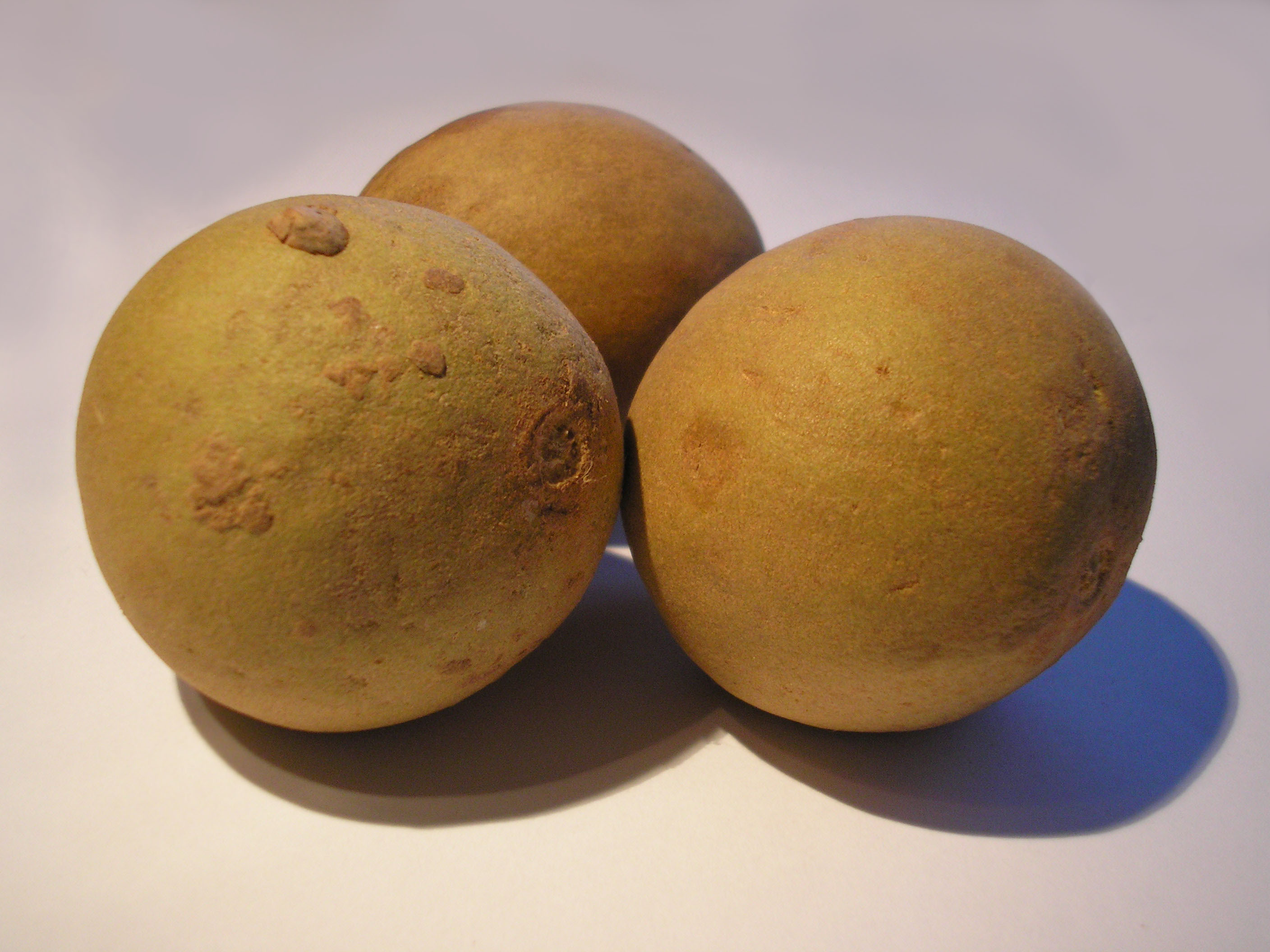

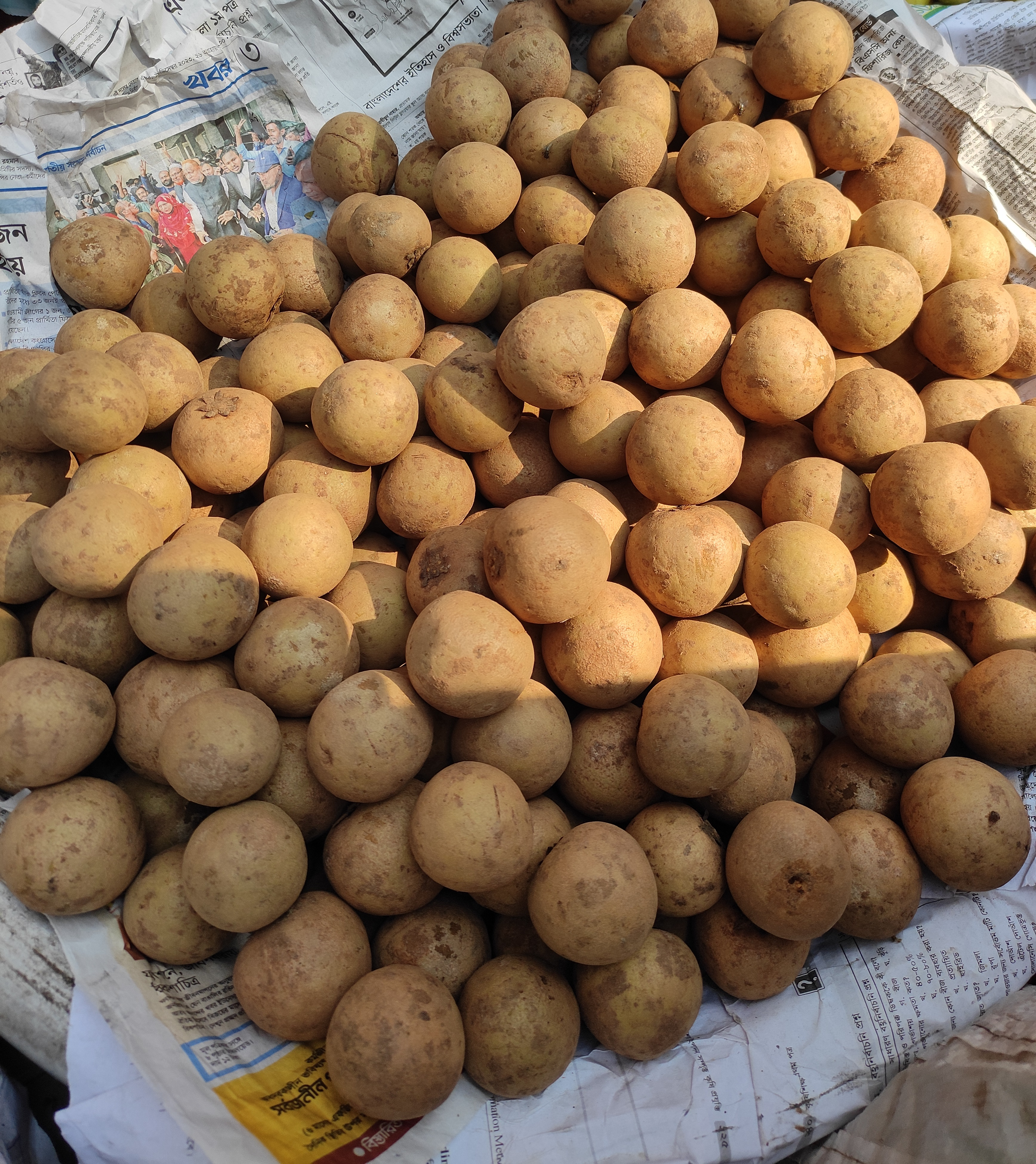

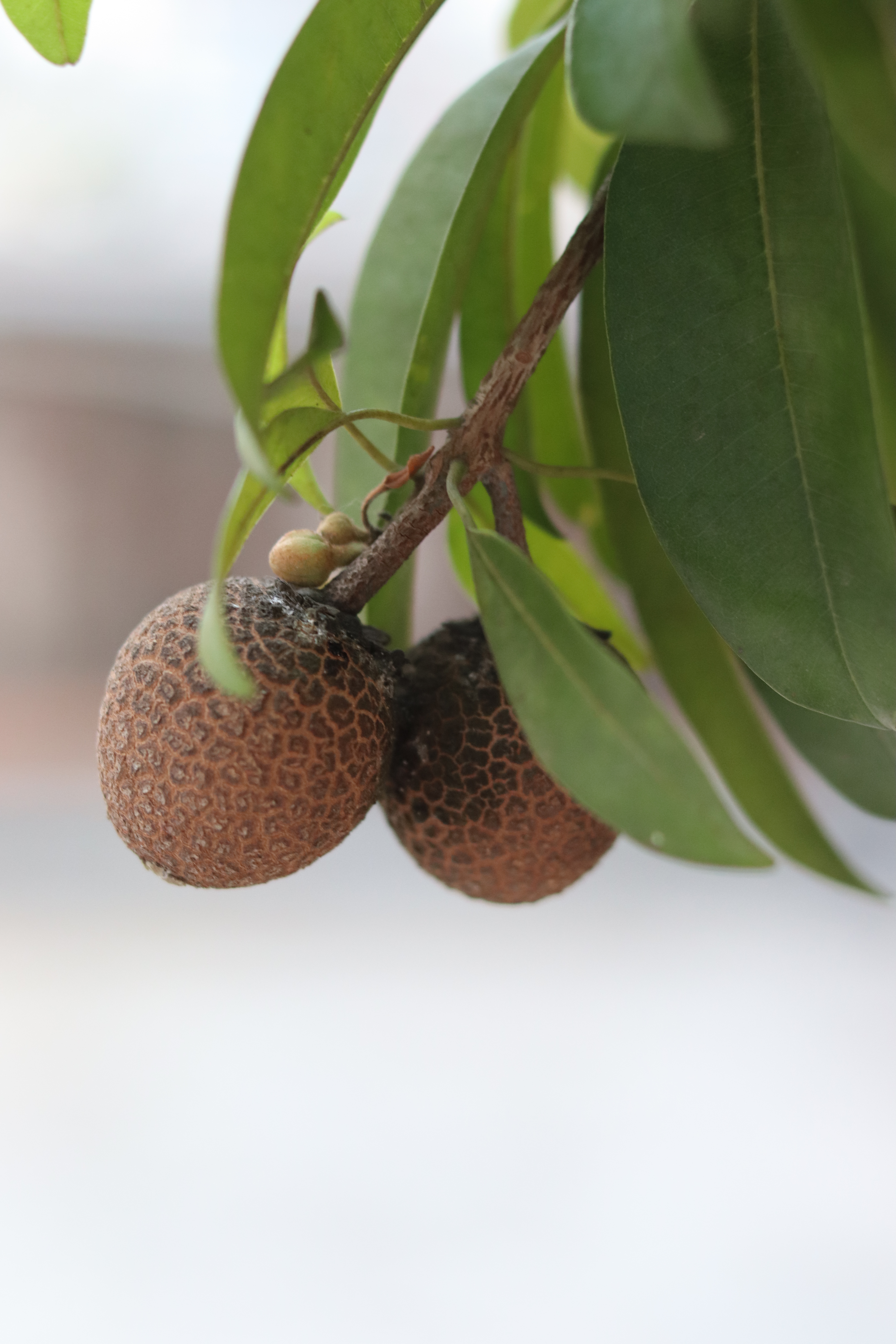

== Synonyms ==
Synonyms of this species include:

- Achradelpha mammosa (L.) O.F.Cook
- Achras breviloba (Gilly) Lundell
- Achras calderonii (Gilly) Lundell
- Achras conzattii (Gilly) Lundell
- Achras coriacea Lundell
- Achras dactylina Lundell
- Achras gaumeri (Gilly) Lundell
- Achras latiloba Lundell
- Achras lobulata (Lundell) Lundell
- Achras lucuma Blanco
- Achras mammosa L. nom. illeg.
- Achras meridionalis (Gilly) Lundell
- Achras occidentalis Cels ex Ten.
- Achras paludosa Lundell
- Achras petenensis (Lundell) Lundell
- Achras rojasii (Gilly) Lundell
- Achras sapatilla J.Paul & W.Arnold
- Achras sapota L. [Spelling variant]
- Achras striata (Gilly) Lundell
- Achras tabogaensis (Gilly) Lundell
- Achras tainteriana Lundell
- Achras tchicoomame Perr.
- Achras verrucosa Stokes
- Achras zapota L.
- Achras zapotilla (Jacq.) Nutt.
- Calocarpum mammosum (L.) Pierre
- Calospermum mammosum (L.) Pierre
- Gambeya mammosa (L.) Pierre
- Lucuma mammosa (L.) C.F.Gaertn.
- Lucuma zapota (L.) Urb.
- Manilkara achras (Mill.) Fosberg
- Manilkara breviloba Gilly
- Manilkara calderonii Gilly
- Manilkara conzattii Gilly
- Manilkara gaumeri Gilly
- Manilkara grisebachii (Pierre) Dubard
- Manilkara meridionalis Gilly
- Manilkara rojasii Gilly
- Manilkara striata Gilly
- Manilkara tabogaensis Gilly
- Manilkara zapotilla (Jacq.) Gilly
- Manilkariopsis lobulata Lundell
- Manilkariopsis meridionalis (Gilly) Lundell
- Manilkariopsis petenensis Lundell
- Manilkariopsis rojasii (Gilly) Lundell
- Manilkariopsis striata (Gilly) Lundell
- Manilkariopsis tabogaensis (Gilly) Lundell
- Mimusops grisebachii Pierre
- Nispero achras (Mill.) Aubrév.
- Pouteria mammosa (L.) Cronquist
- Sapota achras Mill.
- Sapota zapotilla (Jacq.) Coville ex Safford
- Vitellaria mammosa (L.) Radlk.

== Uses ==
The fruit is edible and a favorite in the tropical Americas. Chicle from the bark is used to make chewing gum.

== See also ==
- Sapote
