= Udawalawe =

Town in Ratnapura District, Sri Lanka

Udawalawe උදවලව
- Town
- Location in Sri Lanka
- Coordinates: 6°28′N 80°53′E
- Country: Sri Lanka
- Province: Sabaragamuwa Province
- District: Ratnapura District
- Time zone: UTC+5:30 (Sri Lanka Standard Time)

Udawalawe (උදවලව; also spelled Udawalawa) is a town in the southern part of the Ratnapura District in Sabaragamuwa Province, Sri Lanka. It lies near the district boundary with the Hambantota District and Monaragala District, approximately 165 km (103 mi) southeast of Colombo.

== Geography ==
The town is situated in the dry zone of southern Sri Lanka, in the lowland plains south of the central highlands. The Walawe River, one of the major rivers in southern Sri Lanka, flows through the area. The river's catchment above the town covers 1,152 km^{2} (445 sq mi). The surrounding landscape includes scrubland, grassland, and remnant forest.

== Reservoir and dam ==
The Udawalawe Dam and Reservoir were constructed as part of the Walawe Ganga Scheme, completed in 1965. The dam, comprising both embankment and gravity sections, has a total length of approximately 3.9 km (2.4 mi) and crosses the Walawe River. The reservoir has a total capacity of 267 million cubic metres and a surface area of 3,415 ha (8,440 acres). It extends approximately 8.6 km (5.3 mi) in length and 7 km (4.3 mi) in width.

The reservoir's primary purpose is irrigation, supplying water to agricultural land in the surrounding region. The Walawe Ganga Scheme also involved the construction of Chandrika Wewa (448 ha (1,110 acres)) and Ridiyagama Reservoir (888 ha (2,190 acres)).

== Power station ==
The Udawalawe Power Station, operated by the Ceylon Electricity Board, was commissioned in April 1969. It has an installed capacity of 6 MW, generated by three 2 MW turbine units manufactured by CKD Blansko of Czechoslovakia. The station produces an estimated 8 GWh annually. Water levels in the reservoir are regulated by five tainter gate spillways at the eastern end of the dam and two additional spillways near the centre.

== National park ==
The town is the main entry point to Udawalawe National Park, established on 30 June 1972 to provide a sanctuary for wildlife displaced by the reservoir's construction and to protect the reservoir's catchment. The park covers 30,821 ha (76,160 acres) and is the third most visited national park in Sri Lanka. It is known for its large population of Sri Lankan elephants.

== Gallery ==
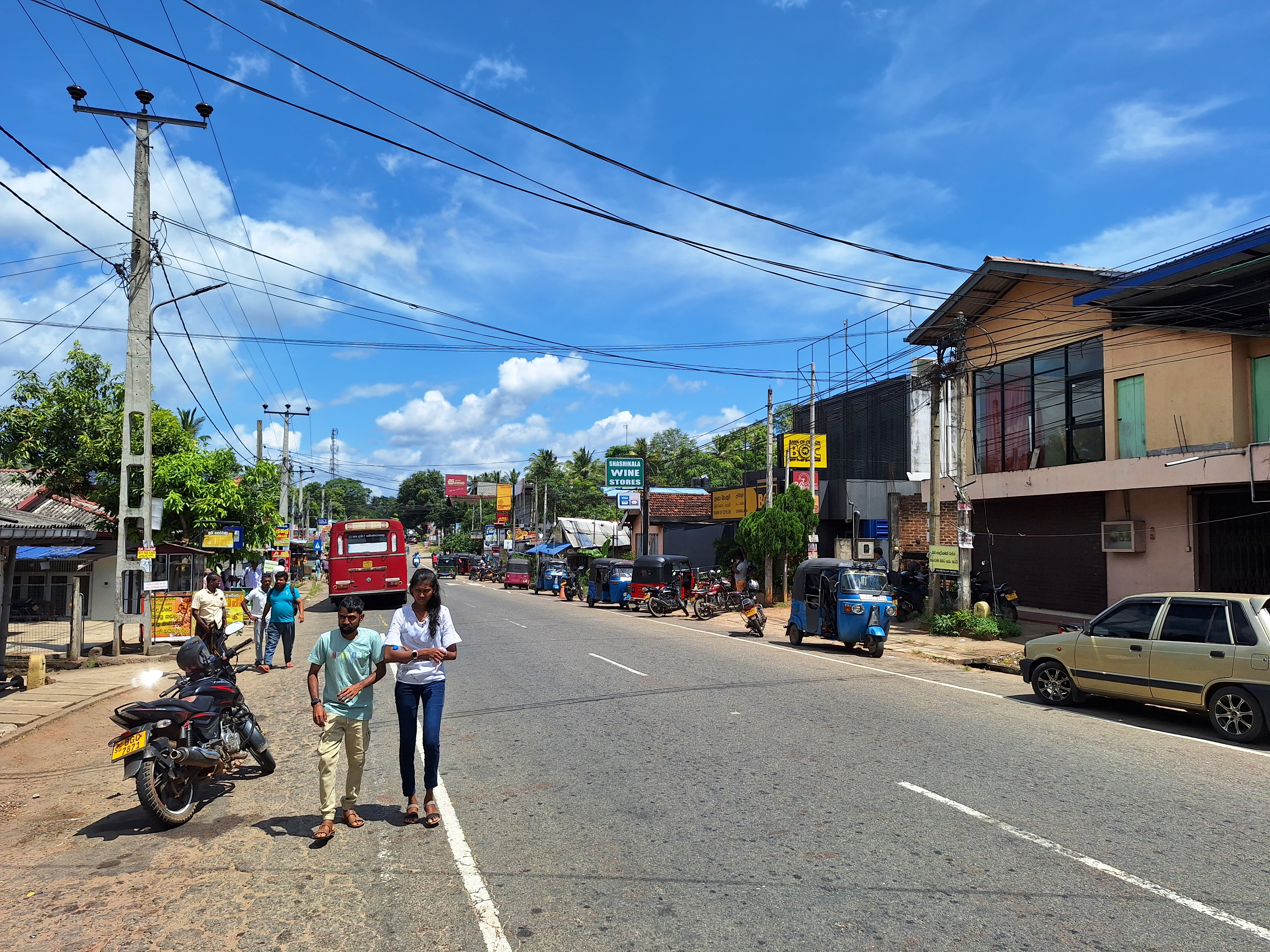
Udawalawe, Sri Lanka; Pelmadulla – Embilipitiya Highway (2024)

== See also ==
- Udawalawe National Park
- Udawalawe Dam
- Walawe River
