= Kamala (elephant) =

Asian elephant (c. 1975–2024)

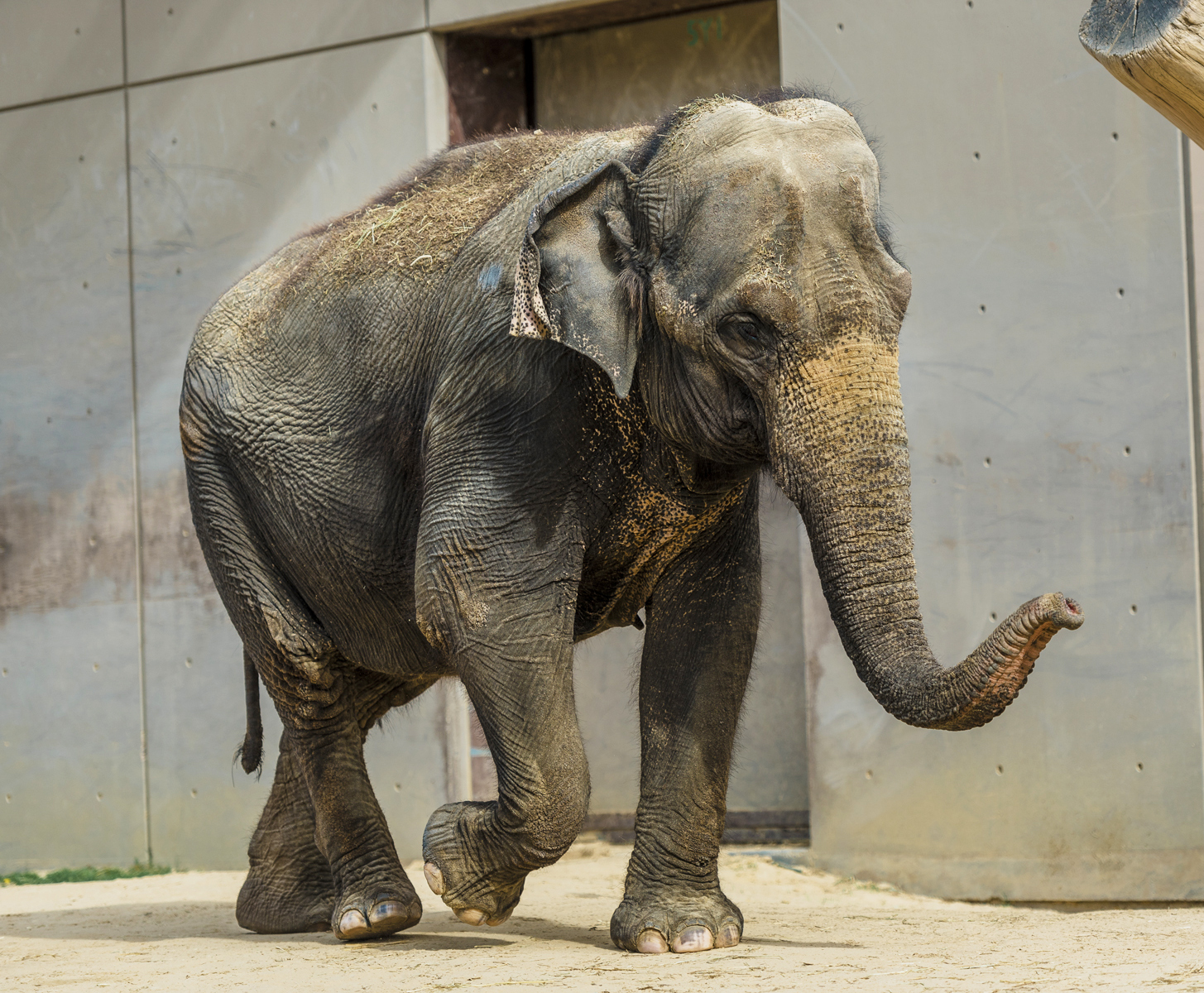
- Kamala in March 2016
- Species: Sri Lankan elephant (Elephas maximus maximus)
- Sex: Female
- Born: c. 1975; Yala National Park, Sri Lanka
- Died: November 2, 2024 (aged 48–49); National Zoological Park, Washington D.C., United States
- Cause of death: Animal euthanasia
- Offspring: Calvin (August 1986 – 2015); Maharani (b. July 1990)

Kamala (c. 1975 – November 2, 2024) was a female Sri Lankan elephant who lived in Calgary Zoo in Canada and the National Zoological Park in the United States. Born in Sri Lanka, Kamala was orphaned as an infant and taken into the Pinnawala Elephant Orphanage. She was bought by the Calgary Zoo and transported to Canada in 1976; the zoo hoped to use her and two other elephants they bought at from Pinnawala to establish their own herd. The breeding program began in the 1980s, and Kamala produced three calves, two of which survived past infancy. Her eldest, Calvin, was the first Sri Lankan elephant born in captivity outside Sri Lanka.

While in Calgary, Kamala became known internationally for her paintings and was featured on episodes of 60 Minutes and PrimeTime Live. Calgary Zoo sold her paintings to fund zoo activities, but in 2005 one of her paintings was auctioned off for CA$6,350 as part of a fundraiser for the Red Cross after the 2004 Indian Ocean Earthquake and tsunami. Citing concerns about the elephant's welfare, Calgary Zoo decided to close their elephant exhibit in 2012; Kamala and her female herdmates were transferred to the National Zoological Park two years later. While in the United States, she developed osteoarthritis, and by 2024 her condition had deteriorated to the point her keepers elected to euthanize her.

== Life ==
=== Calgary Zoo ===
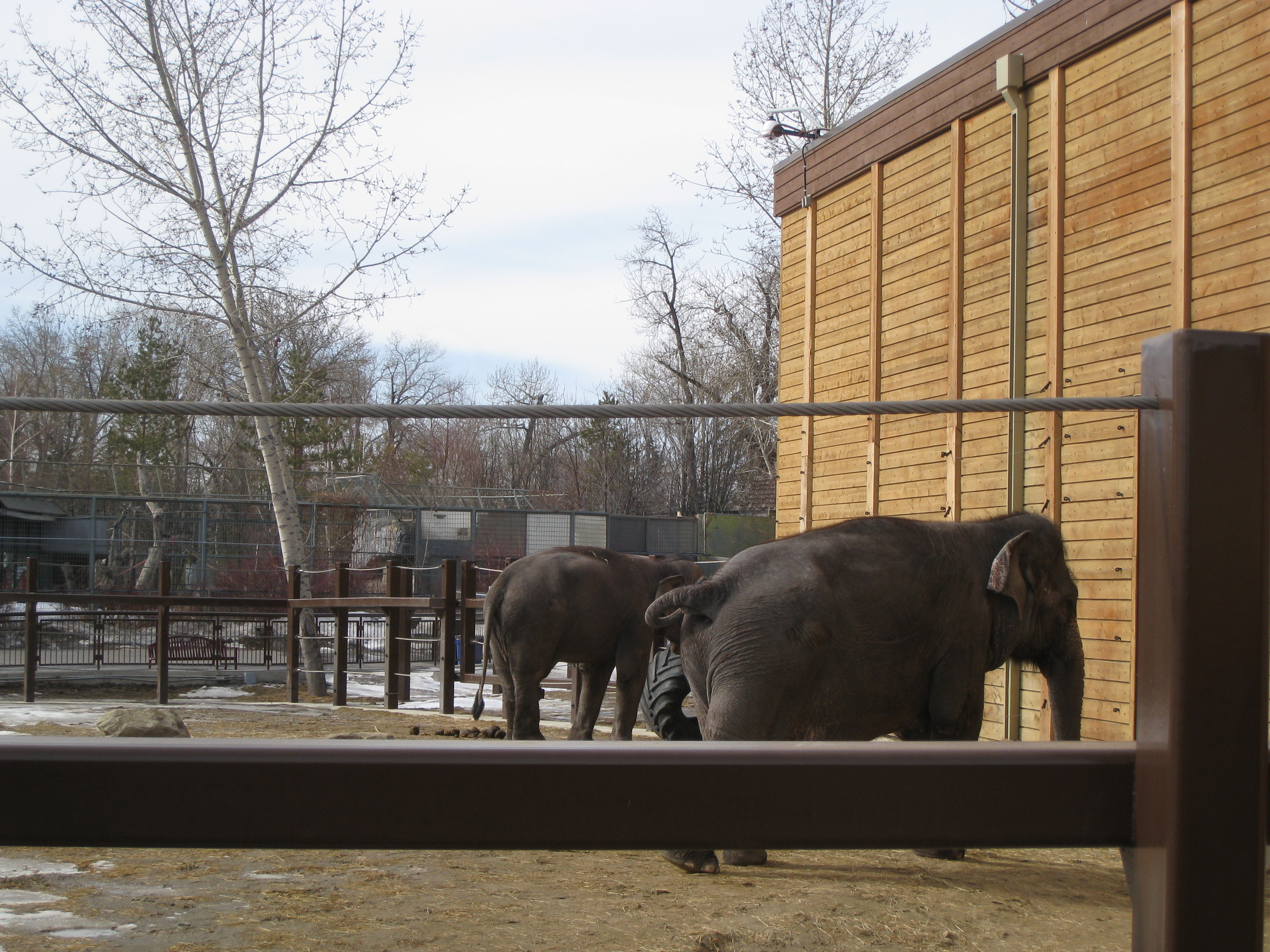
The elephant enclosure at Calgary Zoo in 2009.

Kamala was born in the wild in Yala National Park, Sri Lanka, around 1975. She became orphaned at the age of five months, after which she was taken into the care of the Pinnawala Elephant Orphanage. In 1976, she was sent to the Calgary Zoo in Alberta, Canada. Intending to set up their own herd of Asian elephants, the zoo had purchased her from the orphanage alongside the male Bandara and female Swarna. At the time of their arrival, the trio made up the largest group of Sri Lankan elephants in North America. Attempts to start the breeding program began in 1984, and Kamala gave birth to three calves, two of which survived past infancy, both sired by Bandara. Chanda, a male, was born in August 11, 1986, and weighed 293 lb (133 kg) at birth. Later known as Calvin, he was the first Sri Lankan elephant to be born in captivity outside Sri Lanka.

After Calvin's birth, Kamala became ill for a period of several days. A cause was not established, but zookeepers suspected it was a neurological virus such as eastern equine encephalitis. Kamala lost control of her trunk and had difficulties standing. During her illness, she was repeatedly helped and held upright by Swarna. Calvin was moved to the African Lion Safari in 1986, and would go on to sire fourteen children by the time of his death in 2015. Kamala's younger offspring, the female Maharani, was born on July 14, 1990, and weighed 150 kg (330 lb).

In 1991, it was reported that the pads of Kamala's feet were thinning due to her active lifestyle and possibly as a result of the damp concrete she walked on. Zookeepers attempted to make boots for her on several occasions, but Kamala removed and occasionally consumed the boots, sometimes with the help of Maharani. Her keepers finally settled on a custom made set of knee-high leather boots. The boots cost $300 and took over 120 hours to make.

In 2004, Kamala's daughter, Maharani, gave birth to Kamala's grandchild, a female elephant. Kamala and Maharani rejected her shortly after birth, and the baby developed an infection. Keepers gave her blood transfusions and antibiotics, but she died shortly thereafter and was posthumously named Keemaya. Maharani had behaved with confusion and aggression towards her first calf, and zookeepers had the idea of breeding Kamala again, to provide her daughter with a role model for motherhood. They unsuccessfully bred Kamala with Maharani's former mate, Spike. Maharani had another calf, Malti, in 2007, but Malti died at the age of 14 months from complications related to elephant endotheliotropic herpesvirus. In 2012, Maharani delivered a premature and stillborn calf.

During the 2013 Alberta floods, many animals at Calgary Zoo were evacuated from their enclosures or moved to higher locations. Due to the size and sturdiness of elephants, zookeepers made the decision to leave them in their pens. They were flooded, but the elephants, including Kamala, were unharmed.

=== Transfer to the National Zoological Park ===
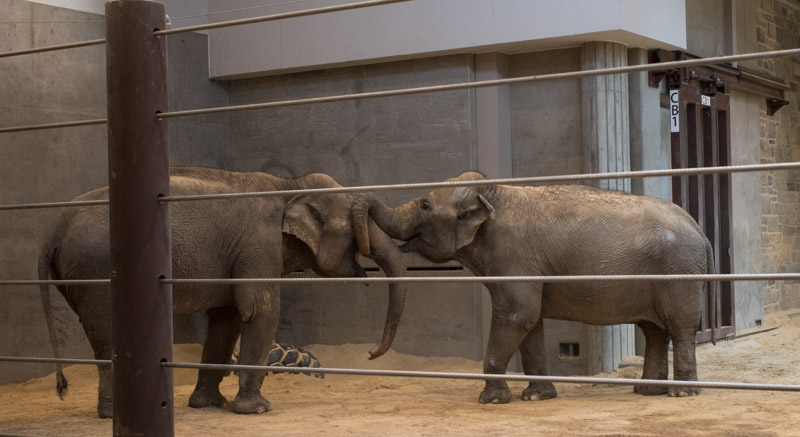
Kamala (right) with daughter, Maharani, in 2020

In 2014, Kamala was moved to the National Zoological Park (NZP) in Washington, D.C., alongside her herd mates Swarna and Maharani. Transferring the female elephants to Washington had been decided upon in August of the previous year, a month after bull Spike was moved to Florida and a year after Calgary Zoo first announced plans to close their elephant exhibit, citing concerns that Calgary's zoo and climate were poorly-suited for the elephants. The trio's transportation was paid for by a US$2 million donation from David Rubenstein. Custom travel crates were built for the occasion, and the 2,400 miles (3,900 km) journey took sixty hours. A keeper from the Calgary Zoo noticed improvements to Kamala's skin soon after she arrived in Washington, which they attributed to the sand and grass in the NZP exhibit. Kamala was initially kept with Maharani and Swarna, but in 2018 she was re-united with Spike upon his transfer at the NZP.

=== Health issues and death ===
Upon her arrival at the NZP, keepers had noticed that Kamala's front legs were knock-kneed and her back legs were bowed. The resulting changes to her gait, and impact on weight distribution likely pre-disposed her to the degenerative osteoarthritis she developed. Keepers began her on a course of treatments including physical therapy, anti-inflammatories, joint supplements, injections of interleukin-1 receptor antagonist protein aimed to slow the disease's progression and pain killers to mitigate symptoms.

In 2024 Kamala's condition declined and her range of motion became so heavily restricted that the NZP felt it was necessary to euthanize her; they did so on November 2. Afterwards, the zoo's other Asian elephants were allowed to spend time alongside her body, with Swarna and Maharani being the last to visit her. Upon hearing of Kamala's death, many internet users claimed that Kamala's death was a "bad omen" for Kamala Harris, the Democratic nominee in the then-upcoming 2024 United States presidential election.

== Description ==
Kamala was described by zookeepers at Calgary as having a "playful" and active personality. According to the NZP, she had "strong bonds" with her keepers and would rumble and squeak with excitement when they approached. They also noted that she was dominant within their herd. Keepers in both zoos remarked on her intelligence and, in 1980, Calgary Zoo estimated she knew 25 commands.

In 1980, five years after her arrival in Canada, Kamala weighed about 900 kg (2,000 lb); she grew to weigh over 3,000 kg (6,600 lb) by 2005 and was the largest of the female elephants at Calgary.

== Paintings ==
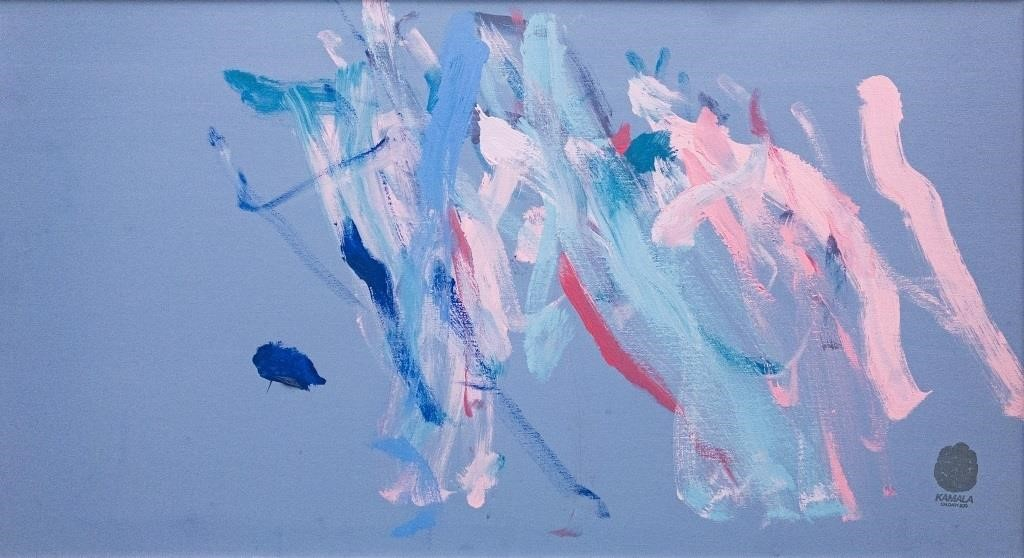
Painting by Kamala

During her time in Canada, Kamala became internationally known for her paintings. She was one of Calgary Zoo's most famous animals was featured in episodes of 60 Minutes and PrimeTime Live. A zookeeper first had the idea to give the elephants access to paint after seeing Kamala making "glorified trunk painting using mud". Initially, all three elephants were offered paints as part of the environmental enrichment program, but Kamala was the only one to take to it. She first used only watercolours and her trunk but within two years was using custom brushes and a variety of colours of acrylic paint to create hundreds of original paintings. She made about one to three paintings per week, and individual paintings typically took her up to twenty minutes.

Prints of Kamala's art were sold in the zoo's gift shop and the proceeds used to support the zoo's environmental research and elephant exhibit. Customers were allowed to see videos of Kamala painting, and zoo patrons were sometimes allowed to watch her paint. The originals were sold and auctioned by the zoo at prices typically ranging from CA$400 to CA$5000; the paintings were often purchased by art collectors.

In 2005, after a tsunami hit Sri Lanka, the Calgary Zoo auctioned one of Kamala's paintings on eBay to raise money for the Red Cross's tsunami relief fund. It sold for CA$6,350. Thirty-seven bids were placed for the painting, which was blue and green and took Kamala half an hour to make. The fundraiser itself was inspired by a similar fundraiser by the Fort Worth Zoo, which auctioned off a painting by one of their elephants, Rasha, to raise money for the Red Cross.

According to her keepers at Calgary Zoo, Kamala appeared to be "quite aware and particularly proud of her artistic endeavours". In 1994 her favourite colour was purple, though zookeepers reported that she got "into phases" such as the "blue phase" she experienced in the mid-2000s.

== See also ==
- List of individual elephants
- Ruby (elephant), an elephant from Phoenix Zoo known for her paintings
- Moo Deng, a pygmy hippopotamus who also received media attention in the 2024 US presidential election
