= Sri Lankan Veterinarians Strike for Better Treatment of Elephants, 2010 =

The Sri Lankan veterinarians strike for the better treatment of elephants began in August 2010 when veterinarians in Sri Lanka joined to protest for safety and preservation of elephants in their country. The veterinarians went on strike to help the endangered and wounded elephants whose land was taken over by the people of Sri Lanka and no longer had the open space or proper resources to roam and live healthy lives. The veterinarians demanded that the government give them the proper working conditions they needed in order to help the elephants as efficiently as possible.

Since 1990, the number of elephants in Sri Lanka dropped from nearly 12,000 to only 4,000 in 2010. This happened because the Sri Lankan government allowed the land which was designated for these elephants to become occupied by humans. In 2009, there were 50 human deaths and 228 deaths of the Sri Lankan elephants. These elephants were pushed into small confined parts of the land in order to make room for the humans, allowing them to build houses and farms because of the increase in their population. By the humans taking over the elephant's land, they created a shortage of food for the elephants and they were not getting enough of what they needed to survive. The veterinarians whose funding for the wildlife veterinary program had been cut, took away the workers and services that helped the elephants. The veterinarians wanted the proper space needed for these elephants to live peacefully and, in 2010, they presented a new elephant conservation plan to address the conflict between the villagers and the elephants. The government turned it down and therefore the workers resorted to going on strike.

== Strike ==
The strike began on 15 August 2010. Between 16 and 21 August, eleven national wildlife veterinarians went on strike, during this week they refused to work for or serve the government, but continued to help injured elephants and presented their demands. They demanded better working conditions and for the government to fill the eight other positions they had left vacant. They wanted new nature reserves and for the elephants to be resettled into them. They also wanted to meet with the minister in charge of wildlife to discuss the new elephant conservation plan. The veterinarians were able to meet with the Deputy Economic Development Minister, but this did not do much for their demands. Thus far there is no documentation suggesting their demands were met and their solutions to the problems have still not been acted upon.
