= Udawalawe Elephant Transit Home =

Elephant rehabilitation facility in Sri Lanka

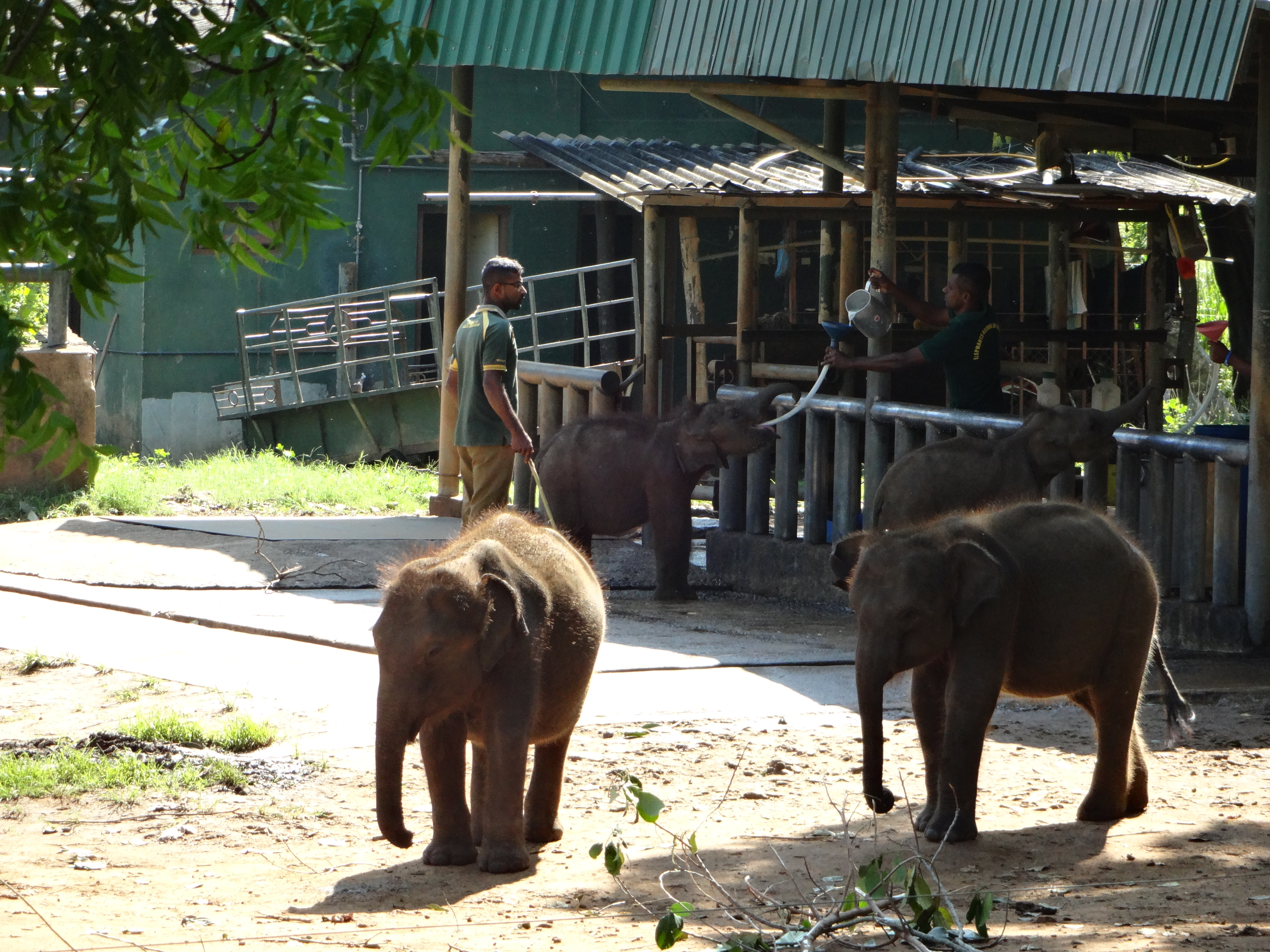
- Juvenile elephants at Udawalawe Elephant Transit Home

- Location within Sri Lanka
- Location: Sabaragamuwa Province, Sri Lanka
- Nearest city: Embilipitiya
- Coordinates: 6°28′00″N 80°53′00″E
- Established: 1995
- Governing body: Department of Wildlife Conservation

The Udawalawe Elephant Transist Home (Sinhala: උඩවලව ඇත් අතුරු සෙවණ, romanized: Udawalawa Ath Athuru Sewana) is a wildlife protection facility within Udawalawe National Park in Sri Lanka that was established in 1995 by the Sri Lanka Department of Wildlife Conservation in Sri Lanka.

== History ==
Sri Lankan elephants (Elephas maximus maximus) are an endangered species. The Elephant Transit Home within Udawalawe National Park was established by the Department of Wildlife Conservation. The facility was established under the 29th Amendment to the Fauna and Flora Protection Ordinance Part II.

== Facilities and care ==
Up to three elephants per week are killed in Sri Lanka due to conflicts with humans, often leaving behind orphan calves. The elephants are kept at part of the Udawalawe National Park to maintain familiarity with their habitat.

The center houses information on elephants. Additionally, a solar heater was set up at the facility by Dilmah Conservation to heat the water used to make the milk fed to the orphaned elephants.

== See also ==
- Pinnawela Elephant Orphanage
- Wildlife of Sri Lanka
