= Pinnawala Elephant Orphanage =

Elephant orphanage in Sri Lanka

Pinnawala Elephant Orphanage පින්නවල අලි අනාථාගාරය
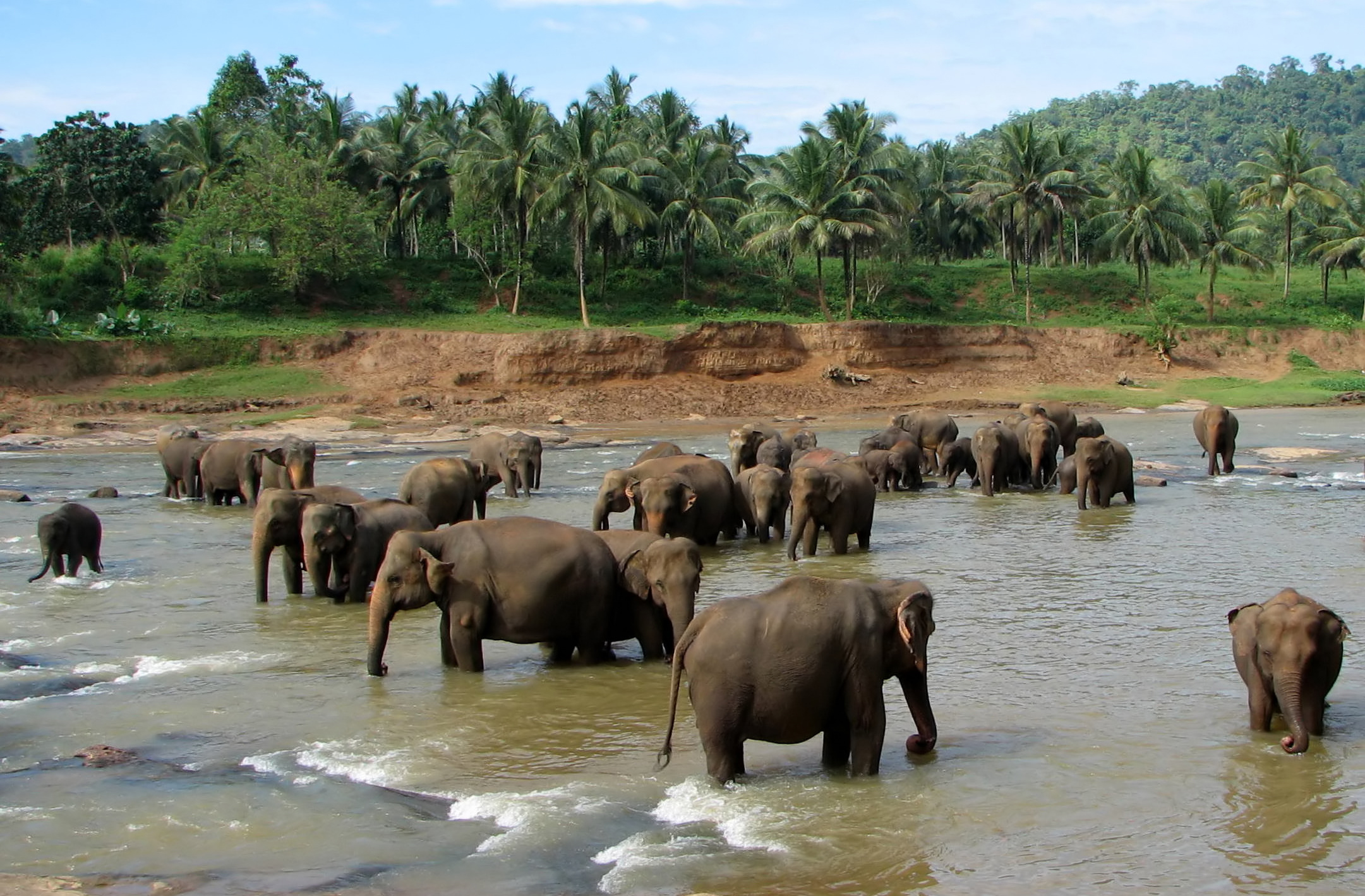
- Herd of elephants at Pinnawala
- Interactive map of Pinnawala Elephant Orphanage පින්නවල අලි අනාථාගාරය
- 7°18′2″N 80°23′18″E
- Date opened: 1975
- Location: Pinnawala, Kegalle, Sabaragamuwa, Sri Lanka
- Land area: 25 acres (10 ha)
- No. of animals: 71 (2023)
- No. of species: 1
- Website: https://nationalzoo.gov.lk/elephantorphanage/

Pinnawala Elephant Orphanage (Sinhala: පින්නවල අලි අනාථාගාරය), is a captive breeding and conservation institute for wild Asian elephants located at Pinnawala village, 13 km (8.1 mi) northeast of Kegalle town in Sabaragamuwa Province of Sri Lanka. Pinnawala has the largest herd of captive elephants in the world. In 2023, there were 71 elephants, including 30 males and 41 females from 3 generations, living in Pinnawala.

The orphanage was founded to care and protect the many orphaned unweaned wild elephants found wandering in and near the forests of Sri Lanka. It was established in 1975 by the Sri Lanka Department of Wildlife Conservation (DWC).

On 31 August 2021, a 25 year old elephant named Surangi gave birth to twin male baby elephants at the orphanage. It also marked the first instance of the birth of twin elephants in Sri Lanka after a gap of 80 years since 1941.

== History ==
Elephants walking to the Maha Oya River

The Pinnawala Elephant Orphanage was established by the Sri Lankan Department of Wildlife Conservation in 1975 for feeding and providing care and sanctuary to orphaned baby elephants that were found in the wild. The orphanage was located at the Wilpattu National Park, then shifted to the tourist complex at Bentota and then to the Dehiwala Zoo. From the Zoo it was shifted to Pinnawala village on a 25-acre (10 ha) coconut plantation adjacent to the Maha Oya River. The land was donated to the Government of Sri Lanka by the Adhikaram Mudiyanse Family (Pinnawala Family) of Kandy.

The primary residential care area is on the east side of Highway B199, Rambukkana Road. The main site also has some restaurants and refreshment stands, and management buildings including sleeping sheds and veterinary facilities. The elephant bathing and viewing area along the Oya River is directly opposite on the west side of the highway.

At the time it was settled, the orphanage had five baby elephants which formed its nucleus. The addition of orphans continued till 1995 when the Elephant Transit Home (ETH) adjoining Udawalawe National Park was created by the DWC. Since then, orphaned babies have been taken to the ETH and addition to the Pinnawala herd has been mostly through births occurring there.

It was planned for the facility to attract local and foreign visitors, the income from which would help to maintain the orphanage. The Pinnawala Orphanage has since become a tourist attraction. In 1978, the orphanage was taken over by the Department of National Zoological Gardens Sri Lanka. In 1982 an elephant breeding program was launched.

Visitors to the park can view the care and daily routine of the elephants, such as bottle-feeding of elephant calves, feeding of all other elephants, and bathing in the Ma Oya (River).

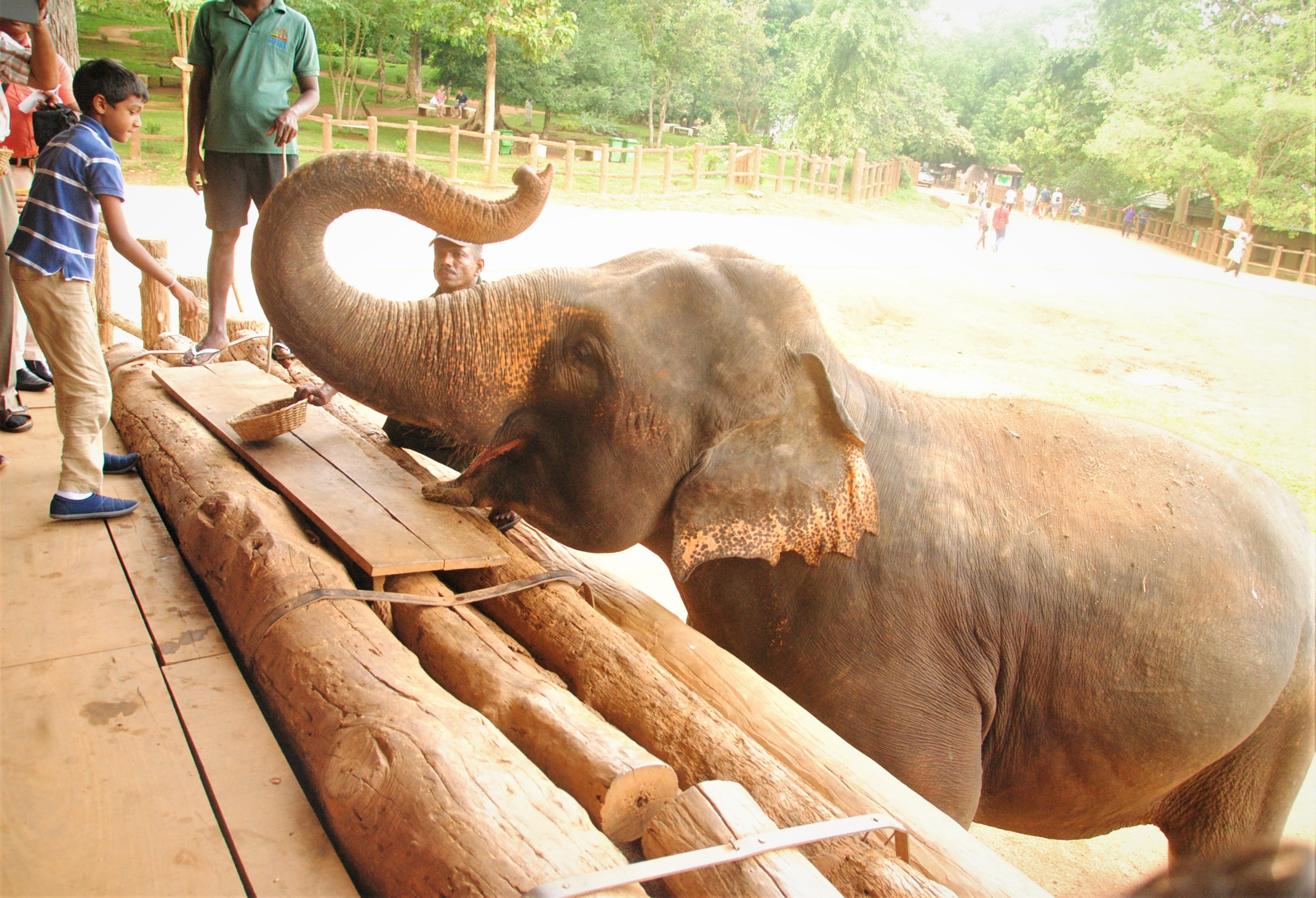
Visitors are allowed to feed Elephants at Pinnawela, Sri Lanka.

== Elephant care ==
Young elephants sometimes fall into pits and ravines in their quest for water during drought periods. Other orphans have been displaced from their wild habitat by development projects or have been found abandoned before weaning, diseased or wounded.

There are around 70 mahouts (handlers) who take care of the elephants. The female and young elephants in Pinnawala range freely as a herd during the day in an area of a few acres. They are herded about 0.5 km (0.31 mi) twice a day to drink and be bathed in the river. At night, the females are individually chained in stalls. Adult males do some light work such as transporting feed. They are chained and managed individually. Calves born in Pinnawala are not bottle-fed, but a few from ETH are kept at Pinnawala and bottle fed as a tourist attraction.

The elephants are fed in their stalls. There is very little food they can gather from the premises of the orphanage except some grass. Large quantities of jackfruit, coconut, kitul (sugar palm), tamarind and grass, brought in daily, form the bulk of the elephants food. Each adult animal is given around 250 kilograms (550 lb) of this green matter per day and around 2 kg (4.4 lb) from a food bag containing rice bran and maize.

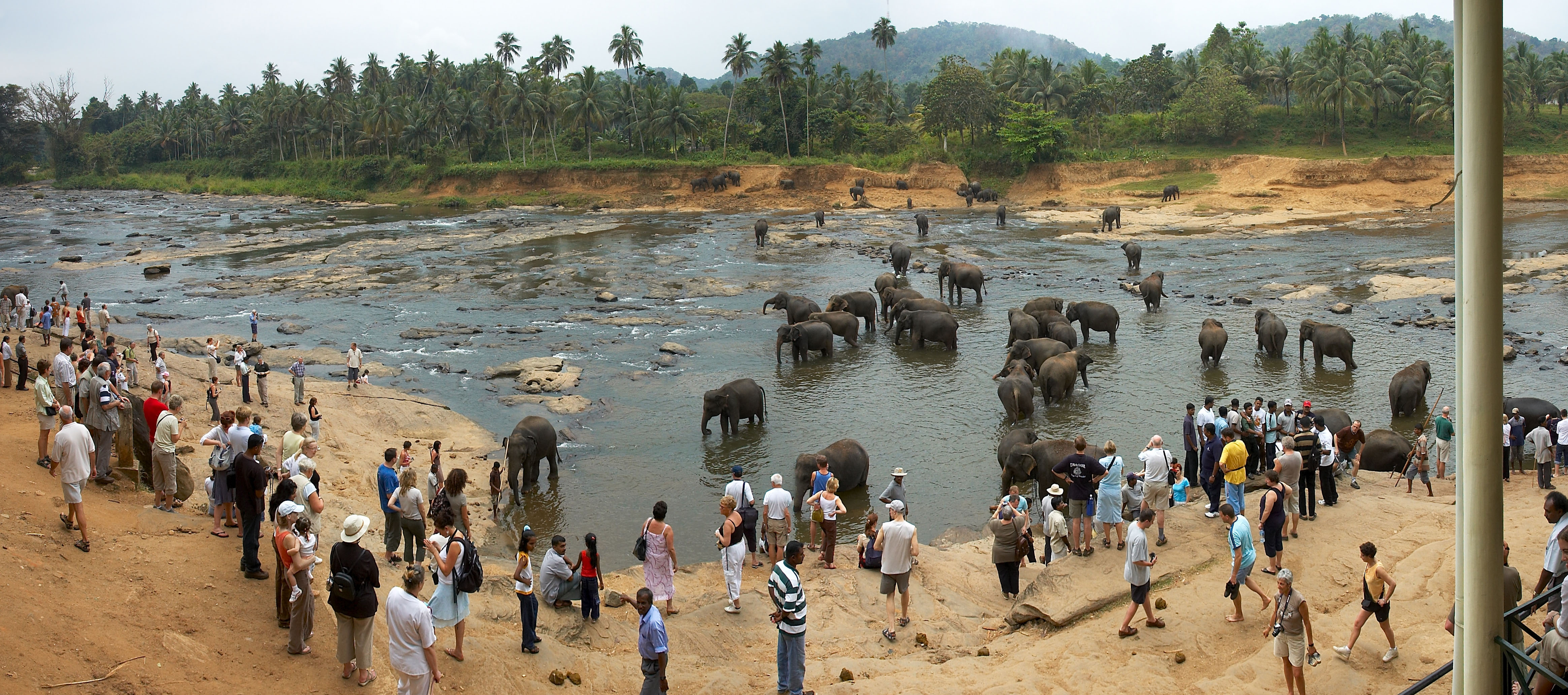
Tourists observing elephants bathing in Oya River

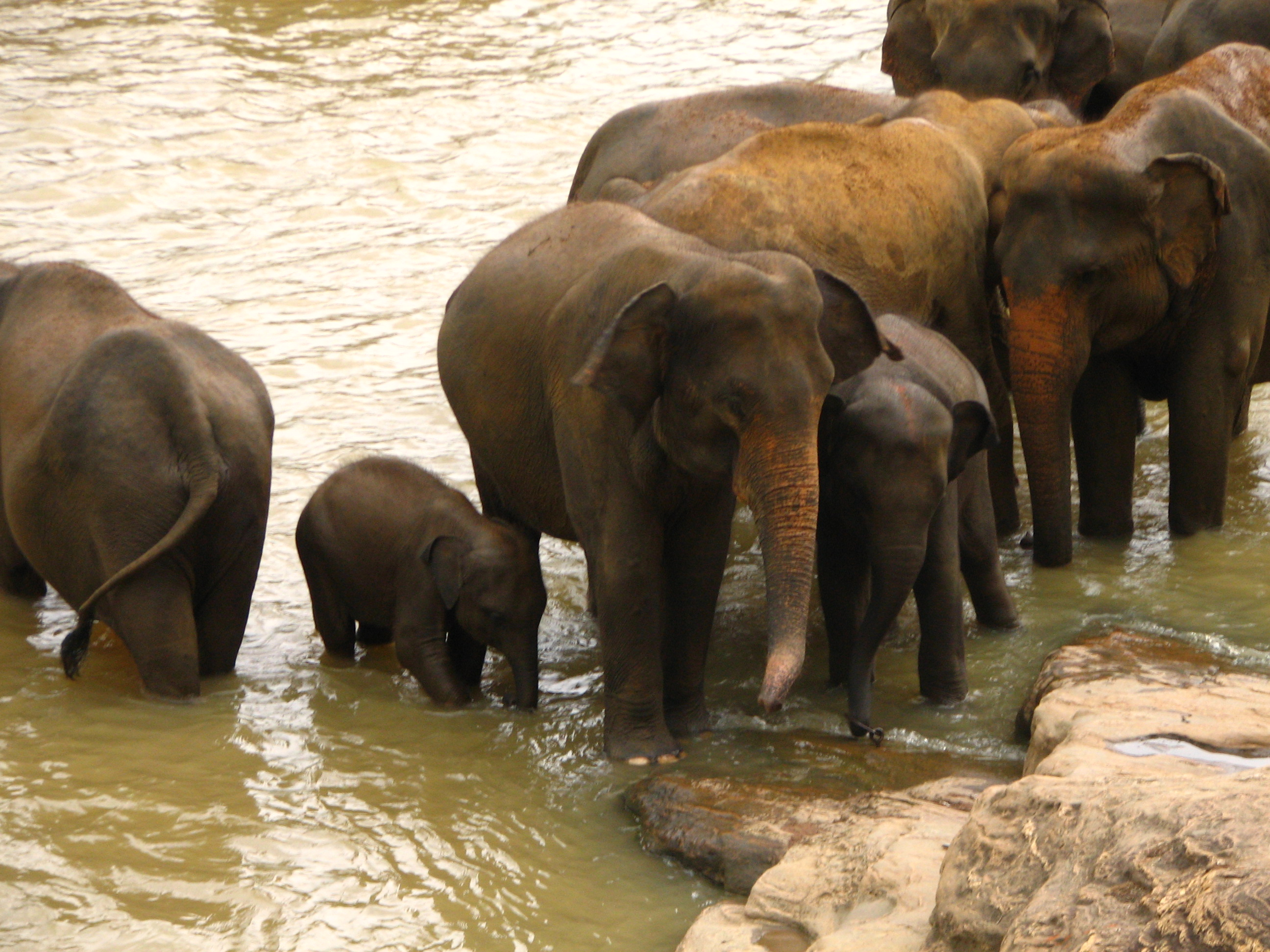
Baby elephants with their mothers at Pinnawala

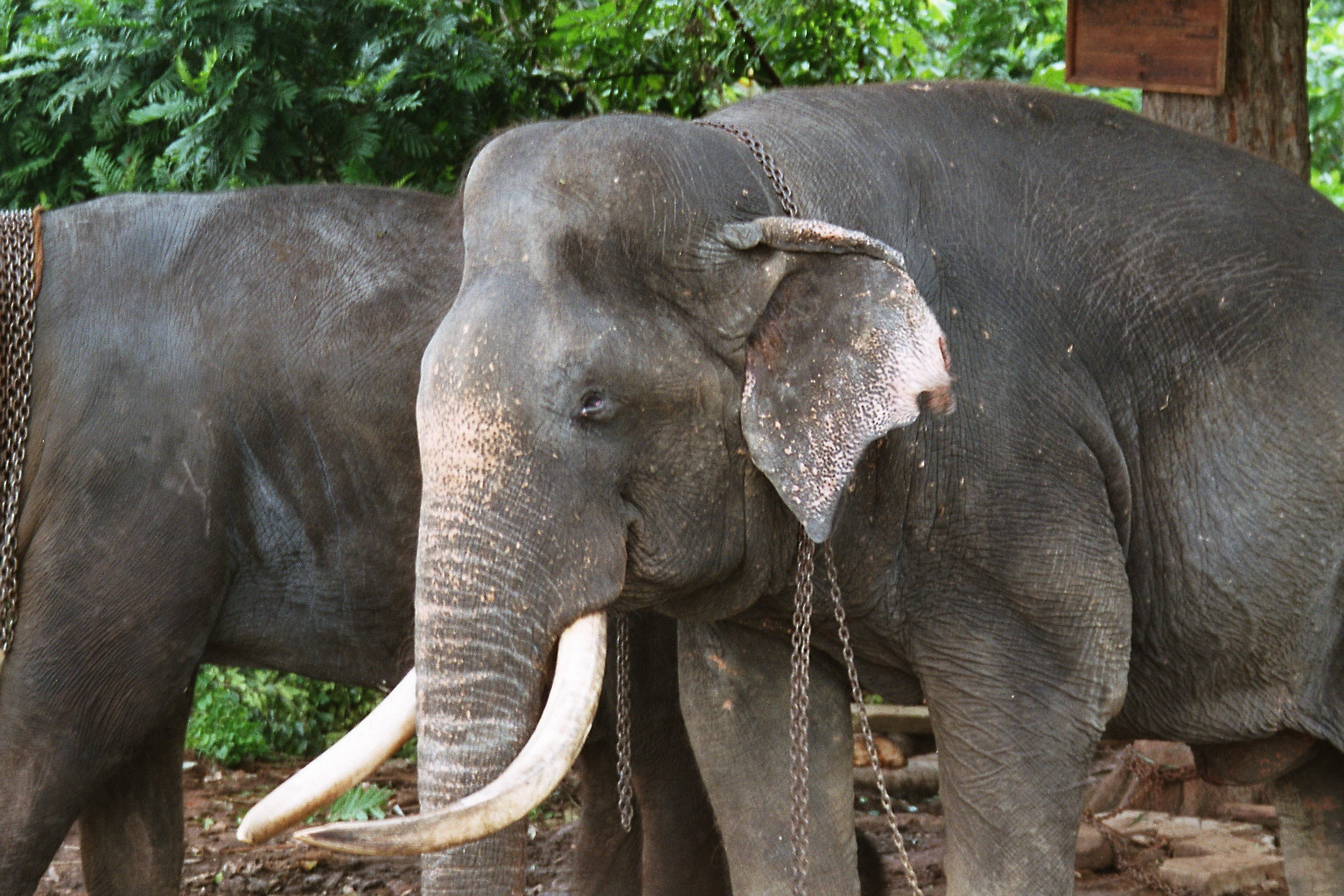
Blind tusker "RAJA" at Pinnawala

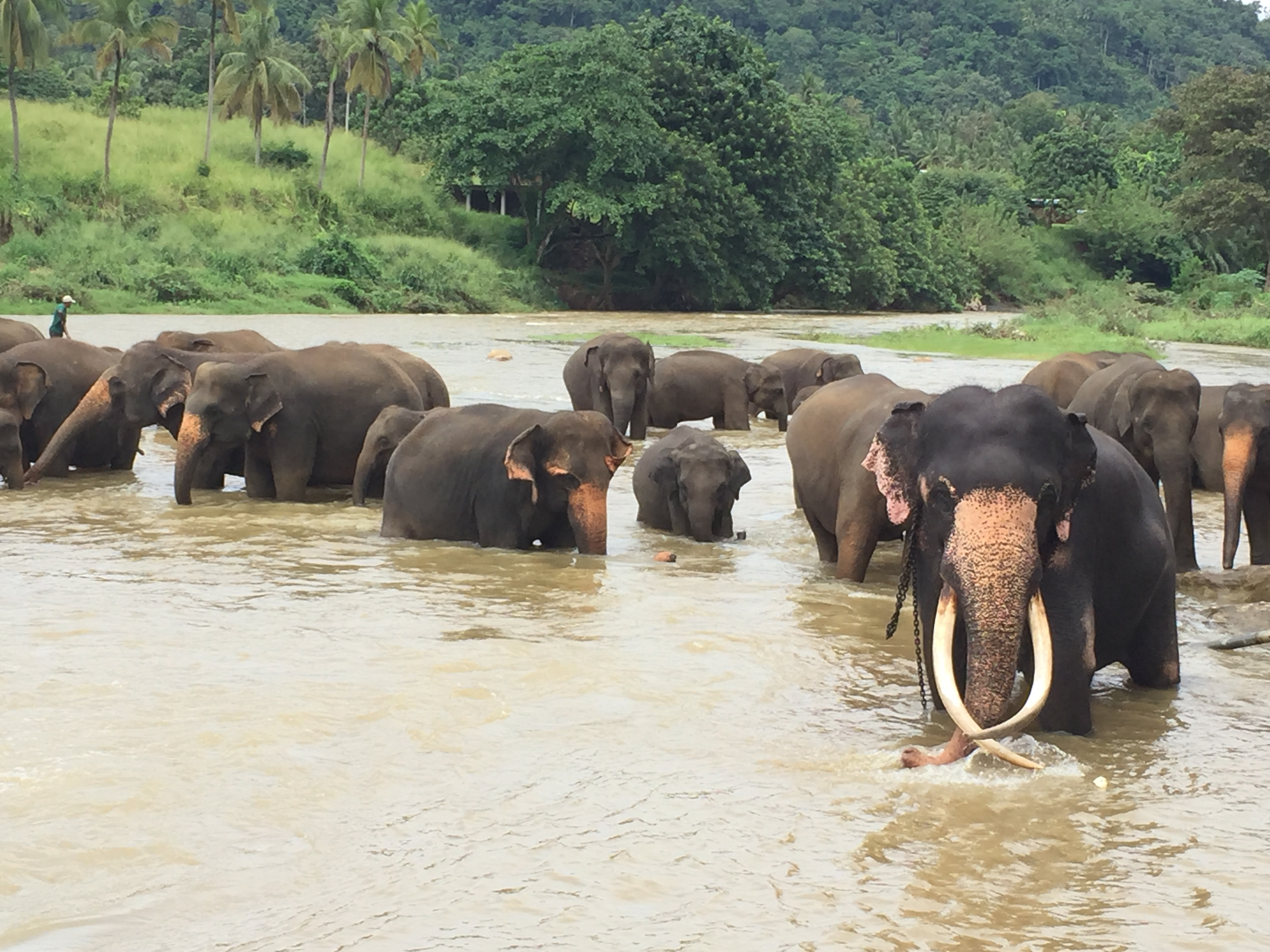
Elephants bathing at Pinnawala

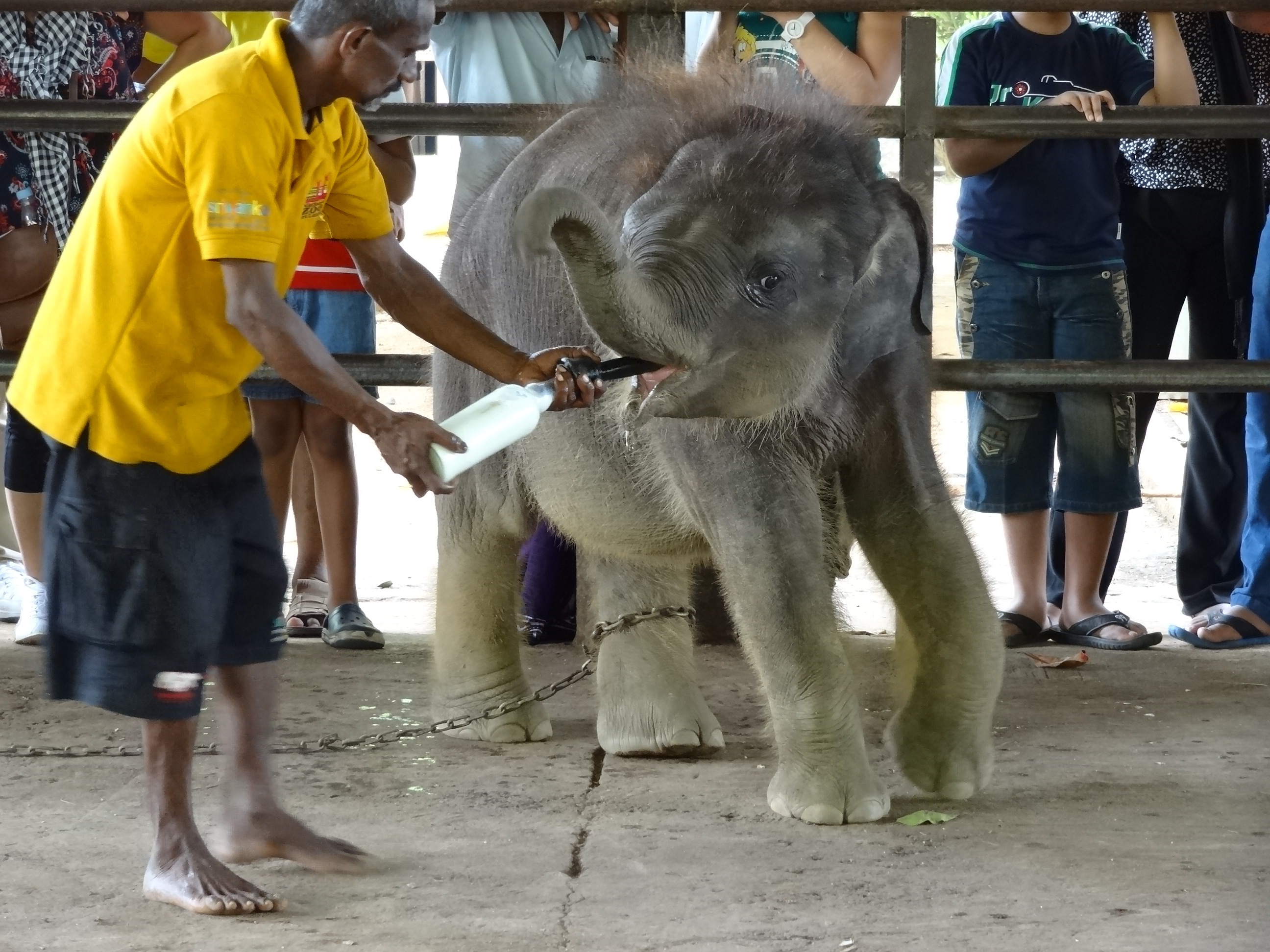
A baby elephant at Pinnawala

== Elephant breeding ==
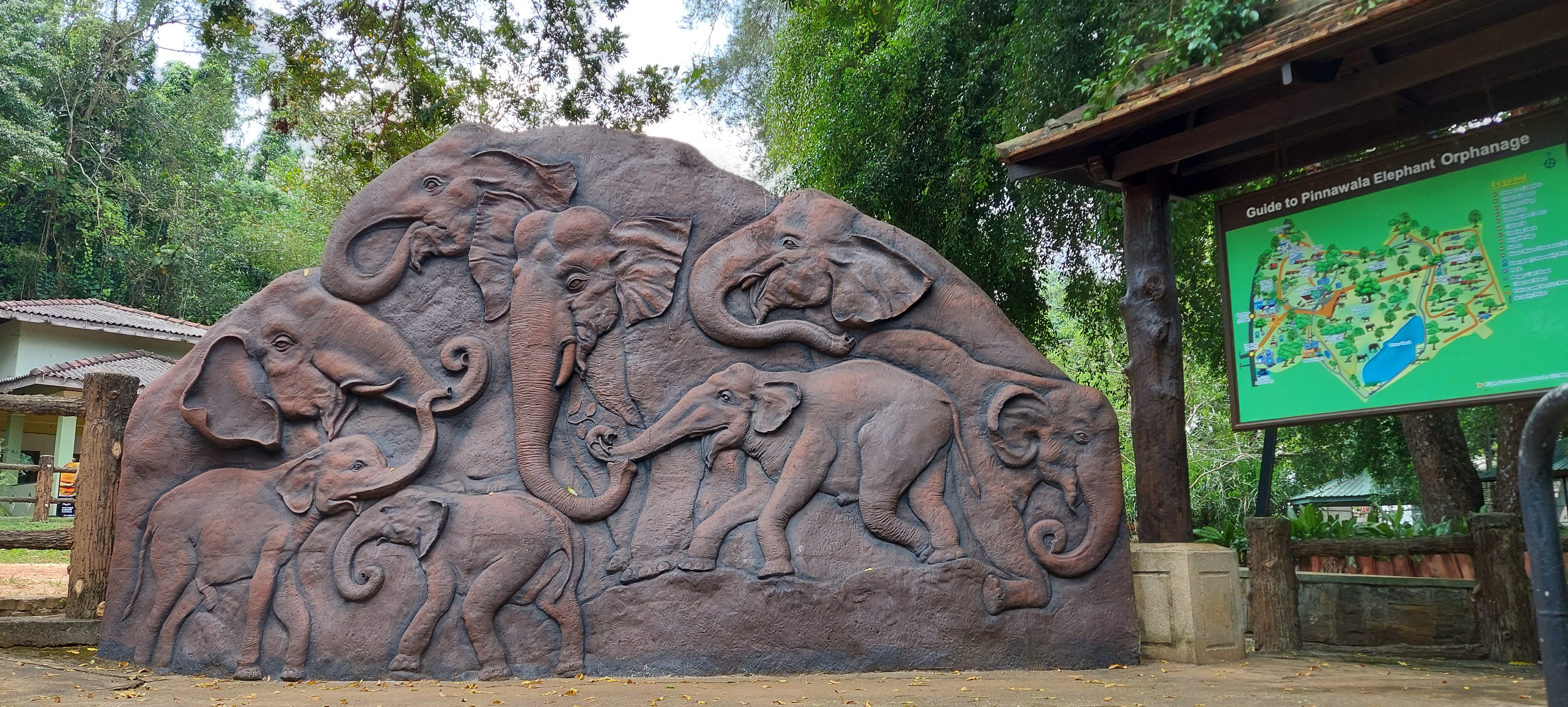
Plaque at the entrance

Pinnawala Elephant Orphanage conducts captive breeding of some elephants in its care. The natural environment and healthy care and feeding at Pinnawala made the elephant breeding program a success. The first birth at Pinnawala was in 1984, Sukumalee, a female was born to Vijaya and Kumari. There have been many successful births at the facility, with 75 captive births so far (2023). The highest number of births in a single year was recorded in 2011, with 17 births.

== Animal welfare ==
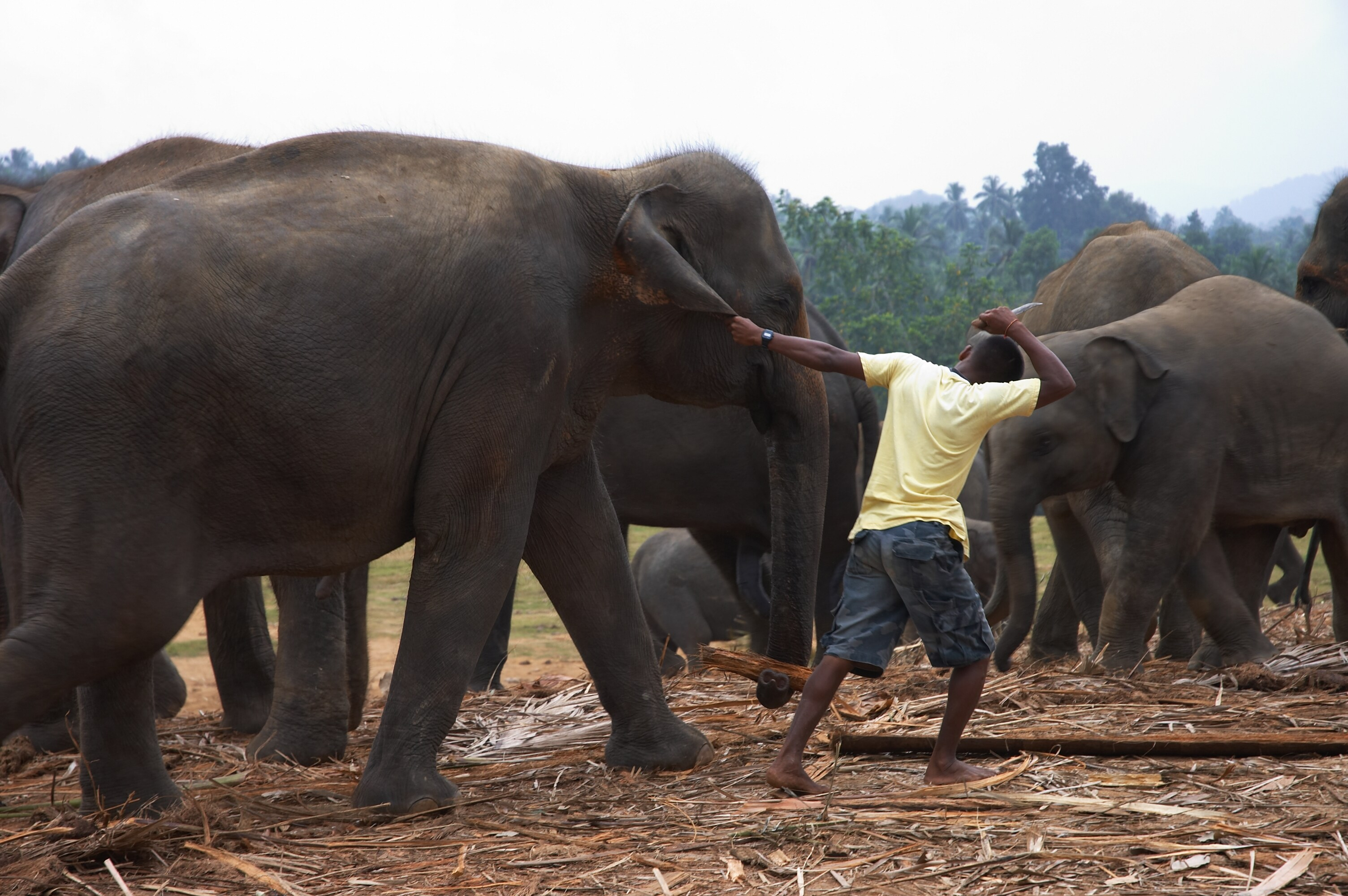
Pulling an elephant to a desired place is a heavy job...

Most of the elephants at Pinnawala Elephant Orphanage healthy and once attaining adulthood, will be retained within the facility mostly since they have become dependent on supplied food. A few disabled elephants are given residential care.

One tusker, Raja, who died in 2013, was blind, and one female, named Sama, lost her front right leg to a land mine.

Pinnawala Elephant Orphanage was the subject of a 2010 report by the Born Free Foundation which called into question animal welfare at the orphanage.

The quality of care of elephants who are donated from Pinnawala has been a big public issue. In 2012 The Sri Lanka Environment Trust spoke out against authorities who continue to 'donate' tamed elephants to people who had 'poor' past records of taking care of animals. "There are enough cases to show that the authorities are releasing elephants from Pinnawala to the same group of people who don't take care of the animals." Despite these accusations it is proven that the surveillance is done by the fact that four of such donated elephants by presidential decree being returned to the elephant by a court order.

== See also ==
- David Sheldrick Wildlife Trust, that has worked with orphan elephants in East Africa since 1977
- Dehiwala Zoo
- Sri Lankan elephant
- Udawalawe Elephant Transit Home
