= Pinnawala =

Pinnawala පින්නවල
- Town
- Location within Sri Lanka
- Coordinates: 7.3015°N 80.3867°E
- Country: Sri Lanka
- Province: Sabaragamuwa Province
- District: Kegalle
- Time zone: UTC+5:30 (Sri Lanka Standard Time)
- Sri Lanka Post: 70130
- Area code: 035

Pinnawala is a village in Kegalle District of Sri Lanka and is around 90 km from the capital, Colombo. It is well known for its elephant orphanage.

== Elephant Orphanage ==
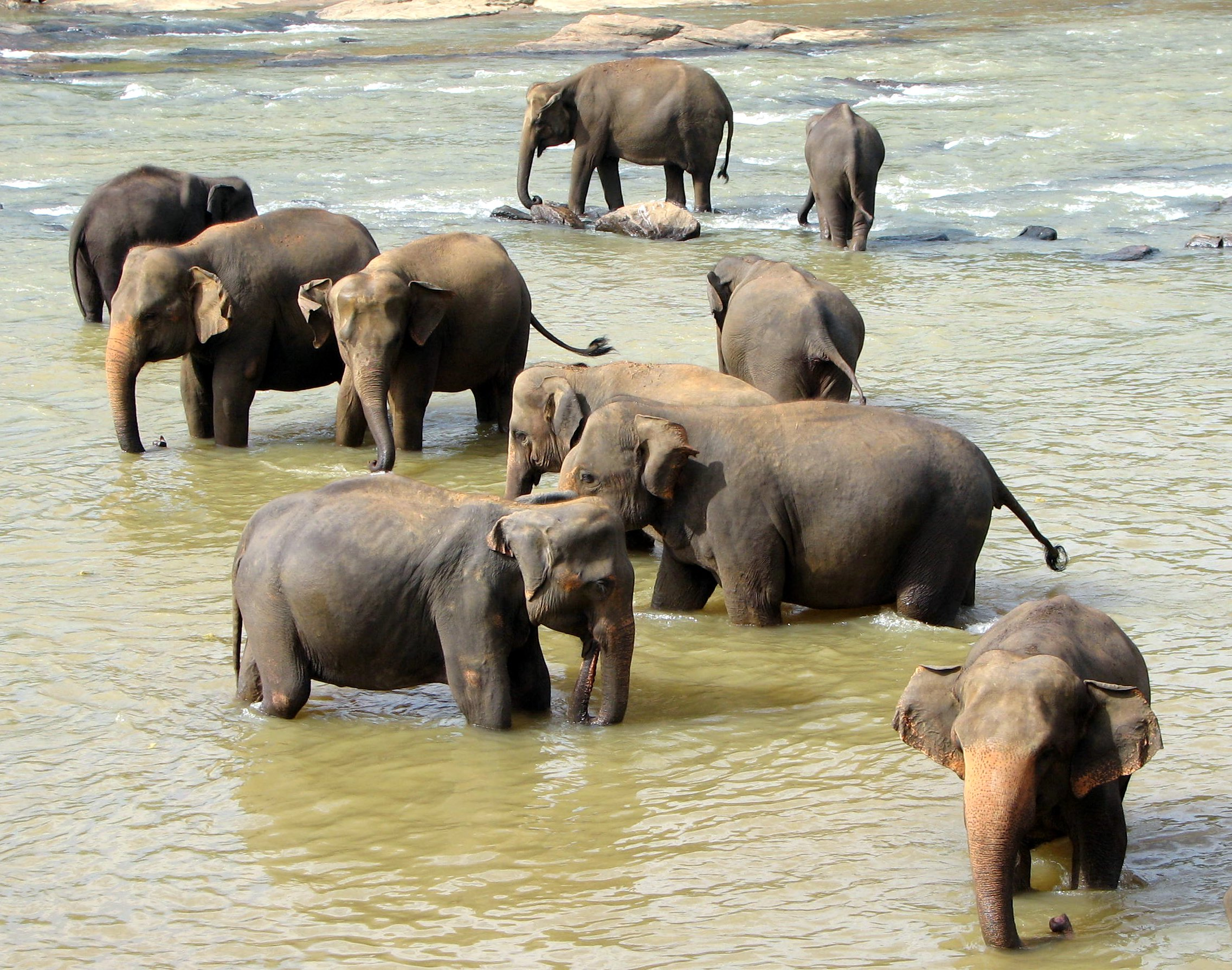
Elephants bathing at Pinnawala Elephant Orphanage

The Pinnawela Elephant Orphanage is situated northwest of the town of Kegalle, halfway between the present commercial capital Colombo and the ancient royal residence Kandy. There are about 84 elephants under protection. The orphanage is open to the public.
