= Udawalawe National Park =

National park in Sri Lanka

- IUCN category II (national park)
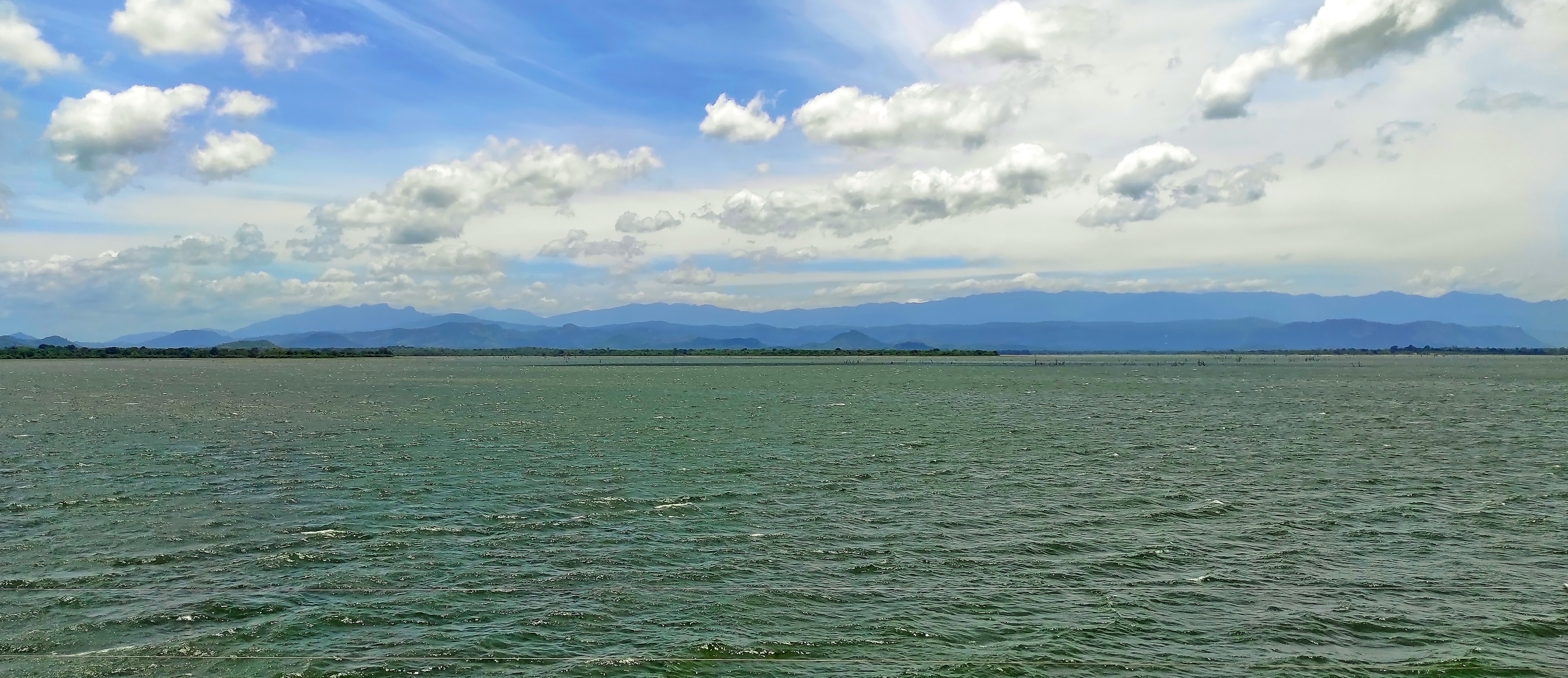
- Udawalawa Reservoir in Udawalawe National Park

- Location within Sri Lanka
- Location: Uva, and Sabaragamuwa Provinces, Sri Lanka
- Nearest city: Embilipitiya
- Coordinates: 6°26′18″N 80°53′18″E
- Area: 308.21 km^{2} (119.00 sq mi)
- Established: June 30, 1972
- Visitors: 452,000 (in 1994–2001)
- Governing body: Department of Wildlife Conservation

Udawalawe National Park is a national park on the boundary of Uva and Sabaragamuwa Provinces in Sri Lanka. The park was created to provide a sanctuary for wild animals displaced by the construction of the Udawalawe Reservoir on the Walawe River, as well as to protect the catchment of the reservoir. The reserve covers 30,821 hectares (119.00 mi^{2}) of land area and was established on 30 June 1972.

Before the designation of the national park, the area was used for shifting cultivation (chena farming). The farmers were gradually removed once the national park was declared. The park is 165 kilometres (103 mi) from Colombo. Udawalawe is an important habitat for water birds and Sri Lankan elephants. It is a popular tourist destination and the third-most visited park in the country.

== Physical features ==
Udawalawe lies on the boundary of Sri Lanka's wet and dry zones. Plains dominate the topography, though there are also some mountainous areas. The Kalthota Range and Diyawini Falls are in the north of the park and the outcrops of Bambaragala and Reminikotha lie within it. The park has an annual rainfall of 1,500 millimetres (59 in), most of which falls during the months of October to January and March to May. The average annual temperature is about 27–28 °C (81–82 °F), while relative humidity varies from 70% to 83%. Well-drained reddish-brown soil is the predominant soil type, with poorly drained low humic grey soils found in the valley bottoms. Mainly alluvial soils form the beds of water courses

== Ecology ==
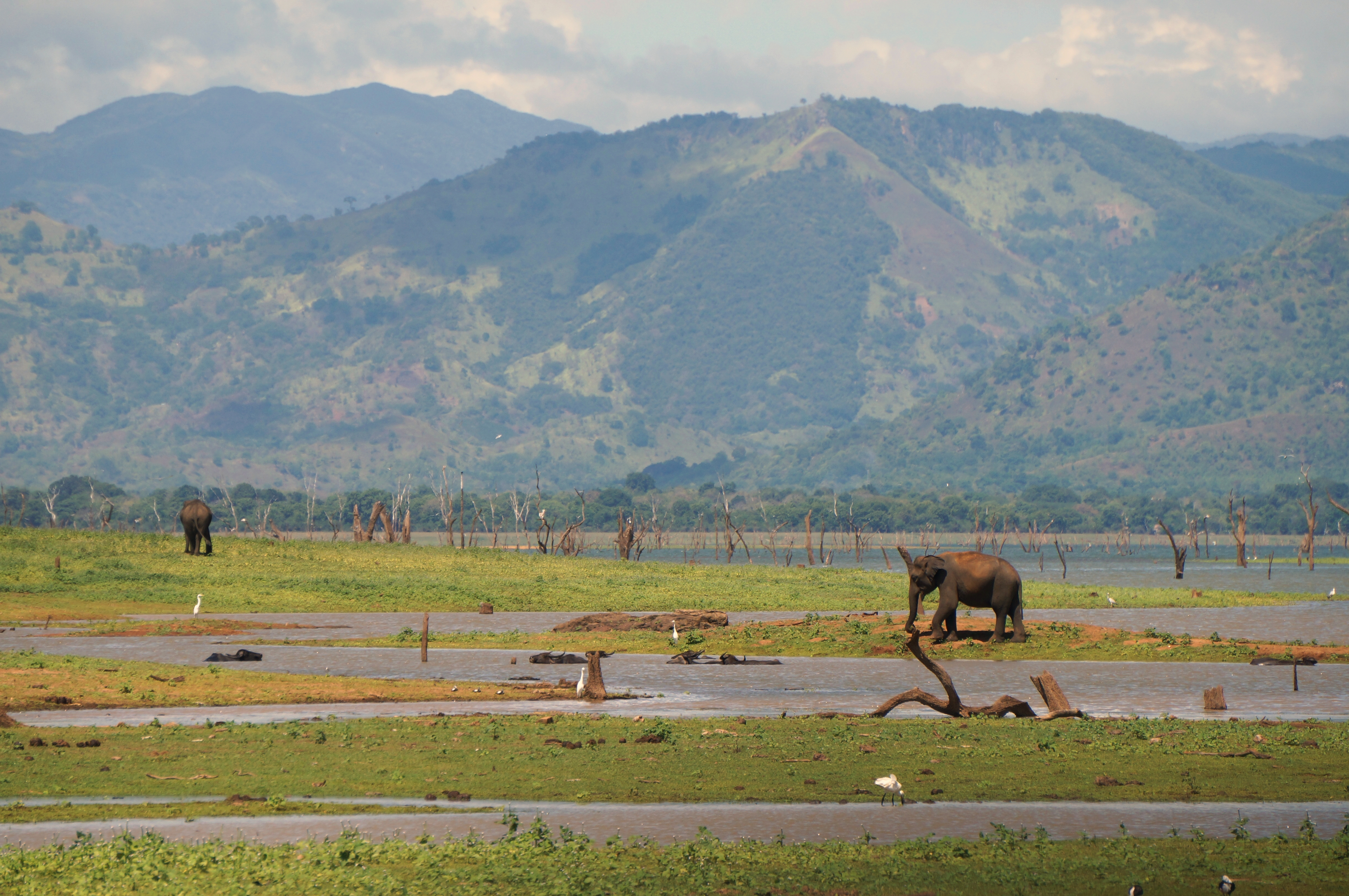
Udawalawe National Park

The habitat surrounding at the reservoir includes marshes, the Walawe river and its tributaries, forests and grasslands. Dead trees standing in the reservoir are visual reminders of the extent of forest cover before the construction of the Udawalawe Dam. Green algae, including Pediastrum and Scenedesmus spp., and blue green algae species such as Microsystis, occur in the reservoir. Areas of open grassland are abundant as a result of former chena farming practices. There is a plantation of teak beyond the southern boundary, below the dam, which was planted before the declaration of the park. Species recorded from the park include 94 plants, 21 fish, 12 amphibians, 33 reptiles, 184 birds (33 of which are migratory), and 43 mammals. Additionally 135 species of butterflies are among the invertebrates found in Udawalawe.

== Flora ==
Hopea cordifolia, Memecylon petiolatum, Erythroxylon zeylanicum, and Jasminum angustifolium are endemic floral species recorded from the park. Hopea cordifolia is found along the river along with Terminalia arjuna. Panicum maximum and Imperata cylindrica are important food sources for the elephants. Chloroxylon swietenia, Berrya cordifolia, Diospyros ebenum, Adina cordifolia, Vitex pinnata, Schleichera oleosa, and Diospyros ovalifolia are the common taller trees. Terminalia bellirica and Phyllanthus emblica are plants of medicinal value found in the forest. Cymbopogon confertiflorus grass species and Grewia tiliifolia bushes are common in the grasslands.

== Fauna ==
=== Mammals ===
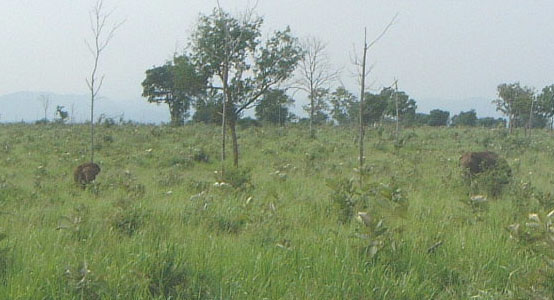
The park is capable of sustaining a large herd of Sri Lankan elephants

Udawalawe is an important habitat for Sri Lankan elephants, which are relatively hard to see in its open habitats. Many elephants are attracted to the park because of the Udawalawe reservoir, with a herd of about 250 believed to be permanently resident. The Udawalawe Elephant Transit Home was established in 1995 for the purpose of looking after abandoned elephant calves within the park. A total of nine calves, on two occasions in 1998 and 2000, with another eight calves in 2002, were released in the park when old enough to fend for themselves.

The rusty-spotted cat, fishing cat and Sri Lankan leopard are members of the family Felidae present in Udawalawe. The Sri Lankan sloth bear is seldom seen because of its rarity. Sri Lankan sambar deer, Sri Lankan axis deer, Indian muntjac, Sri Lankan spotted chevrotain, wild boar and water buffalo are among other mammal species. Golden jackal, Asian palm civet, toque macaque, tufted grey langur and Indian hare also inhabit the park. A study conducted in 1989 found that considerable numbers of golden palm civets inhabit the forests of Udawalawe. Five species of mice also have been recorded from the park. The endemic Ceylon spiny mouse, known from Yala National Park, was recorded in Udawalawe in 1989. Indian bush rat and three species of mongoose are also recorded in the national park.

=== Birds ===
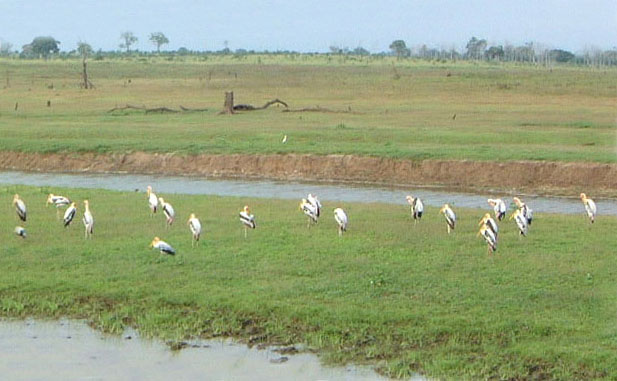
Painted storks are among the many water birds that migrate to the park

Udawalawe is also a good birdwatching site. Endemics such as Sri Lanka spurfowl, red-faced malkoha, Sri Lanka grey hornbill, brown-capped babbler, and Sri Lanka junglefowl are among of the breeding resident birds. White wagtail and black-capped kingfisher are rare migrants. A variety of water birds visit the reservoir, including cormorants, the spot-billed pelican, Asian openbill, painted stork, black-headed ibis and Eurasian spoonbill.

The open parkland attracts birds of prey such as white-bellied sea eagle, crested serpent-eagle, grey-headed fish eagle, booted eagle, and changeable hawk-eagle. Landbirds are in abundance, and include Indian roller, Indian peafowl, Malabar pied hornbill and pied cuckoo.

=== Reptiles and fish ===
Oriental garden lizards, painted-lip lizards, mugger crocodiles, Asian water monitors, Bengal monitors and 30 species of snake are found in the park. Garra ceylonensis is an endemic fish species recorded in park. Introduced Oreochromis spp., giant gourami, catla, and rohu are important food fish species found in the reservoir.

== Conservation ==
Clearing natural forests and planting monospecies cultures such as pine and eucalyptus are causing reduced water levels in the Walawe river. Encroachment by human settlements, poaching, illegal logging, gem mining, overgrazing and chena farming are major threats to the park. Lantana camara and Phyllanthus polyphyllus are invasive weeds affecting the food plants of the elephants. Occasions of elephants being shot with illegal muzzleloader guns has been reported.

== Tourism ==
In the six months ending in August 2009, the park earned revenue of Rs. 18.2 million. From 1994 to 2001 some 423,000 people visited the park, 20% of them foreigners. And in last 2023 Udawalawa National Park attracted an impressive 188,388 visitor. For the 1998–2001 period average annual revenue was US$280,000. Postage stamps bearing the images of four wild animals of Udawalawe were issued on 31 October 2007 in the series "National Parks of Sri Lanka", featuring water buffalo, Sri Lankan elephant, ruddy mongoose and tufted grey langur.

== Safari ==
Udawalawe National Park is widely known for its jeep safari experiences, which provide opportunities to observe wildlife in open grassland and scrub forest habitats. The park’s relatively sparse vegetation allows consistent sightings of large mammals, particularly the Sri Lankan elephant, which is considered one of the main attractions for visitors.

Safari drives are typically conducted during the early morning and late afternoon hours, when animal activity is generally higher. In addition to elephants, visitors commonly encounter water buffalo, sambar deer, spotted deer, crocodiles and a variety of bird species. The park’s accessibility and reliable wildlife sightings have contributed to its reputation as one of Sri Lanka’s prominent safari destinations.

== See also ==
- Protected areas of Sri Lanka
- Udawalawe Elephant Transit Home
