= Udawalawe Dam =

Uda Walawe Dam
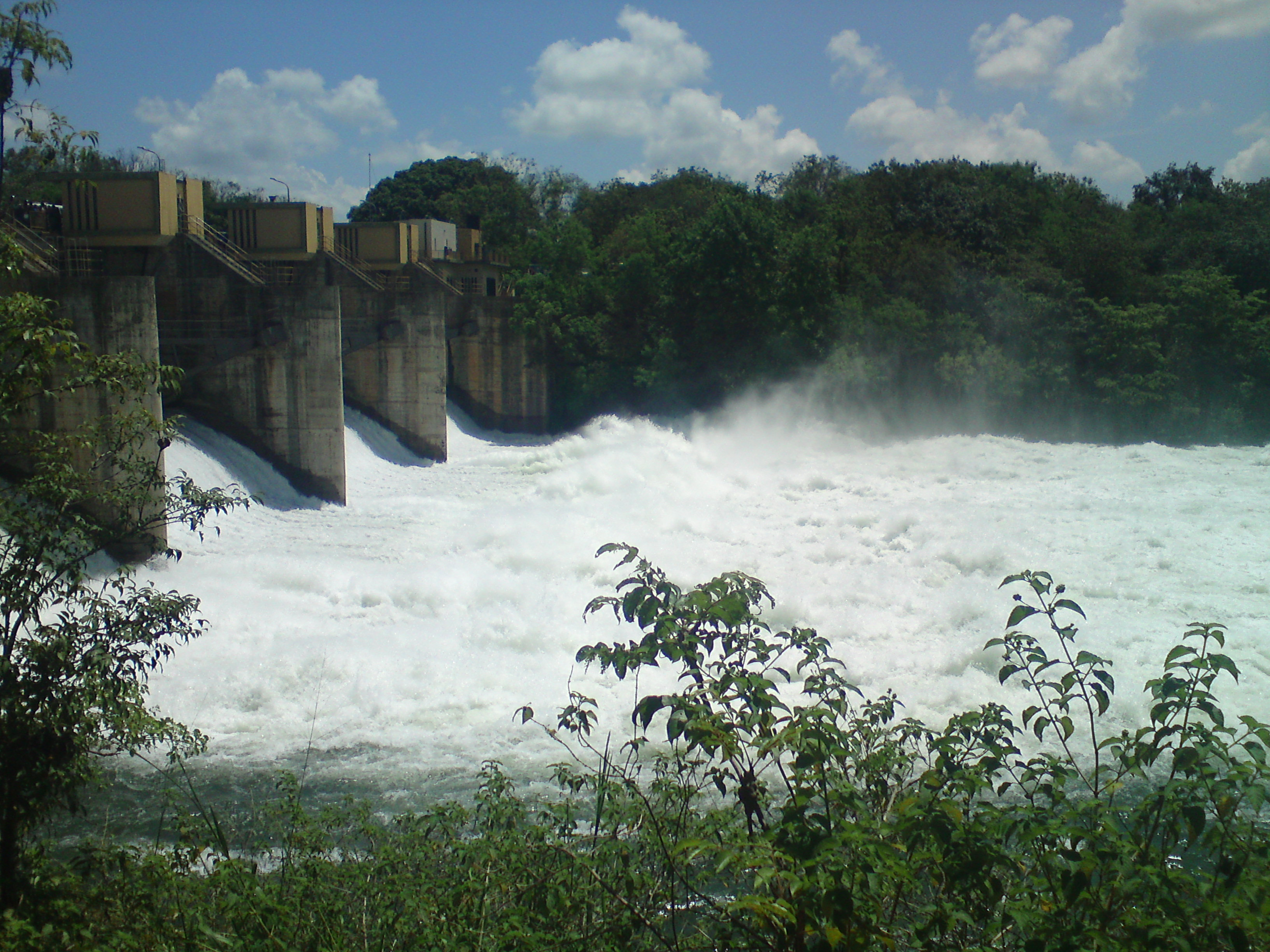
- The dam with all four spillways open.
- Interactive map of Uda Walawe Dam
- Country: Sri Lanka
- Location: Udawalawe
- Coordinates: 06°26′02″N 80°51′15″E
- Purpose: Irrigation, Power
- Status: Operational

Dam and spillways
- Type of dam: Embankment dam
- Impounds: Walawe River
- Length: 3.9 km (2.4 mi)
- Spillways: 4
- Spillway type: Tainter gate

Reservoir
- Creates: Udawalawe Reservoir
- Total capacity: 267MCM
- Maximum length: 8.6 km (5.3 mi)
- Maximum width: 7 km (4.3 mi)

Udawalawe Power Station
- Coordinates: 06°25′55″N 80°51′02″E
- Operator: CEB
- Commission date: April 1969
- Type: Conventional
- Turbines: 3 × 2 MW
- Installed capacity: 6 MW

The Udawalawe Dam is a large irrigation dam in Udawalawe, in the Uva province of Sri Lanka. The dam consists of an embankment section and a gravity section, combining the total dam length to approximately 3.9 km (2.4 mi). The dam is also used for hydroelectric power generation, powering two 2 MW units, commissioned in April 1969.

The water level of the reservoir is controlled by the five tainter gate spillways located at the eastern end of the dam, with two additional spillways located towards the centre of the dam. The reservoir measures approximately 8.6 km (5.3 mi) in length, with a maximum perpendicular width of 7 km (4.3 mi).

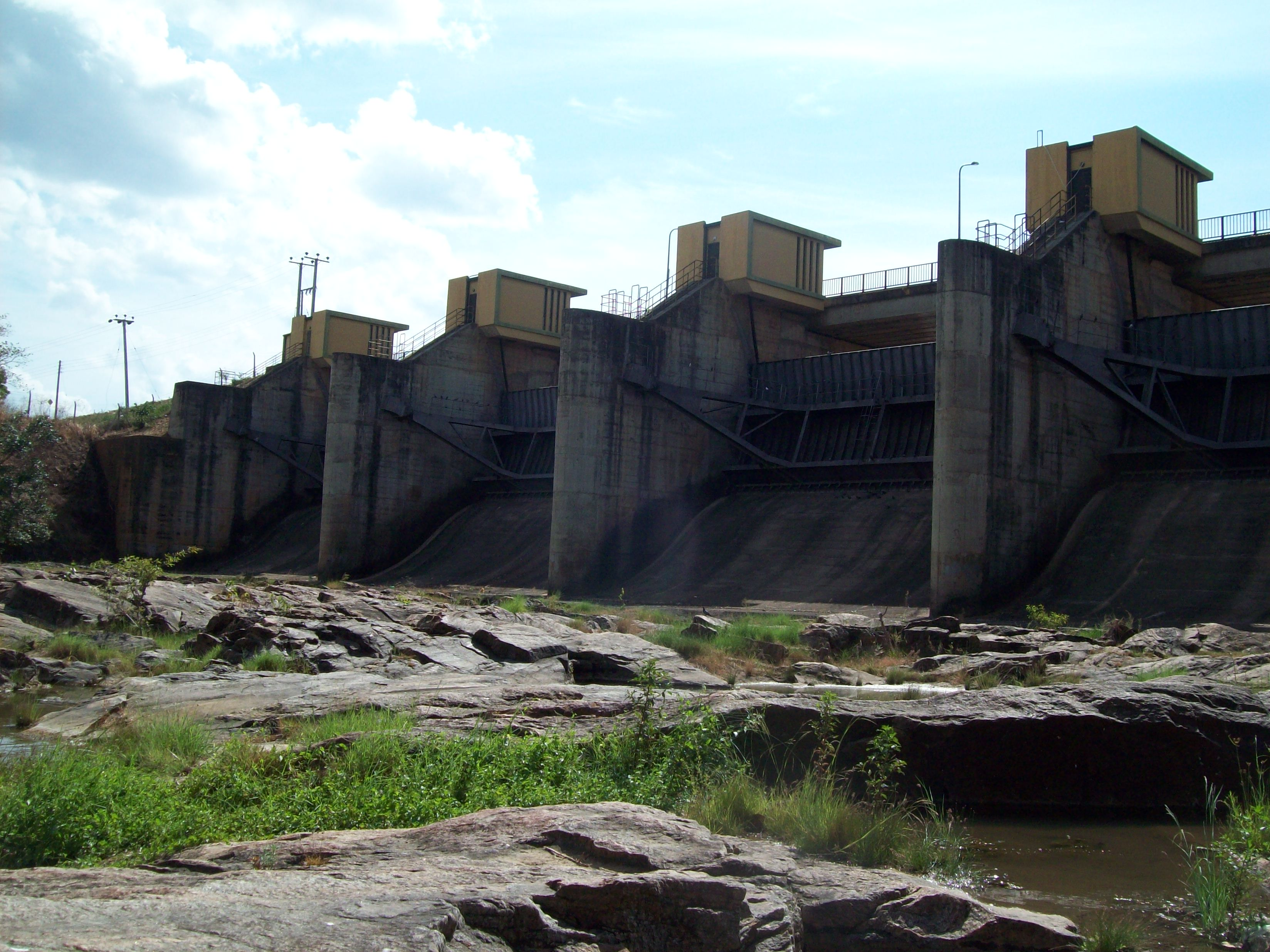
The four tainter gate spillways.

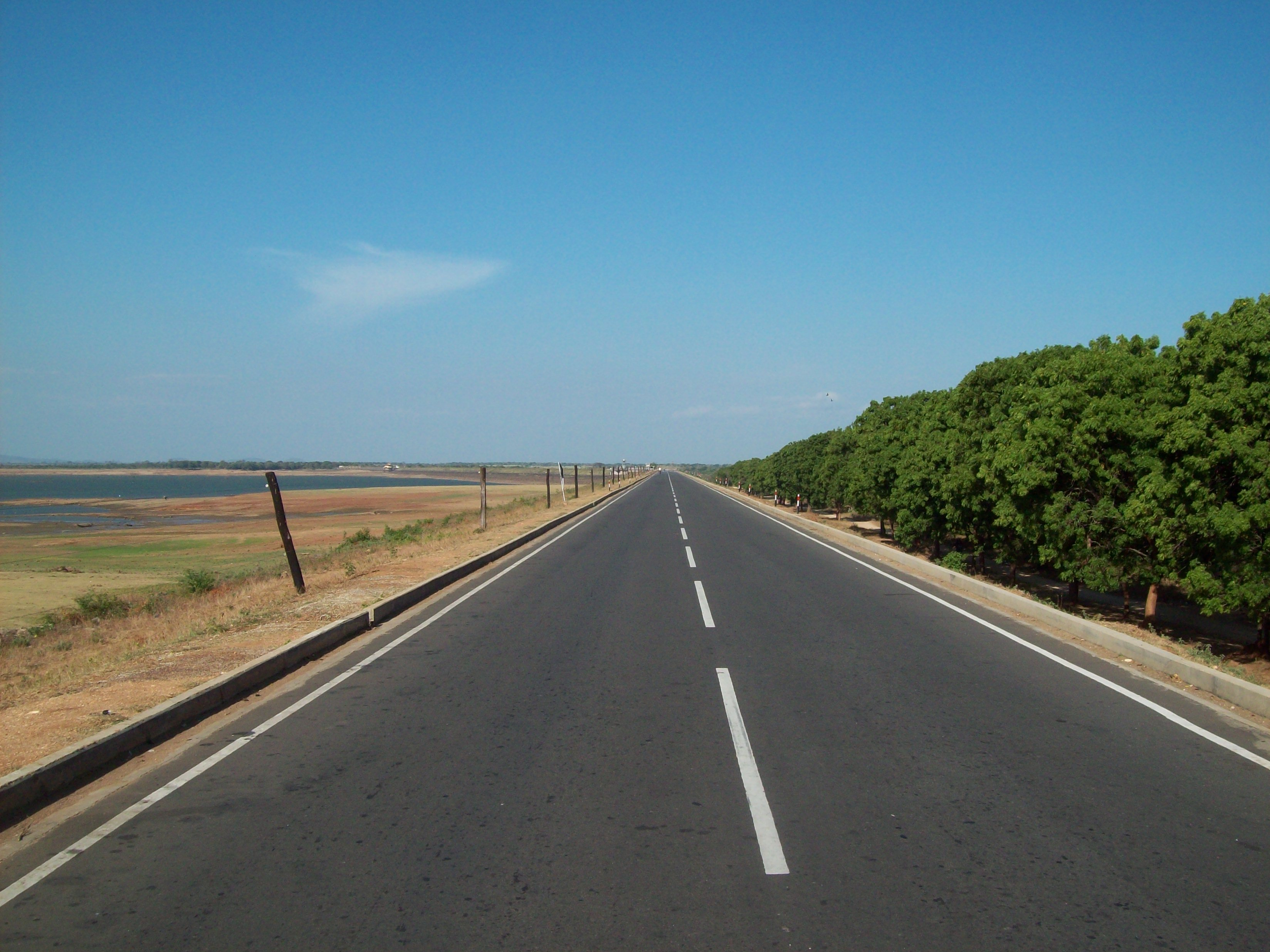
Road over the larger embankment dam.

== See also ==
- Electricity in Sri Lanka
- List of dams and reservoirs in Sri Lanka
- List of power stations in Sri Lanka
