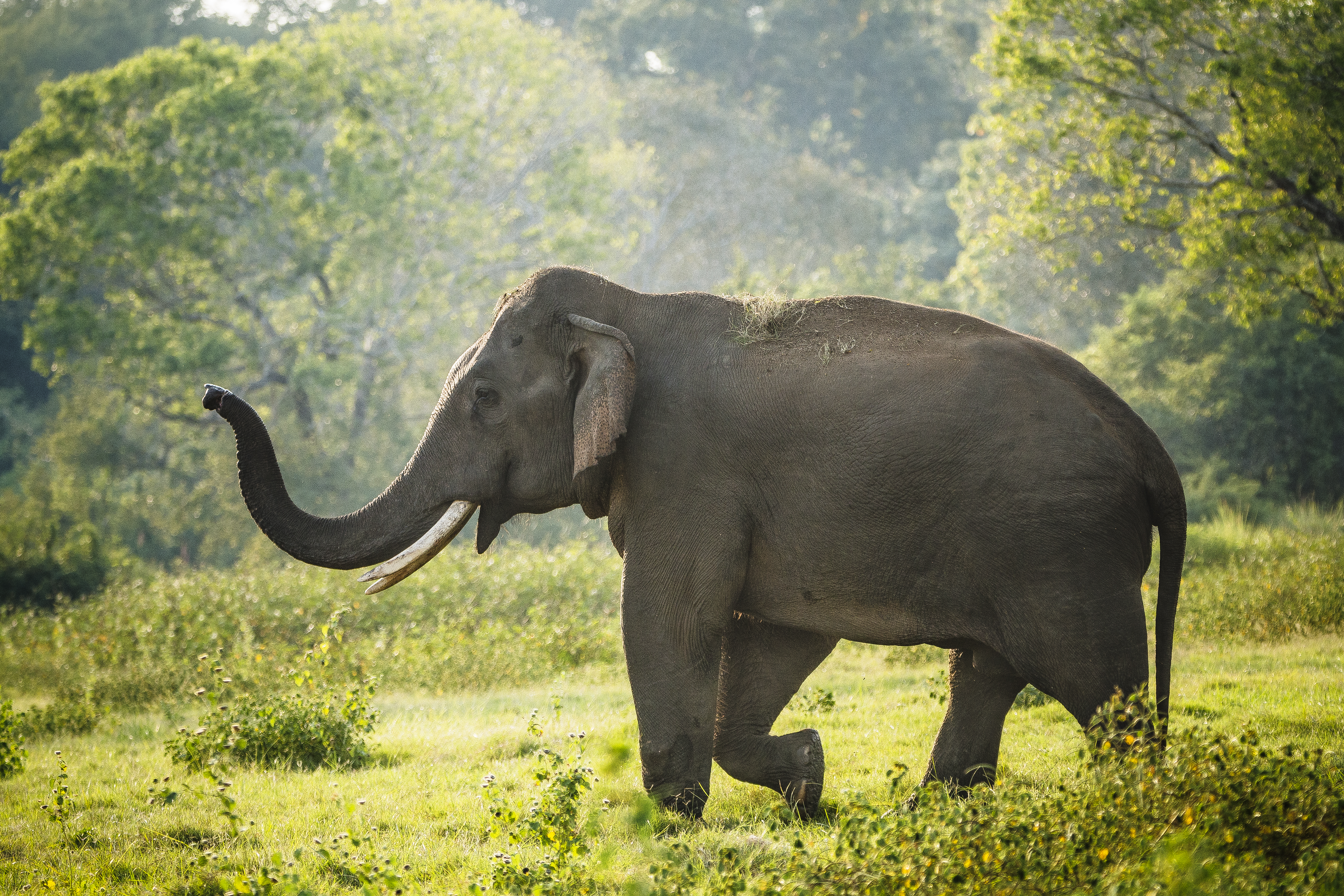
- Male tusker
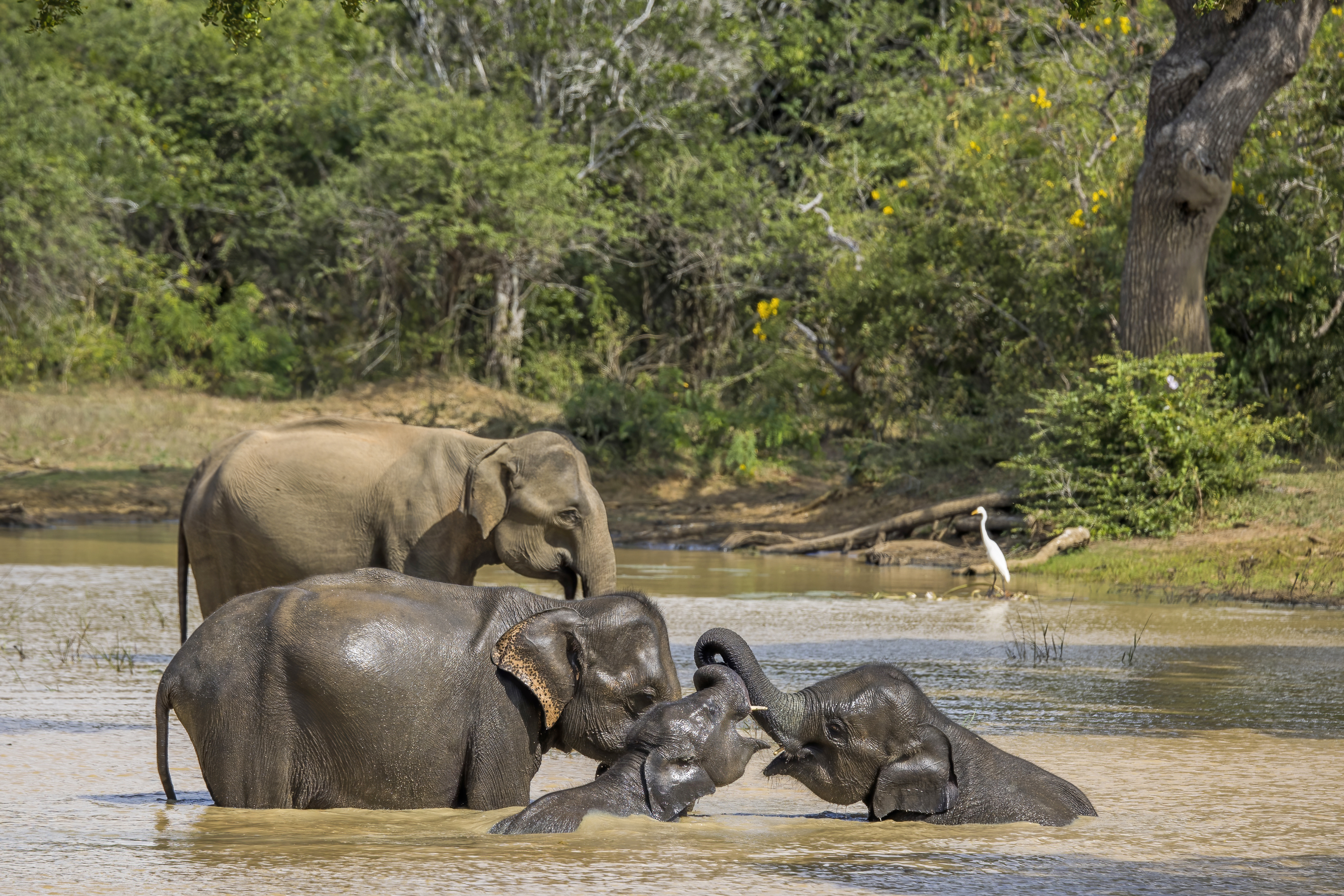
- Female and juveniles in Yala National Park

Scientific classification
- Kingdom: Animalia
- Phylum: Chordata
- Class: Mammalia
- Order: Proboscidea
- Family: Elephantidae
- Genus: Elephas
- Species: E. maximus
- Subspecies: E. m. maximus

Trinomial name
- Elephas maximus maximus Linnaeus, 1758
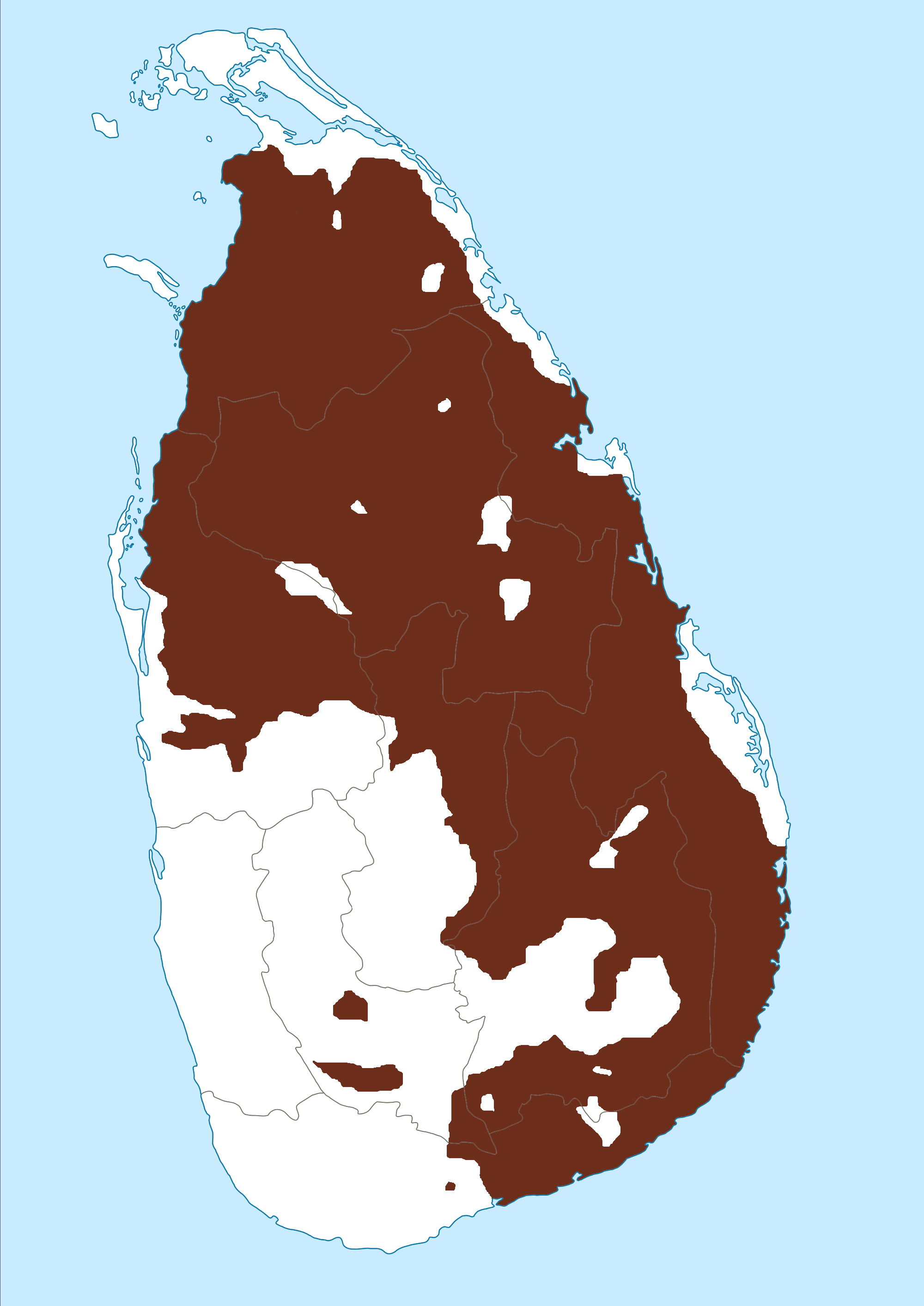
- Range of the Sri Lankan elephant

= Sri Lankan elephant =

Subspecies of the Asian elephant

The Sri Lankan elephant (Elephas maximus maximus) is native to Sri Lanka and one of three recognised subspecies of the Asian elephant. It is the type subspecies of the Asian elephant and was first described by Carl Linnaeus under the binomial Elephas maximus in 1758. The Sri Lankan elephant population is now largely restricted to the dry zone in the north, east and southeast of Sri Lanka. Elephants are present in Udawalawe National Park, Yala National Park, Lunugamvehera National Park, Wilpattu National Park and Minneriya National Park but also live outside protected areas. It is estimated that Sri Lanka has the highest density of elephants in Asia. Human-elephant conflict is increasing due to conversion of elephant habitat to settlements and permanent cultivation.

== Characteristics ==
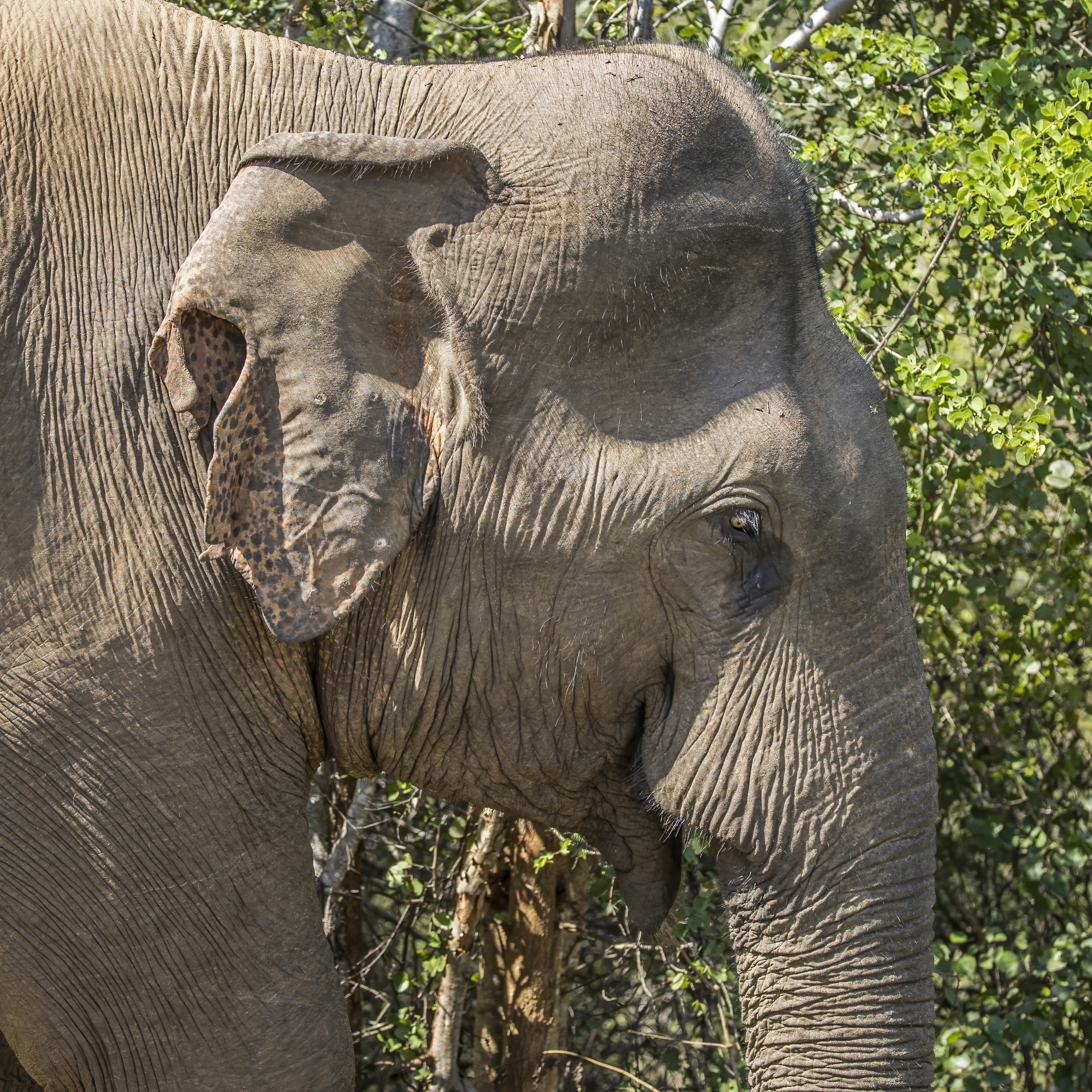
Head of a male without tusks

The Sri Lankan elephant is the largest subspecies reaching a shoulder height of between 2 and 3.5 m (6 ft 7 in and 11 ft 6 in), weighing between 2,000 and 5,500 kg (4,400 and 12,100 lb). It has 19 pairs of ribs. Its skin colour is darker than of indicus and of sumatranus with larger and more distinct patches of depigmentation on the ears, face, trunk and belly. Females are usually smaller than males. 90% of tuskless males are called makhna.

Only 7% of males bear tusks that grow up to about 1.8 m (6 ft) and weigh up to 35 kg (77 lb). Millangoda Raja had the longest tusks of 7 ft 6 in (2.29 m).

The Sri Lankan subspecies designation is weakly supported by analysis of allozyme loci, but not by analysis of mitochondrial DNA (mtDNA) sequences.

In July 2013, a dwarf Sri Lankan elephant was sighted in Udawalawe National Park. It was over 1.5 m (5 ft) tall but had shorter legs than usual and was the main aggressor in an encounter with a younger bull.

== Distribution and habitat ==
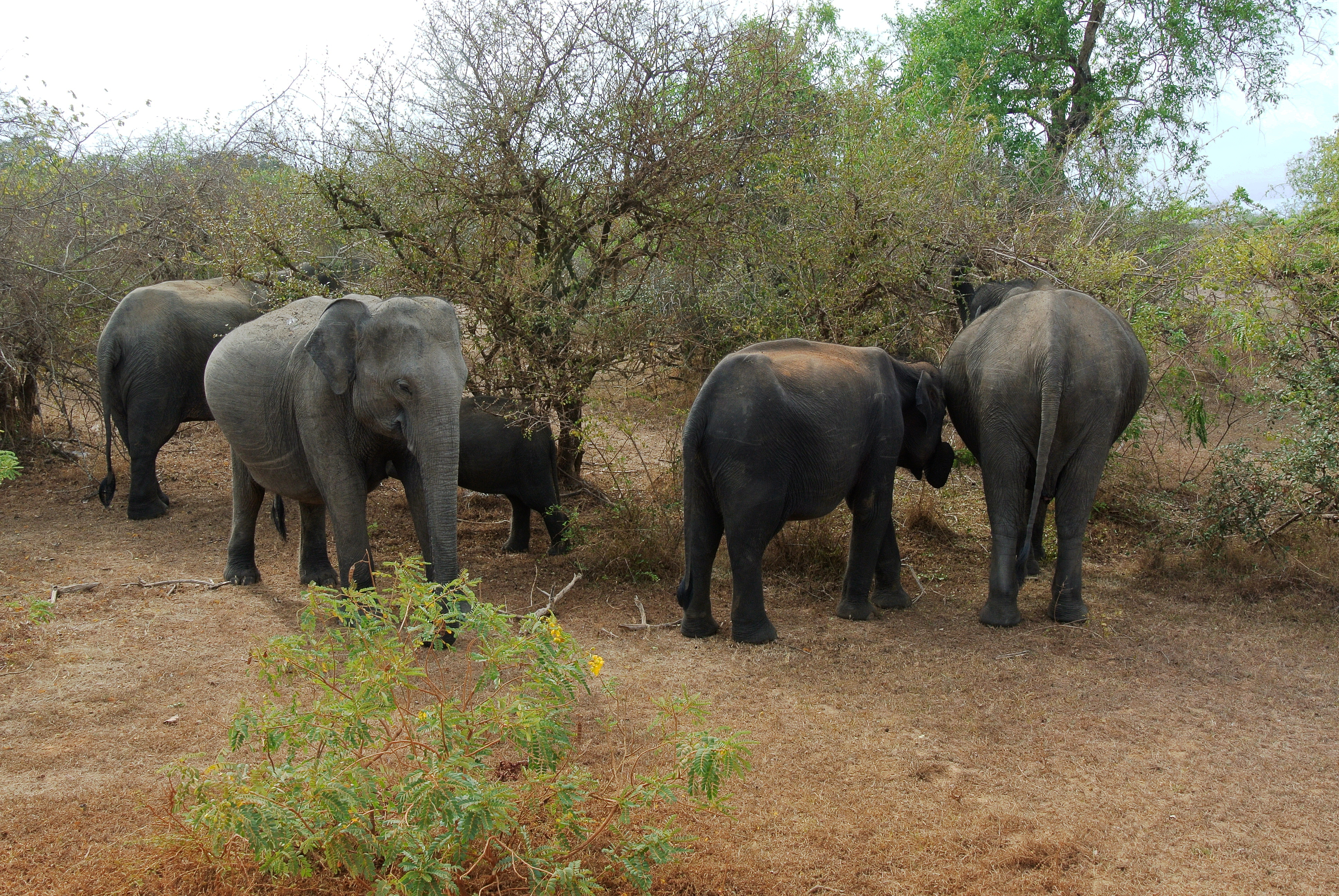
A herd of elephants in Yala National Park

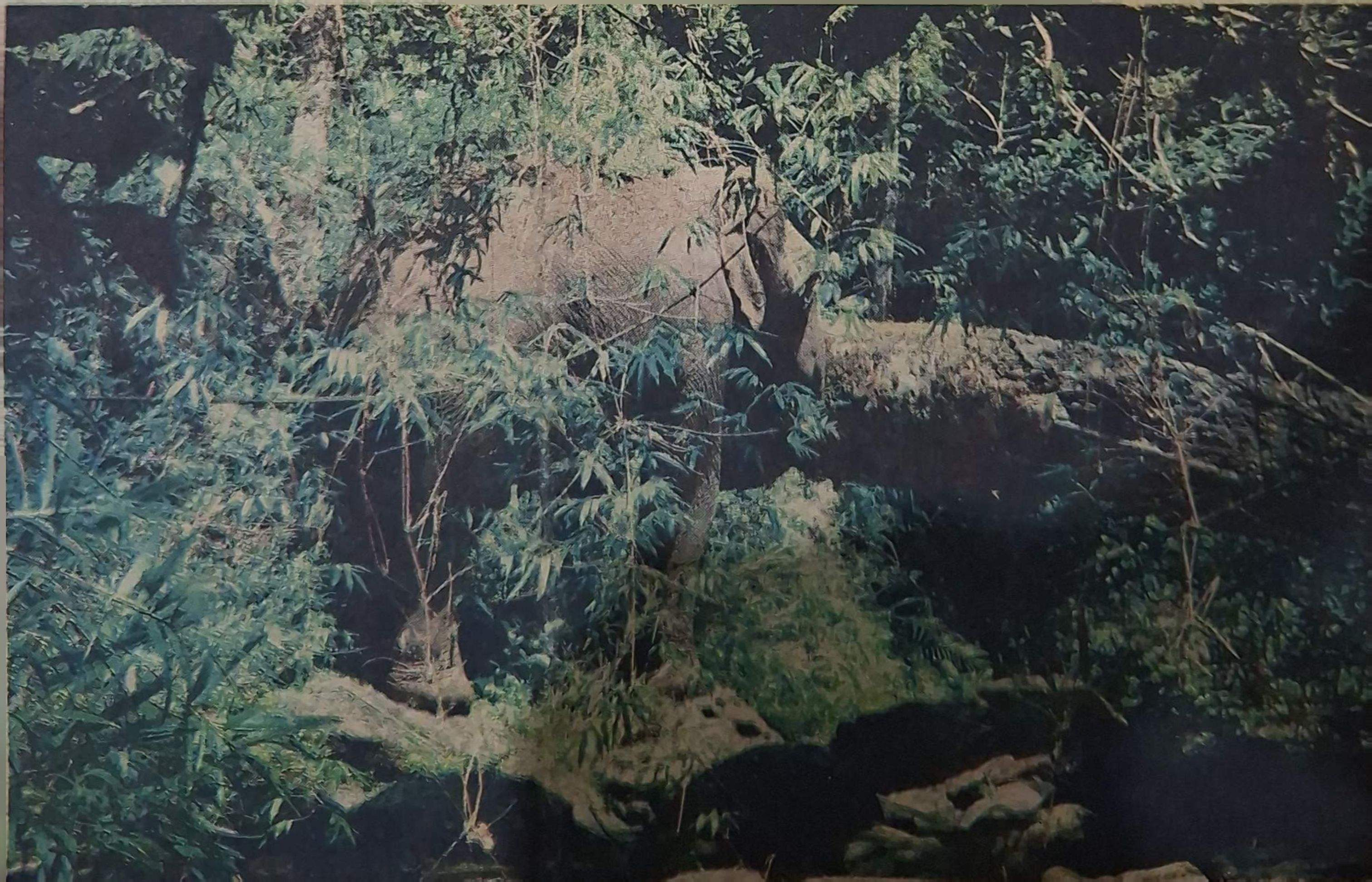
Elephants in Peak Wilderness Sanctuary

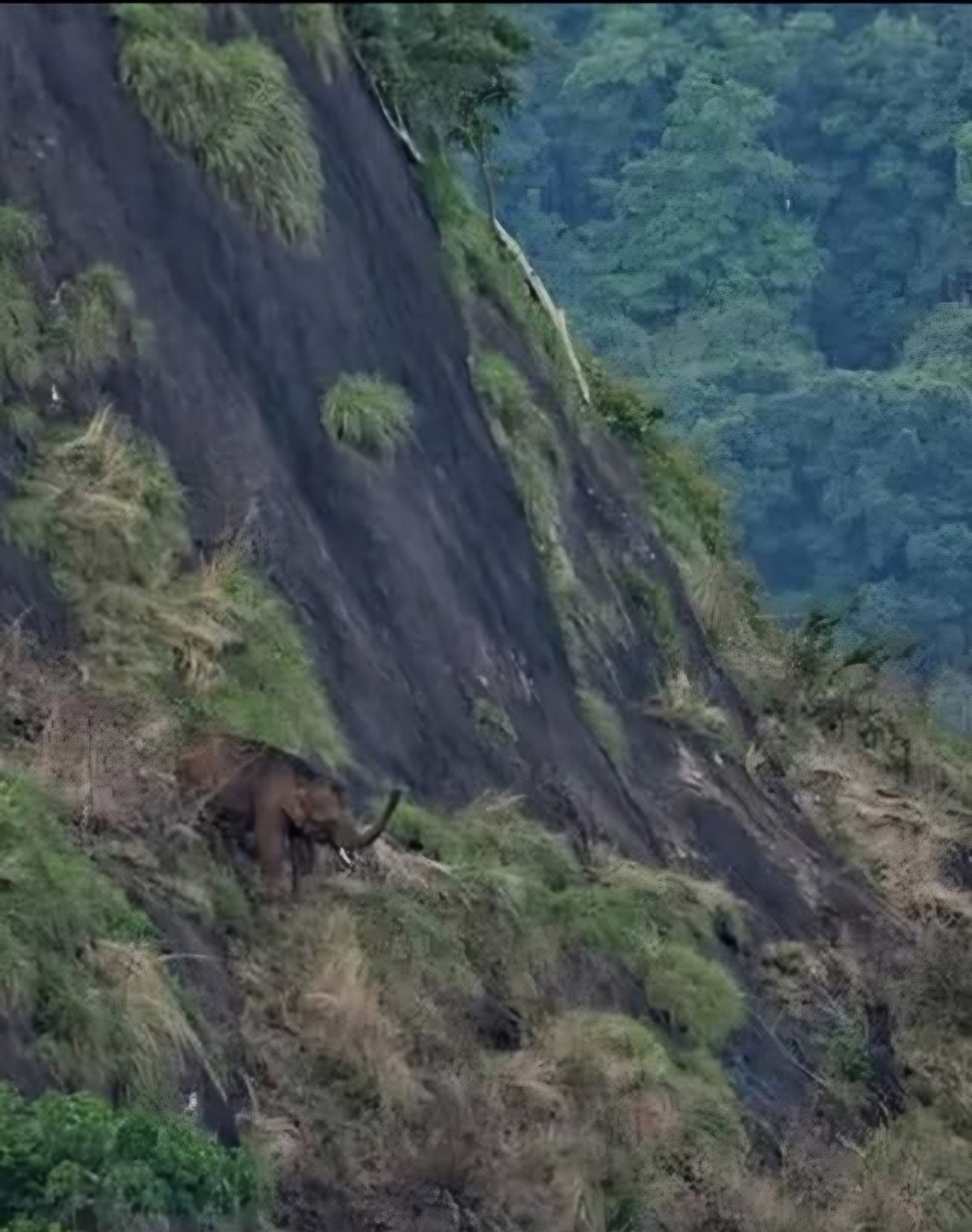
Elephants at the Seven Virgins mountain range in the Peak Wilderness Sanctuary

Sri Lankan elephant herds are restricted mostly to the dry zone lowlands where they are still fairly widespread in northern, eastern and southern Sri Lanka. A small remnant population exists in Peak Wilderness Sanctuary. Most protected areas of Sri Lanka are less than 1,000 km^{2} (390 sq mi) in extent, apart from Wilpattu and Ruhuna National Parks; and areas with less than 50 km^{2} (19 sq mi) are too small to encompass the entire home ranges of elephants that use them. Wasgomuwa National Park, Flood Plains National Park and Somawathiya National Park have been linked so that the protected area complex contains 1,172 km^{2} (453 sq mi) of contiguous habitat. Nevertheless, as of 2006 about 65% of the Sri Lankan elephant's range was thought to extend outside protected areas.

Sinharaja Forest Reserve supports the last two remaining rainforest elephant individuals.

Elephants in Sinharaja Forest Reserve

=== Former range ===
In the historical past, elephants were widely distributed from sea level to the highest mountain ranges. They occurred in the dry zone, in the lowland wet zone as well as in the cold damp montane forests. During the colonial period from 1505 to 1948, the wet zone was converted to commercially used fields and became heavily settled. Until 1830, elephants were so plentiful that their destruction was encouraged by the government, and rewards were paid for any that was killed. In the first half of the 19th century, forests in the montane zone were cleared large-scale for the planting of coffee, and afterward tea. The elephant population in the mountains was extirpated. During the British rule, many bull elephants were killed by trophy hunters. One of the British army majors is credited with having shot over 1,500 elephants, and two others are reputed to have shot half that number each. Many other sportsmen have shot about 250–300 animals during this time. Between 1829 and 1855 alone, more than 6,000 elephants were captured and shot under order of colonial British Empire.

By the turn of the 20th century, elephants were still distributed over much of the island. The area currently known as Ruhuna National Park was the Resident Sportsmen's Shooting Reserve, an area reserved for the sporting pleasure of British residents in the country. In the early 20th century, mega reservoirs were constructed in the dry zone for irrigated agriculture. Ancient irrigation systems were rehabilitated and people resettled. This development gathered momentum after the independence in 1948. As a result, elephant habitat in the dry zone was severely fragmented.

=== Population trend ===
The wild Sri Lankan elephant population is thought to have experienced a 21% decline in birth rate since about 2012. The birth rate of male elephants has fallen compared to that of female elephants.

The size of wild elephant populations in Sri Lanka was estimated at:

Year	Population
early 19th century	19,500
early 20th century	10,000
1969	1,745–2,455
1987	2,500–3,435
1993	1,967
2000	3,150–4,400
2011	5,879
2019	7,500

Important protected areas for the elephant in Sri Lanka
Name of the national park	Size in sq.km	Number of elephants
Wilpattu	1,316.9	100–150
Yala	1,267.8	300–350
Gal Oya	629.4	150–200
Maduru Oya	588.5	150–200
Victoria–Randenigala	400.8	40–60
Somawathiya	377.6	50–100
Wasgomuwa	377.1	150–200
Madhu road	346.8	100–200
Udawalawe	308.2	150–200
Peak Wilderness	223.8	50–60
Flood Plains	173.5	50–100
Sinharaja	88.6	10–50
Minneriya–Giritale	66.9	300–400
Bundala	62.1	80–100
Lahugala–Kitulana	15.5	50–100

== Behaviour and ecology ==
Elephant feeding on grass in Yala National Park (video)

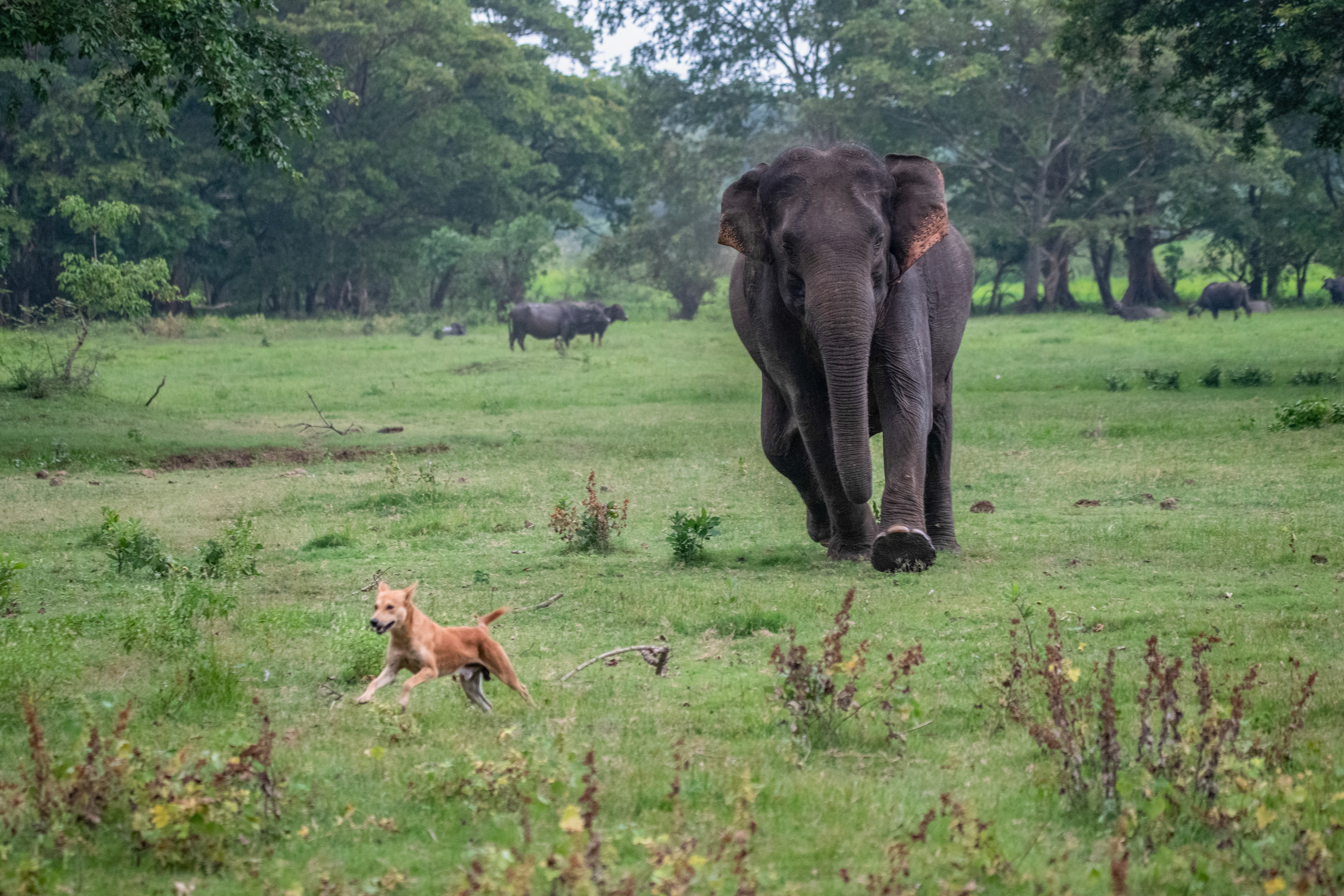
An elephant charging a dog

The annual elephant gathering and migration in the Minneriya National Park

The Sri Lankan elephant communicates using visual, acoustic and chemical signals. At least fourteen different vocal and acoustic signals have been described, which include some low-frequency calls that contain infrasonic frequencies. Females and calves generally form small, loosely associated social groups without a hierarchical tier structure.

Elephants are classified as megaherbivores and consume up to 150 kg (330 lb) of plant matter per day. As generalists, they feed on a wide variety of food plants. In Sri Lanka's northwestern region, feeding behaviour of elephants was observed during the period of January 1998 to December 1999. The elephants fed on a total of 116 plant species belonging to 35 families including 27 species of cultivated plants. More than half of the plants were non-tree species, i.e. shrub, herb, grass, or climbers. More than 25% of the plant species belonged to the family Leguminosae, and 19% of the plant species belonged to the family of true grasses. The presence of cultivated plants in dung does not result solely due to raiding of crops as it was observed that elephants feed on leftover crop plants in fallow chenas. Juvenile elephants tend to feed predominantly on grass species.

Food resources are abundant in regenerating forests, but at low density in mature forests. Traditional slash-and-burn agriculture creates optimum habitat for elephants through promoting successional vegetation.

== Threats ==
During the Sri Lankan Civil War, Sri Lankan elephants were maimed or killed by land mines. Between 1990 and 1994, a total of 261 wild elephants died either as a result of gunshot injuries, or were killed by poachers and land mines. Several elephants stepped on land mines and were crippled. In 1997, 126 elephants were killed by humans: about 2.4 elephants per week.

Poaching for ivory is not a major threat, given the rarity of tuskers. Some ivory trade still goes on, particularly in Kandy. Human population growth and demand for land is a greater threat today, and the range of elephants continues to decline as irrigation and development projects lead to the conversion of natural land to irrigated agriculture and settlements.

Between 1999 and the end of 2006, nearly 100 wild elephants were killed every year to protect crops and houses. During drought seasons many elephants damage agricultural land for food. Nearly 80 elephants were killed in northwestern Sri Lanka, 50 in south and east and another 30 in other parts of the country, totaling 160 elephant deaths in 2006 alone. Sri Lanka has thus become the country with the highest elephant mortality rate worldwide. The Sri Lankan Department of Wildlife Conservation official records showed that 407 elephants were killed in 2019. The next three years after that showed 328, 375, and 439 elephant fatalities, respectively.

Number of elephant deaths since 2010
Year	2010	2011	2012	2013	2014	2015	2016	2017	2018	2019	2020	2021	2022	2023	2024	2025	Total
Deaths	227	255	250	206	239	205	279	256	258	407	328	375	439	488	388	314	4914

Another major threat is plastic consumption. Over the past three decades, many elephants have died after consuming plastic waste, and their lifespan has decreased compared to the average wild lifespan. Elephants eat plastic and human rubbish because of habitat loss, which forces them to move into human-inhabited areas. Government mismanagement of waste dumping near national parks has triggered this crisis, and elephants are not the only animals affected.

== Conservation ==
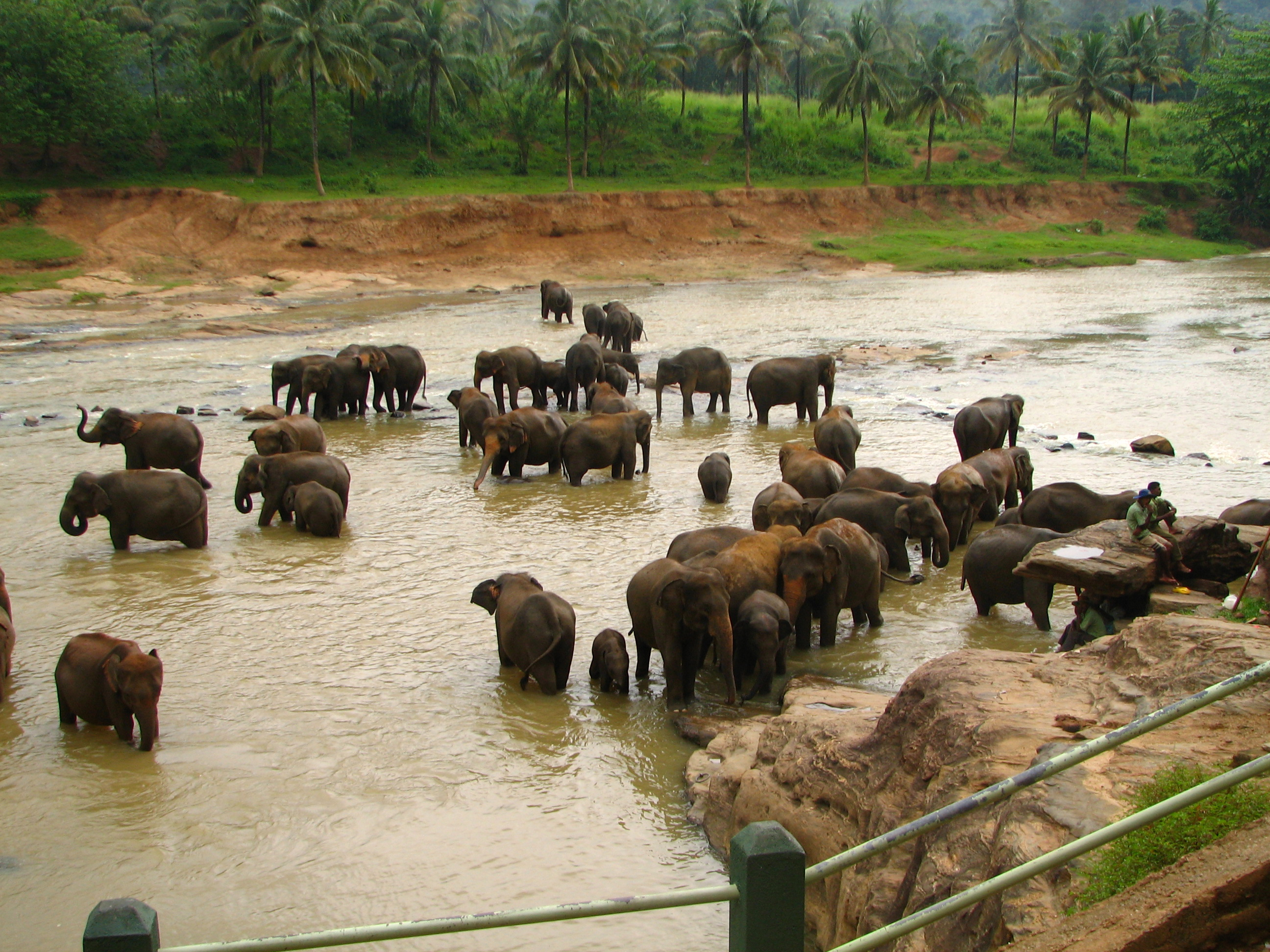
Elephants at the Elephant Orphanage near Kandy

Elephas maximus is listed on CITES Appendix I.

The elephant conservation strategy of the Department of Wildlife Conservation aims at conserving as many viable populations as possible in as wide a range of suitable habitats as is feasible. This means protecting elephants both within the system of protected areas and as many animals outside these areas that the land can support and landholders will accept, and not restricting elephants to the protected area network alone.

- In the Pinnawala Elephant Orphanage in Kegalle injured elephants are treated, and orphaned baby elephants cared for. Nearly 70 elephants live here. Captive breeding is also going on.
- The Udawalawe Elephant Transit Centre in Udawalawe National Park is a rehabilitation centre, where orphaned elephant calves are being kept until they can be released into the wild.

== Culture and symbolism ==
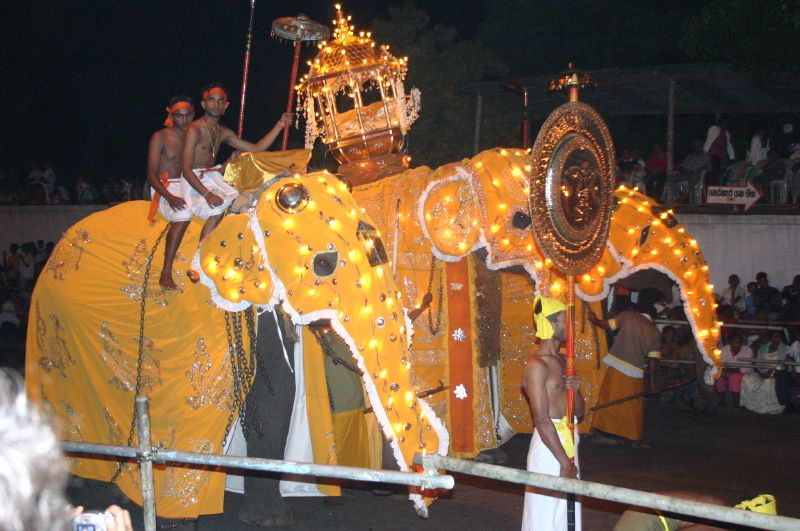
Sri Lankan elephants at the Esala Perahera

Elephants were a common element in Sinhalese and Sri Lankan Tamils heraldry for over two thousand years and remained so through British colonial rule. The coat of arms and the flag of Ceylon Government from 1875 to 1948 included an elephant and even today many institutions use the Sri Lankan elephant in their coat of arms and insignia. An important cultural symbiosis has continued to exist between the elephant and humans for over two thousand years – no religious procession was complete without its retinue of elephants, and many large Buddhist temples and Hindu Temples in Sri Lanka had their own elephants.

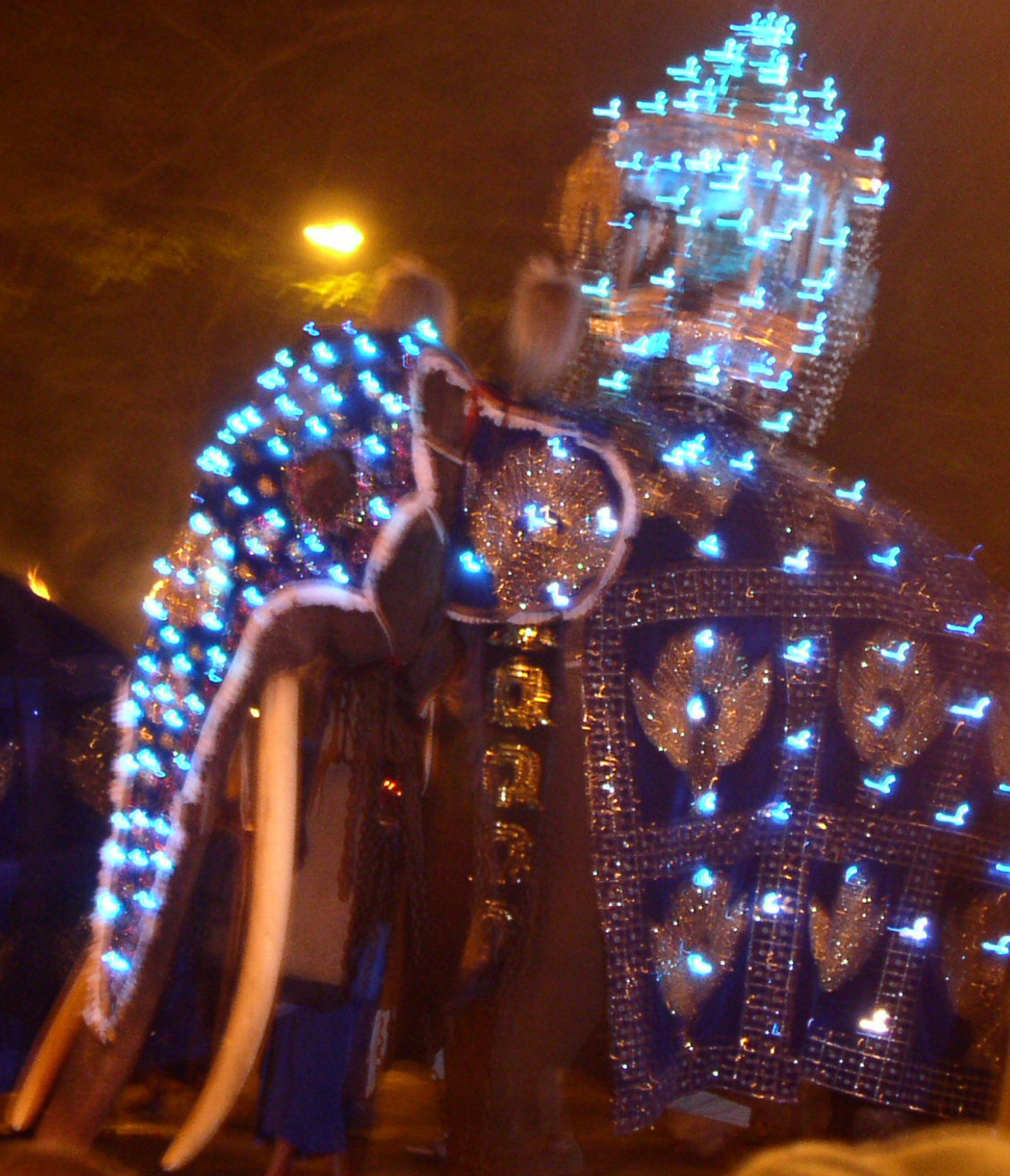
Millangoda Raja, tusker with longest tusks

Since time immemorial, elephants have been domesticated for uses as work elephants and war elephants in Sri Lanka by the ancient kings. Elephants were exported from the island for hundreds of years and into the Portuguese and Dutch colonial era. The British did not export elephants, instead took to hunting wild elephants and capture of wild for domestication as work elephants continued. Elephant Kraals were organised to capture large herds of elephants in the late nineteenth and early twentieth century. The capture of wild elephants were regulated under the Fauna and Flora Protection Ordinance in 1937, with the issuance of permits to capture of wild elephants. This practice stopped following the last Elephant Kraal in 1950 by Sir Francis Molamure. A census of the domesticated elephant population in 1970 indicated 532 elephants among 378 owners, while this number had dropped 344 in 1982. These domesticated elephants were used mainly as work elephants and for cultural pageants, the chief of which is the annual Kandy Esala Perahera. In recent years, the domesticated elephant population has dropped further with the need for their labour dropping widespread use of tractors.

However, they remain in use in terrain inaccessible by vehicles for logging and used for tourism. Ownership of elephants are highly prestigious among Sinhalese as a status symbol and calls have been made for permission to capture wild elephants or release of orphaned wild elephants in government care to Temples to take part in pageants. Captive breeding in private ownership does not take place due to the long period of unemployability associated with it.

Legal reforms pertaining to the captive elephant population was introduced in 2021, just as a landmark case into dozens of calves being stolen from their herds in a ten-year period collapsed with the Attorney General's Department dropping charges and releasing the elephants to their former owners.

== See also ==
- Sri Lankan ivories
- List of mammals of Sri Lanka
