= List of mammals of Sri Lanka =

This is a list of the mammal species recorded in Sri Lanka, with their respective names in Sinhala also listed. There are 125 mammal species in Sri Lanka, of which one is critically endangered, ten are endangered, ten are vulnerable, and three are near threatened.

The following tags are used to highlight each species' conservation status as assessed by the International Union for Conservation of Nature:

EX	Extinct	No reasonable doubt that the last individual has died.
EW	Extinct in the wild	Known only to survive in captivity or as naturalized populations well outside its previous range.
CR	Critically endangered	The species is in imminent risk of extinction in the wild.
EN	Endangered	The species is facing an extremely high risk of extinction in the wild.
VU	Vulnerable	The species is facing a high risk of extinction in the wild.
NT	Near threatened	The species does not yet meet any of the criteria that would categorise it as risking extinction, but it is likely to do so in the future.
LC	Least concern	There are no current identifiable risks to the species.
DD	Data deficient	There is inadequate information to make an assessment of the risks to this species.

Some species were assessed using an earlier set of criteria. Species assessed using this system have the following instead of near threatened and least concern categories:

LR/cd	Lower risk/conservation dependent	Species which were the focus of conservation programmes and may have moved into a higher risk category if that programme had been discontinued.
LR/nt	Lower risk/near threatened	Species which are close to being classified as vulnerable, but are not the subject of conservation programmes.
LR/lc	Lower risk/least concern	Species for which there are no identifiable risks.

== Mammalian diversity ==
Class	Order	Number of species	Endemic species	Endemism
Mammals	Sirenia	1	-	-
Mammals	Proboscidea	1	-	-
Mammals	Primates	5	3	60%
Mammals	Rodentia	23	7	30.4%
Mammals	Lagomorpha	1	-	-
Mammals	Eulipotyphla	10	6	60%
Mammals	Chiroptera	30	-	-
Mammals	Carnivora	16	3	18.75%
Mammals	Pholidota	1	-	-
Mammals	Artiodactyla	8	2	25%
Mammals	Perissodactyla	2	-	-
Mammals	Cetacea	27	-	-

=== Order: Proboscidea (elephants) ===
Name	Binomial	Subspecies	Status
Asian elephant අලියා	Elephas maximus	Sri Lankan elephant, Elephas maximus maximus	Endangered

=== Order: Sirenia (sea cows) ===
Sirenia is an order of fully aquatic, herbivorous mammals that inhabit rivers, estuaries, coastal marine waters, swamps, and marine wetlands. All four species are endangered.

Name	Binomial	Subspecies	Status
Dugong මුහුදු ඌරා	Dugong dugon		VU

=== Order: Primates ===
The order Primates contains humans and their closest relatives: lemurs, lorisoids, monkeys, and apes.

Name	Binomial	Subspecies	Status
Gray slender loris අලු උණහපුලුවා	Loris lydekkerianus	Northern Ceylonese slender loris, Loris lydekkerianus nordicus; Highland slender loris, Loris lydekkerianus grandis	Least concern
Red slender loris ශ්‍රී ලංකා රත් උණහපුලුවා	Loris tardigradus	Mountain slender loris, Loris tardigradus nycticeboides; Lowland slender loris, Loris tardigradus tardigradus	Endangered
Toque macaque රිලවා	Macaca sinica	Dryzone toque macaque, Macaca sinica sinica; Wetzone toque macaque, Macaca sinica aurifrons; Highland toque macaque, Macaca sinica opisthomelas	Endangered
Tufted gray langur හැලි වඳුරා	Semnopithecus priam	Sri Lanka tufted grey langur, Semnopithecus priam thersites	Near threatened
Purple-faced langur ශ්‍රී ලංකා කලු වඳුරා	Semnopithecus vetulus	Southern lowland wetzone purple-faced langur, Trachypithecus vetulus vetulus; Western purple-faced langur, Trachypithecus vetulus nestor; Dryzone purple-faced langur, Trachypithecus vetulus philbricki; Bear monkey, Trachypithecus vetulus monticola; Northern purple-faced langur, Trachypithecus vetulus harti (not yet given validity)	Endangered

=== Order: Rodentia (rodents) ===
Rodents make up the largest order of mammals, with over 40% of mammalian species. They have two incisors in the upper and lower jaw which grow continually and must be kept short by gnawing. Most rodents are small though the capybara can weigh up to 45 kg (99 lb).

Name	Binomial	Subspecies	Status
Lesser bandicoot rat මහ ඌරු මීයා	Bandicota bengalensis		Least concern
Greater bandicoot rat හීන් ඌරු මීයා	Bandicota indica		Least concern
Layard's palm squirrel ශ්‍රී ලංකා මූකලන් ලේනා	Funambulus layardi		Vulnerable
Dusky striped squirrel ශ්‍රී ලංකා පුංචි ලේනා	Funambulus obscurus		Vulnerable
Indian palm squirrel ලේනා	Funambulus palmarum	Funambulus palmarum palmarum	Least concern
Indian bush rat පදුරු මීයා	Golunda ellioti		Least concern
Indian porcupine ඉත්තෑවා	Hystrix indica		Least concern
Blanford's rat වලිග සුදු වන මීයා	Madromys blanfordi		Least concern
Soft-furred rat කෙස් මුදු කෙත් මීයා	Millardia meltada		Least concern
Little Indian field mouse වෙල් හීන් මීයා	Mus booduga		Least concern
Ceylon spiny mouse ශ්‍රී ලංකා ක‍ටු හීන් මීයා	Mus fernandoni		Endangered
Mayor's mouse ශ්‍රී ලංකා දෙපැහැ ක‍ටු හීන් මීයා	Mus mayori		Vulnerable
House mouse ගෙවල් මීයා	Mus musculus	Mus musculus castaneus	Least concern
Indian giant flying squirrel මහ හම්බාවා	Petaurista philippensis		Least concern
Travancore flying squirrel හීන් හම්බාවා	Petinomys fuscocapillus	Petinomys fuscocapillus layardi	Near threatened
Nillu rat නෙලූ මීයා	Rattus montanus		Endangered
Brown rat පොදු ගේ මීයා	Rattus norvegicus		Least concern
Grizzled giant squirrel දඬු ලේනා	Ratufa macroura	Highland giant squirrel, Ratufa macroura macroura; Dryzone giant squirrel, Ratufa macroura dandolena; Intermediate giant squirrel, Ratufa macroura melanochra	Near threatened
Ohiya rat ශ්‍රී ලංකා දෙපැහැ මීයා	Srilankamys ohiensis		Vulnerable
Indian gerbil වැලි මීයා	Tatera indica		Least concern
Asiatic long-tailed climbing mouse ගස් මීයා	Vandeleuria oleracea		Least concern

=== Order: Lagomorpha (lagomorphs) ===
The lagomorphs comprise two families, Leporidae (hares and rabbits), and Ochotonidae (pikas). Though they can resemble rodents, and were classified as a superfamily in that order until the early 20th century, they have since been considered a separate order. They differ from rodents in a number of physical characteristics, such as having four incisors in the upper jaw rather than two.

Name	Binomial	Subspecies	Status
Indian hare වල් හාවා	Lepus nigricollis	L. n. singhala	LC

=== Order: Soricomorpha (shrews, moles, and solenodons) ===
The "shrew-forms" are insectivorous mammals. The shrews and solenodons closely resemble mice, while the moles are stout-bodied burrowers.

Name	Binomial	Subspecies	Status
Sinharaja shrew ශ්‍රී ලංකා සිංහරාජ කුණු හික් මීයා	Crocidura hikmiya		Endangered
Horsefield's shrew කුණු හික් මීයා	Crocidura horsfieldii		Data deficient
Sri Lankan long-tailed shrew ශ්‍රී ලංකා කුණු හික් මීයා	Crocidura miya		Endangered
Kelaart's long-clawed shrew පිරි හික් මීයා	Feroculus feroculus		Endangered
Pearson's long-clawed shrew ශ්‍රී ලංකා නිය දිගු මාහික් මීයා	Solisorex pearsoni		Endangered
Etruscan shrew පොඩි හික් මීයා	Suncus etruscus		Least concern
Sri Lanka shrew ශ්‍රී ලංකා පොඩි හික් මීයා	Suncus fellowesgordoni		Endangered
Sri Lanka highland shrew ශ්‍රී ලංකා කදු හික් මීයා	Suncus montanus		Vulnerable
Asian house shrew පොදු හික් මීයා	Suncus murinus		Least concern
Jungle shrew ශ්‍රී ලංකා කැලෑ හික් මීයා	Suncus zeylanicus		Endangered

=== Order: Chiroptera (bats) ===
The bats' most distinguishing feature is that their forelimbs are developed as wings, making them the only mammals capable of flight. Bat species account for about 20% of all mammals.

Name	Binomial	Subspecies	Status
Lesser short-nosed fruit bat හීන් තල වවුලා	Cynopterus brachyotis		LC
Greater short-nosed fruit bat තල වවුලා	Cynopterus sphinx		Least concern
Indian flying fox මා වවුලා	Pteropus giganteus		LC
Leschenault's rousette බොර කහ පලා වවුලා	Rousettus leschenaulti		Least concern
Hardwicke's woolly bat හාඩ්විකිගේ කිරි වවුලා	Kerivoula hardwickii		Least concern
Painted bat රත් බොර කිරි වවුලා	Kerivoula picta		Least concern
Lesser large-footed bat බොර වවුලා	Myotis hasseltii		Least concern
Chocolate pipistrelle බොර හීන් වවුලා	Falsistrellus affinis		Least concern
Tickell's bat අවර වවුලා	Hesperoptenus tickelli		Least concern
Kelaart's pipistrelle රත් බොර කොස්ඇට වවුලා	Pipistrellus ceylonicus		Least concern
Indian pipistrelle ඉන්දු කොස්ඇට වවුලා	Pipistrellus coromandra		Least concern
Greater Asiatic yellow bat මහ කහ වවුලා	Scotophilus heathii		Least concern
Lesser Asiatic yellow bat හීන් කහ වවුලා	Scotophilus kuhlii		Least concern
Round-eared tube-nosed bat නළ නැහැ වවුලා	Murina cyclotis		Least concern
Eastern bent-wing bat දික්පිය වවුලා	Miniopterus fuliginosus		Least concern
Wrinkle-lipped free-tailed bat පොදු ‍රැලිතොල් වවුලා	Chaerephon plicata		Least concern
Egyptian free-tailed bat මහදිව් ‍රැලිතොල් වවුලා	Tadarida aegyptiaca		Least concern
Naked-rumped pouched bat පැස්පිරී වවුලා	Saccolaimus saccolaimus		Least concern
Long-winged tomb bat දික්බා කෙපුලුම් වවුලා	Taphozous longimanus		Least concern
Black-bearded tomb bat රැවුලකලු කෙපුලුම් වවුලා	Taphozous melanopogon		Least concern
Greater false vampire bat මහ බොරු ලේ වවුලා	Megaderma lyra		Least concern
Lesser false vampire bat කන්දිගු බොරු ලේ වවුලා	Megaderma spasma		Least concern
Lesser woolly horseshoe bat හීන් අස්ලාඩම් වවුලා	Rhinolophus beddomei		Least concern
Woolly horseshoe bat අස්ලාඩම් වවුලා	Rhinolophus luctus		Least concern
Rufous horseshoe bat බොරත් අස්ලාඩම් වවුලා	Rhinolophus rouxi		Least concern
Dusky leaf-nosed bat දෙපැහැ පත්නැහැ වවුලා	Hipposideros ater		Least concern
Fulvus roundleaf bat මැලෑකහ පත්නැහැ වවුලා	Hipposideros fulvus		Least concern
Cantor's roundleaf bat කෙස්දිගු පත්නැහැ වවුලා	Hipposideros galeritus		Least concern
Indian roundleaf bat මහ පත්නැහැ වවුලා	Hipposideros lankadiva		Least concern
Schneider's leaf-nosed bat කෙස්කෙටි පත්නැහැ වවුලා	Hipposideros speoris		Least concern

=== Order: Pholidota (pangolins) ===
The order Pholidota comprises the eight species of pangolin. Pangolins are anteaters and have the powerful claws, elongated snout and long tongue seen in the other unrelated anteater species.

Name	Binomial	Subspecies	Status
Indian pangolin කබල්ලෑවා	Manis crassicaudata		EN

=== Order: Cetacea (cetaceans) ===
The order Cetacea includes whales, dolphins and porpoises. They are the mammals most fully adapted to aquatic life with a spindle-shaped nearly hairless body, protected by a thick layer of blubber, and forelimbs and tail modified to provide propulsion underwater.

Name	Binomial	Subspecies	Status
Minke whale මින්කි තල්මසා	Balaenoptera acutorostrata	Dwarf minke whale	Least concern
Bryde's whale බ්ර්ය්ඩ් තල්මසා	Balaenoptera edeni	Indo-Pacific Bryde's whale	Data deficient
Blue whale නිල් තල්මසා	Balaenoptera musculus	Pygmy blue whale, Balaenoptera musculus brevicauda	Endangered
Fin whale වරල් තල්මසා	Balaenoptera physalus	Southern fin whale, Balaenoptera physalus quoyi	Endangered
Humpback whale මොල්ලි තල්මසා	Megaptera novaeangliae	Megaptera novaeangliae (Arabian Sea subpopulation)	Endangered
Finless porpoise අවරල් දෙනුවා	Neophocaena phocaenoides	Neophocaena phocaenoides phocaenoides	Vulnerable
Sperm whale මන්ද තල්මසා	Physeter macrocephalus		Vulnerable
Pygmy sperm whale කුරු මන්ද තල්මසා	Kogia breviceps		Data deficient
Dwarf sperm whale මිටි මන්ද තල්මසා	Kogia sima		Data deficient
Cuvier's beaked whale කුවියර් උල් තල්මසා	Ziphius cavirostris		Least concern
Blainville's beaked whale බ්ලේයින් හොබු තල්මසා	Mesoplodon densirostris		Data deficient
Ginkgo-toothed beaked whale හොබු තල්මසා	Mesoplodon ginkgodens		Data deficient
Deraniyagala's beaked whale දැරණිලගලගේ උල්හොට තල්මසා	Mesoplodon hotaula		-
Risso's dolphin අළු මුල්ලා	Grampus griseus		Least concern
Fraser's dolphin කෙටිහොට මුල්ලා	Lagenodelphis hosei		Least concern
Indo-Pacific humpbacked dolphin ඉන්දු ශාන්තිකර මොල්ලි මුල්ලා	Sousa chinensis		Near threatened
Pantropical spotted dolphin තිත් මුල්ලා	Stenella attenuata	Stenella attenuata attenuata	Least concern
Striped dolphin වෛරම් මුල්ලා	Stenella coeruleoalba		Least concern
Spinner dolphin බමන මුල්ලා	Stenella longirostris	Stenella longirostris longirostris	Data deficient
Rough-toothed dolphin රලුදත් මුල්ලා	Steno bredanensis		Data deficient
Indo-Pacific bottlenose dolphin ඉන්දු පැසි‍ෆික් බෝතල්නාස මුල්ලා	Tursiops aduncus		Data deficient
Bottlenose dolphin බෝතල්නාස මුල්ලා	Tursiops truncatus	Tursiops truncatus (Mediterranean subpopulation)	Least concern
Melon-headed whale පුහුල් ඔළු මුල්ලා	Peponocephala electra		Least concern
Pygmy killer whale කුරු මිනී තල්මසා	Feresa attenuata		Data deficient
False killer whale බොරු මිනී තල්මසා	Pseudorca crassidens		Data deficient
Orca මිනී තල්මසා	Orcinus orca		Data deficient
Short-finned pilot whale නියමු තල්මසා	Globicephala macrorhynchus		Data deficient

=== Order: Carnivora (carnivorans) ===
There are over 260 species of carnivorans, the majority of which feed primarily on meat. They have a characteristic skull shape and dentition.

Name	Binomial	Subspecies	Status
Golden jackal හිවලා	Canis aureus	Sri Lankan jackal, C. a. naria	LC
Jungle cat වල් බළලා / වල් බාවා	Felis chaus	Sri Lankan jungle cat, F. c. kelaarti	LC
Indian grey mongoose මුගටියා	Urva edwardsii		LC
Indian brown mongoose බොර මුගටියා	Urva fusca		LC
Ruddy mongoose හෝතබුවා	Urva smithii		LC
Stripe-necked mongoose මහ මුගටියා	Urva vitticolla	U. v. vitticolla	LC
Eurasian otter දිය බල්ලා	Lutra lutra	L. l. nair	NT
Sloth bear මන්ද වලහා	Melursus ursinus	Sri Lankan sloth bear, M. u. inornatus	VU
Leopard කොටියා	Panthera pardus	Sri Lankan leopard, P. p. kotiya	Endangered
Asian palm civet කලවැද්දා	Paradoxurus hermaphroditus		LC
Golden palm civet ශ්‍රී ලංකා බොර කලවැද්දා	Paradoxurus zeylonensis		VU
Rusty-spotted cat කොල දිවියා	Prionailurus rubiginosus	P. r. phillipsi	NT
Fishing cat හදුන් දිවියා	Prionailurus viverrinus		VU
Small Indian civet උරුලෑවා	Viverricula indica	V. i. mayori	LC

=== Order: Artiodactyla (even-toed ungulates) ===
The even-toed ungulates are ungulates whose weight is borne about equally by the third and fourth toes, rather than mostly or entirely by the third as in perissodactyls. There are about 220 artiodactyl species, including many that are of great economic importance to humans.

Name	Binomial	Subspecies	Status
Chital තිත් මුවා	Axis axis	Sri Lankan axis deer, Axis axis ceylonensis	Least concern
Indian hog deer විල් මුවා	Axis porcinus	Axis porcinus porcinus	Endangered; possibly introduced
Gaur ගවරා	Bos gaurus		Extirpated
Wild water buffalo කුළු මීහරකා	Bubalus arnee	Bubalus arnee migona	Endangered
Sri Lankan yellow-striped chevrotain ශ්‍රී ලංකා කහ ඉරි මීමින්නා	Moschiola kathygre		Least concern
Sri Lankan spotted chevrotain ශ්‍රී ලංකා සුදු තිත් මීමින්නා	Moschiola meminna		Least concern
Indian muntjac ඕලු මුවා / වැලි මුවා	Muntiacus muntjak	Muntiacus muntjak malabaricus	Least concern
Sambar deer ගෝනා	Rusa unicolor	Sri Lankan sambar deer, Rusa unicolor unicolor	Vulnerable
Wild boar වල් ඌරා	Sus scrofa	Indian boar, Sus scrofa cristatus	Least concern

== See also ==
- Wildlife of Sri Lanka
- List of chordate orders
- Lists of mammals by region
- Mammal classification
