= List of mammals of Telangana =

This list includes the mammal species found in the Indian state of Telangana. There are 62 mammal species in Telangana.

== Artiodactyla ==
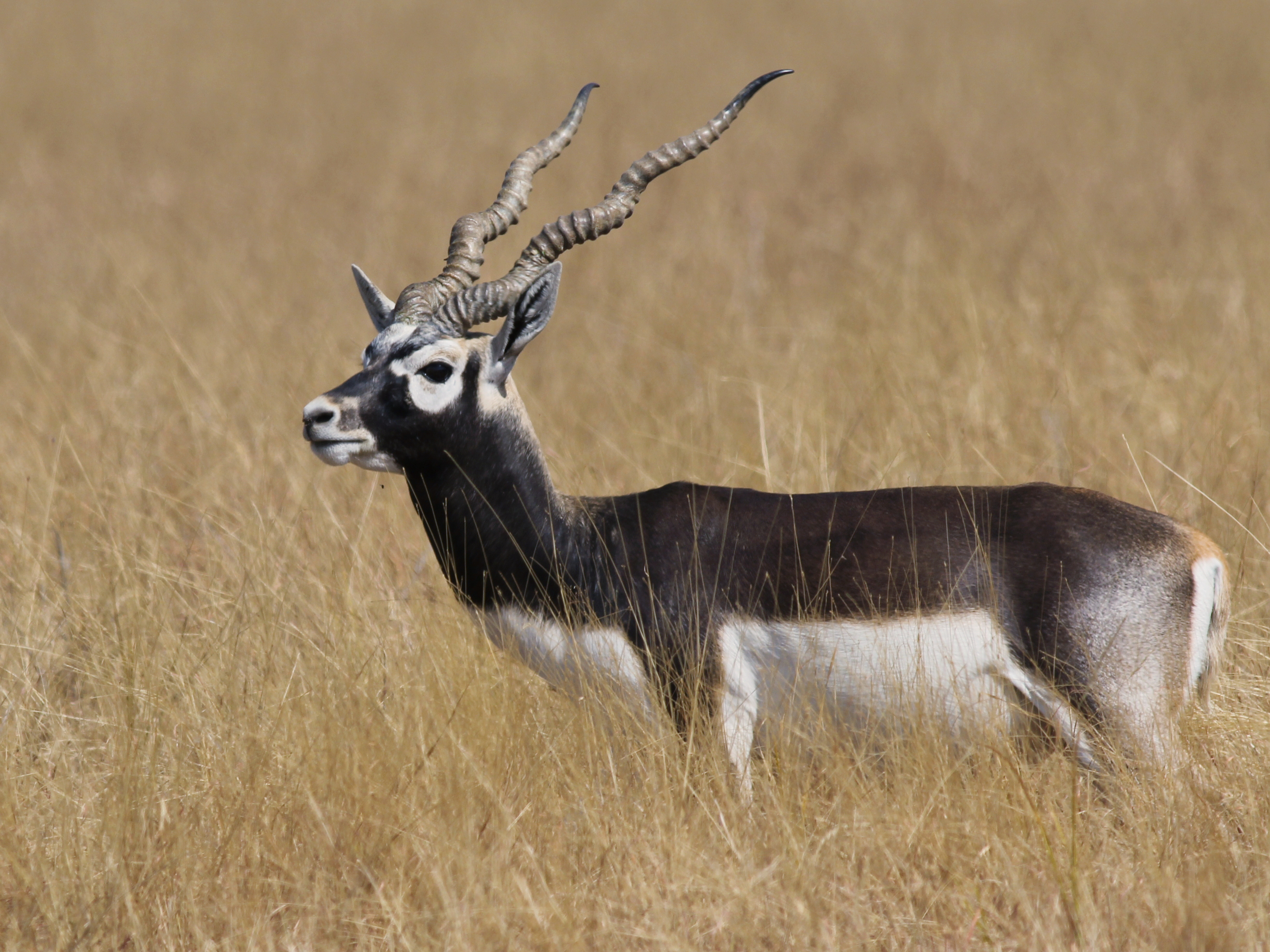
Blackbuck

- Blackbuck, Antilope cervicapra
- Chital, Axis axis
- Gaur, Bos gaurus
- Zebu, Bos indicus
- Domestic cow, Bos taurus
- Nilgai, Boselaphus tragocamelus
- Domestic water buffalo, Bubalus bubalis
- Dromedary camel, Camelus dromedarius
- Domestic goat, Capra hircus
- Chinkara, Gazella bennettii
- Indian spotted chevrotain, Moschiola indica
- Northern red muntjac, Muntiacus vaginalis
- Sambar, Rusa unicolor
- Wild boar, Sus sucrofa
- Four-horned antelope, Tetracerus quadricornis

== Carnivora ==
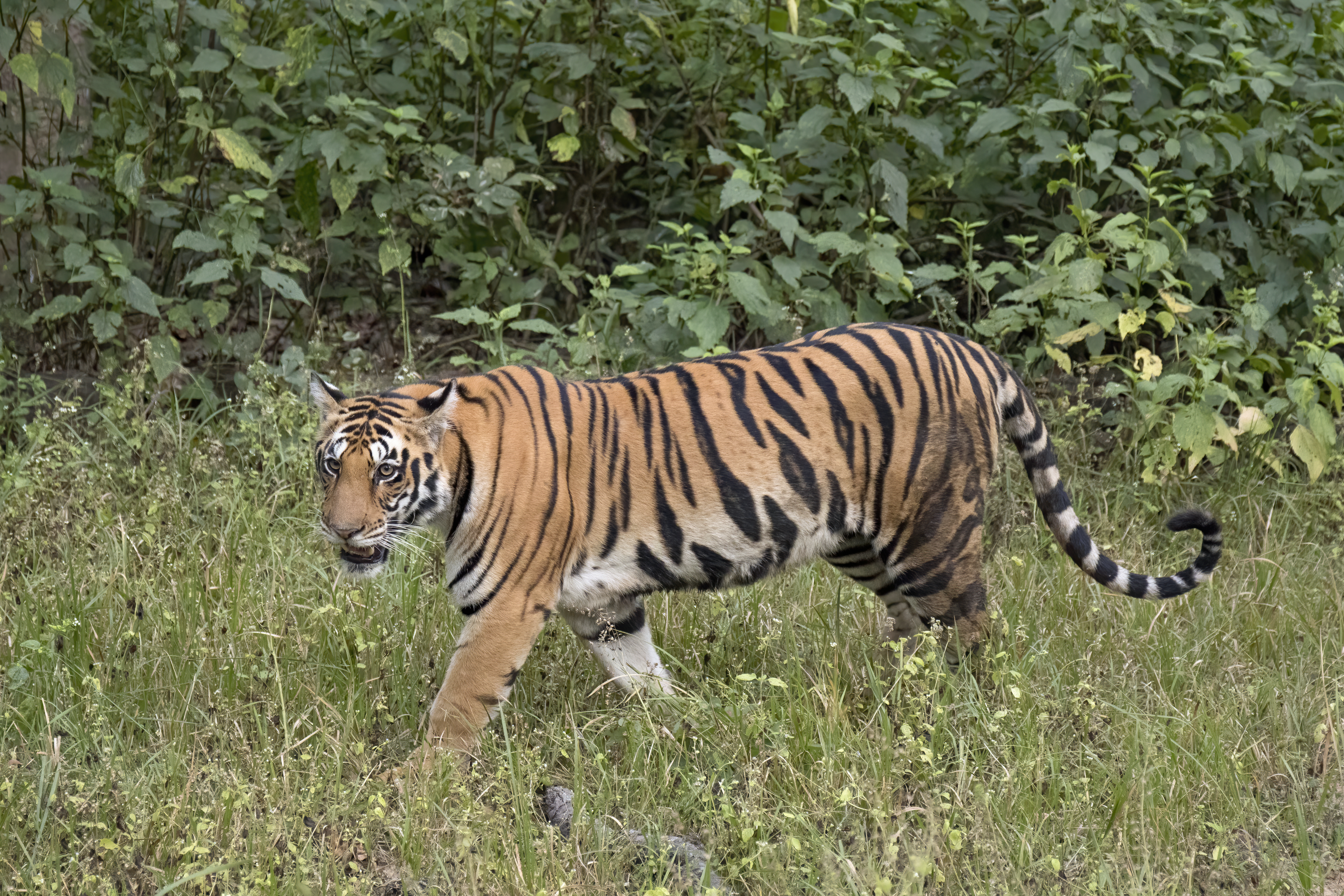
Tiger

- Golden jackal, Canis aureus
- Domestic dog, Canis familiaris
- Dhole, Cuon alpinus
- Domestic cat, Felis catus
- Jungle cat, Felis chaus
- Sloth bear, Melursus ursinus
- Leopard, Panthera pardus
- Tiger, Panthera tigris
- Asian palm civet, Paradoxurus hermaphroditus
- Indian grey mongoose, Urva edwarsii
- Ruddy mongoose, Urva smithii
- Bengal fox, Vulpes bengalensis

== Chiroptera ==
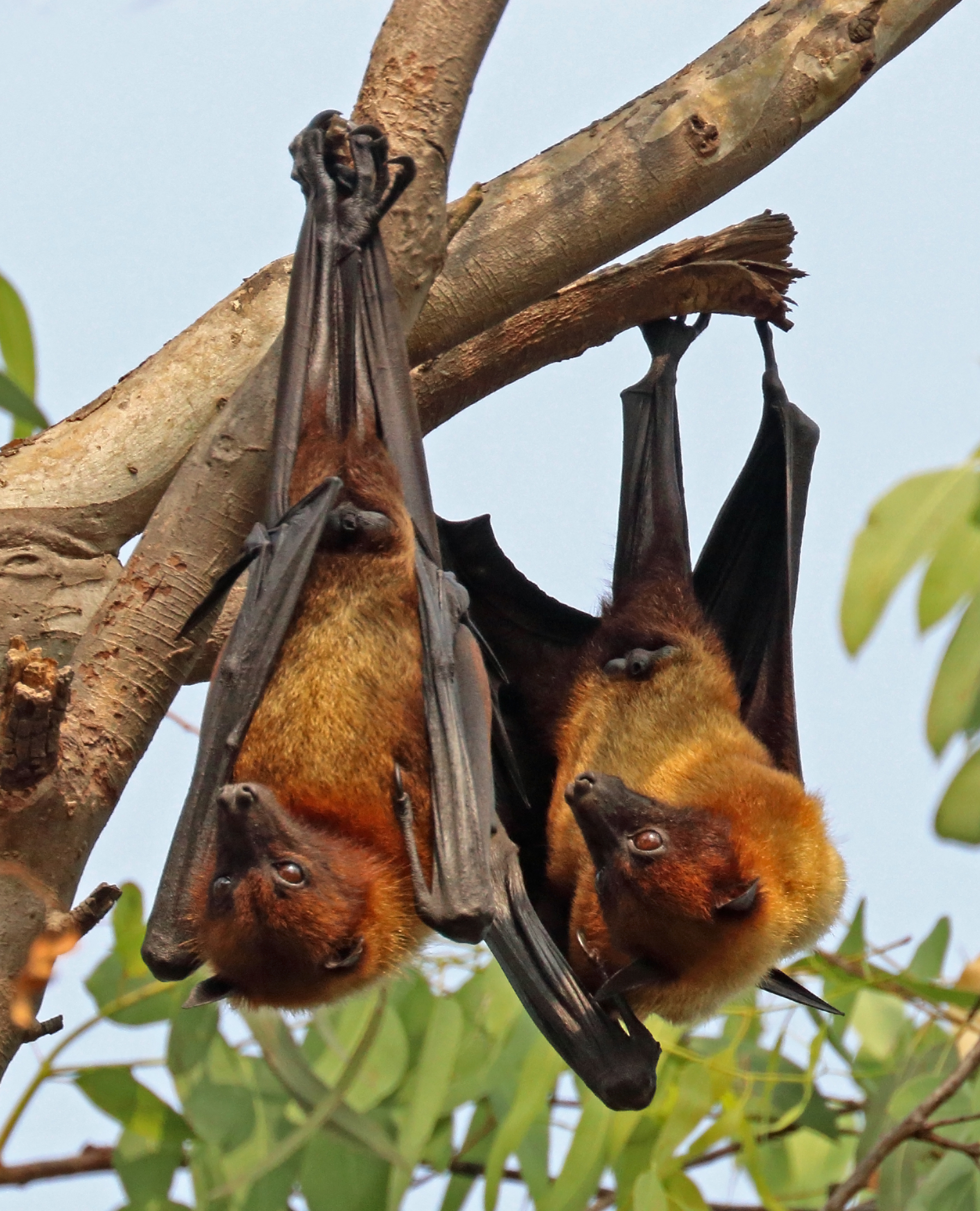
Indian flying fox

- Greater short-nosed fruit bat, Cynopterus sphinx
- Fulvus roundleaf bat, Hipposideros fulvus
- Indian roundleaf bat, Hipposideros lankadiva
- Schneider's leaf-nosed bat, Hipposideros speoris
- Greater false vampire bat, Lyroderma lyra
- Wrinkle-lipped free-tailed bat, Mops plicatus
- Round-eared tube-nosed bat, Murina cyclotis
- Kelaart's pipistrelle, Pipistrellus ceylonicus
- Indian flying fox, Pteropus giganteus
- Lesser woolly horseshoe bat, Rhinolophus beddomei
- Lesser mouse-tailed bat, Rhinopoma hardwickii
- Leschenault's rousette, Rousettus leschenaultii
- Lesser Asiatic yellow bat, Scotophilus kuhlii
- Egyptian free-tailed bat, Tadarida aegyptiaca
- Black-bearded tomb bat, Taphozous melanopogon
- Naked-rumped tomb bat, Taphozous nudiventris

== Eulipotyphla ==
- Asian house shrew, Suncus murinus

== Lagomorpha ==
- Indian hare, Lepus nigricollis

== Primates ==
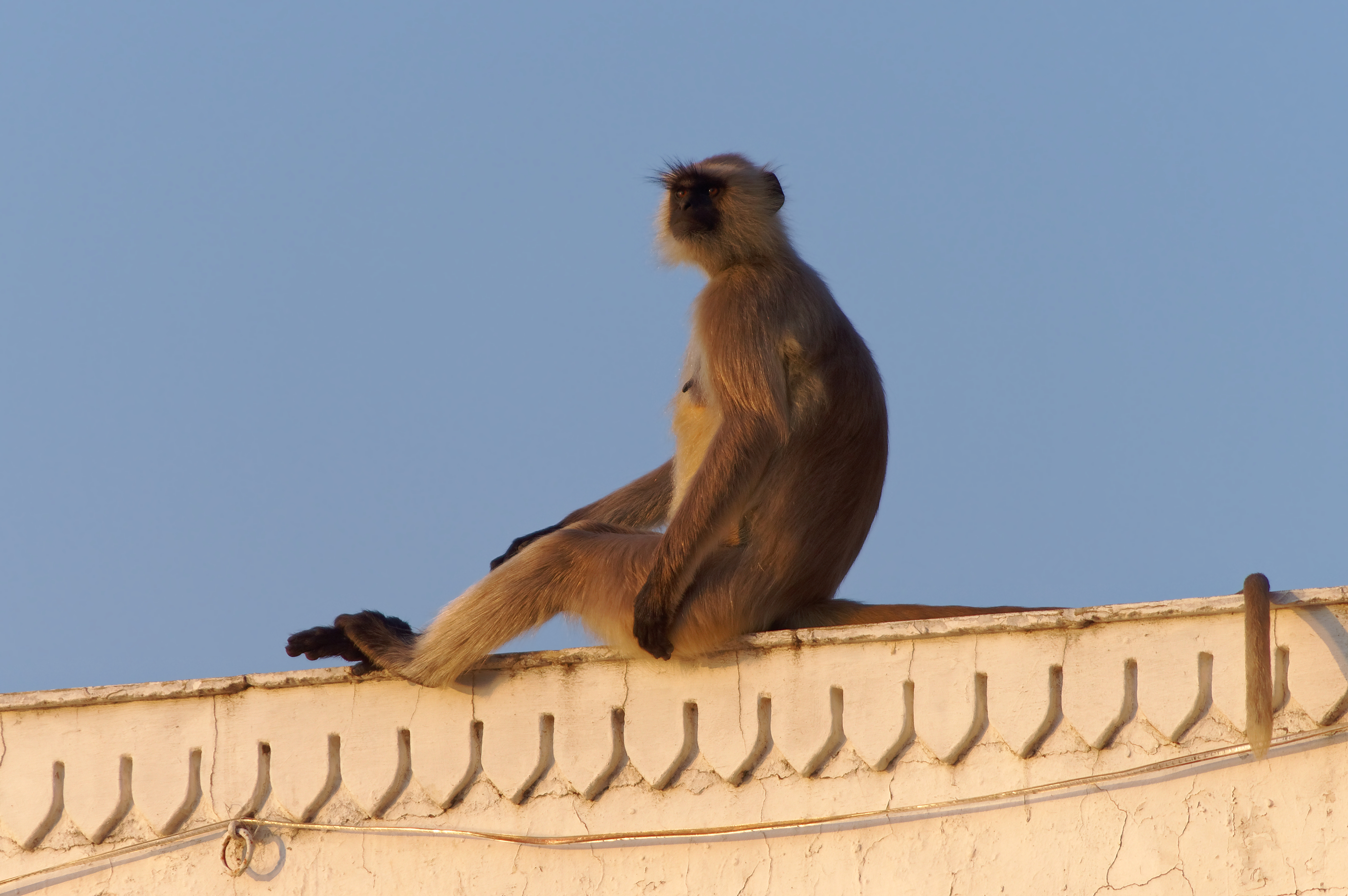
Northern plains gray langur

- Rhesus macaque, Macaca mulatta
- Bonnet macaque, Macaca radiata
- Northern plains gray langur, Semnopithecus entellus
- Tufted gray langur, Semnopithecus priam

== Rodentia ==
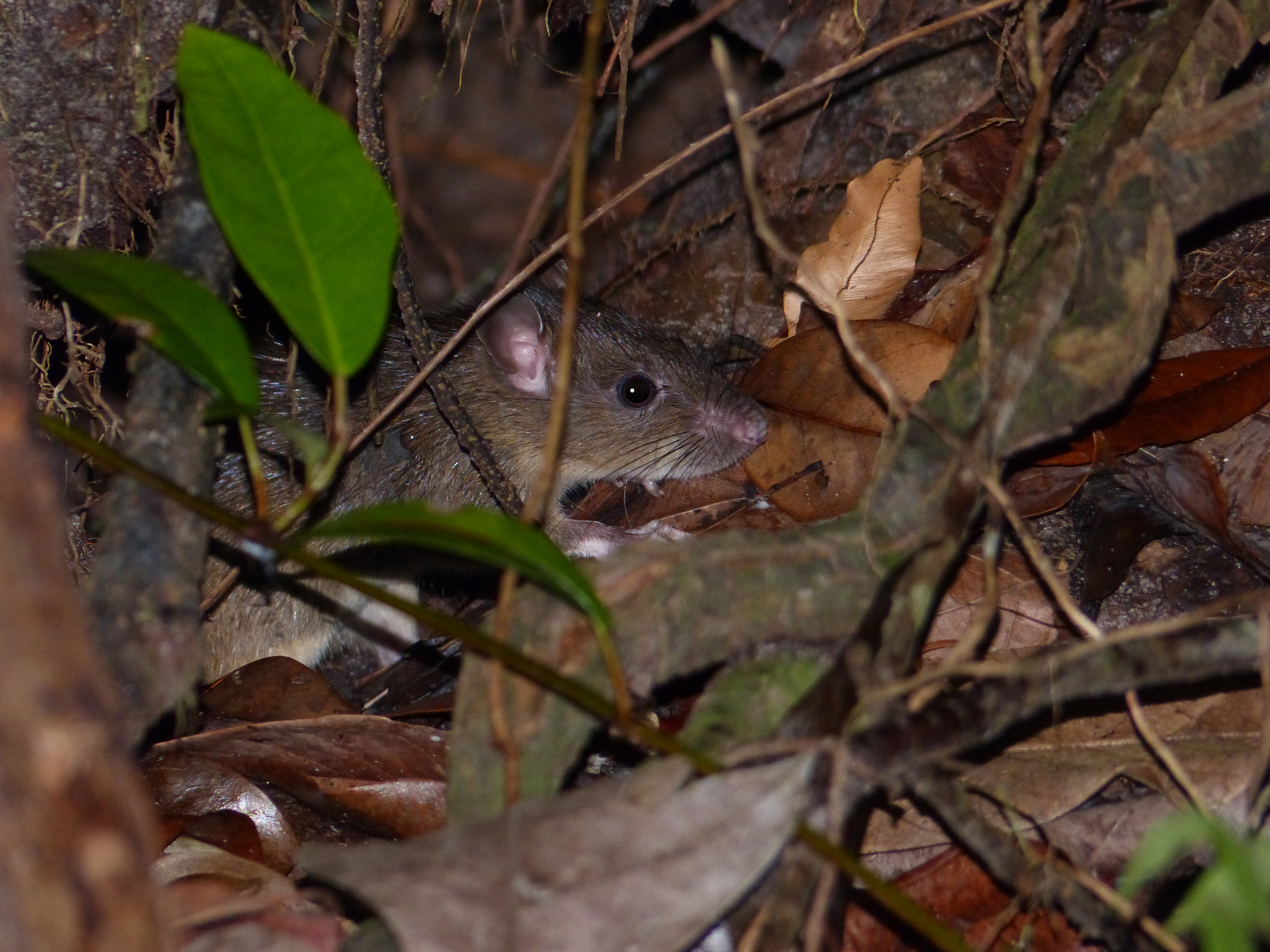
Black rat

- Lesser bandicoot rat, Bandicota bengalensis
- Cutch rat, Cremnomys cutchicus
- Northern palm squirrel, Funambulus pennantii
- Indian palm squirrel, Funambulus palmarum
- Indian crested porcupine, Hystrix indica
- House mouse, Mus musculus
- Phillips's mouse, Mus phillipsi
- Rock-loving mouse, Mus saxicola
- Earth-colored mouse, Mus terricolor
- Brown rat, Rattus norvegicus
- Black rat, Rattus rattus
- Indian giant squirrel, Ratufa indica

== Scandentia ==
- Madras treeshrew, Anathana ellioti
