= Mus dumbara =

Dumbara valley spiny mouse

Scientific classification
- Kingdom: Animalia
- Phylum: Chordata
- Class: Mammalia
- Order: Rodentia
- Family: Muridae
- Genus: Mus
- Subgenus: Pyromys
- Species: M. dumbara

Binomial name
- Mus dumbara Bahir, Meegaskumbura, and Boyagoda, 2026

Species of mouse

The Dumbara valley spiny mouse (Mus dumbara), also known as ඩුඹර කතු හේන් මේය (IPA: [ɖuᵁmbrə kətu heːnə meːjə]) in Sinhala, is a species of rodent in the Muridae family. It was first discovered in 2003–2005 and then confirmed to be its own species in 2026. It is endemic to Sri Lanka.

== Description ==
M. dumbara is a medium-sized mouse identifiable by its long tail, longer than its combined head and body length, and moderately prominent supraorbital ridge. It has greyish-brown spiny guard hairs mixed with brown and white finer hairs, and pinkish feet covered in fine white hair. It can be distinguished from all other Sri Lankan Mus pyromys by its longer tail, and the Ceylon spiny mouse also has a smaller skull.

== Range ==
The Dumbara spiny mouse is found exclusively near Puwakpitiya, Sri Lanka, in the valleys of northern Knuckles (Dumbara) Mountain Range.
