= Dusky palm squirrel =

Dusky palm squirrel is a common name applied to two rodents that were formerly considered to be a single species.

- Funambulus obscurus, native to Sri Lanka
- Funambulus sublineatus, or the Nilgiri striped squirrel, native to India
