= Mus (Pyromys) =

Scientific classification
- Kingdom: Animalia
- Phylum: Chordata
- Class: Mammalia
- Order: Rodentia
- Family: Muridae
- Genus: Mus
- Subgenus: Pyromys; Thomas, 1911

Subgenus of rodents

Pyromys is a subgenus of Mus. Species are endemic to South Asia and parts of Southeast Asia.

== Species ==
There are currently six species that have been discovered. They are listed below:

- Dumbara valley spiny mouse, Mus dumbara (Dumbara mountain range, Sri Lanka)
- Ceylon spiny mouse, Mus fernandoni (Sri Lanka)
- Phillips's mouse, Mus phillipsi (Southwestern India)
- Flat-haired mouse, Mus platythrix (India)
- Rock-loving mouse, Mus saxicola (Southern Pakistan, southern Nepal, and India)
- Shortridge's mouse, Mus shortridgei (Myanmar to southwestern Cambodia and northwestern Vietnam)
