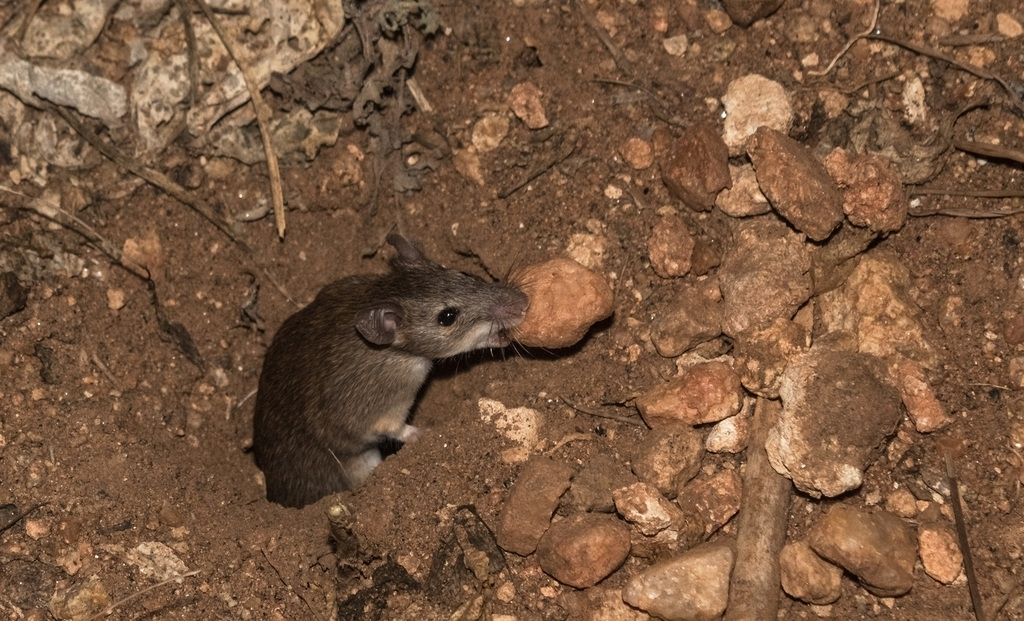
- Mouse picking stones

Conservation status
- Least Concern (IUCN 3.1)

Scientific classification
- Kingdom: Animalia
- Phylum: Chordata
- Class: Mammalia
- Order: Rodentia
- Family: Muridae
- Genus: Mus
- Subgenus: Pyromys
- Species: M. platythrix

Binomial name
- Mus platythrix Bennett, 1832

= Mus platythrix =

Species of rodent

Mus platythrix, the flat-haired mouse or Indian brown spiny mouse, is a species of rodent in the family Muridae. It is found only in India, where it is widely distributed throughout South India and central India.

== Behavior ==
The 'kall-eli (Tamil: கல் எலி, lit. "stone rat"), a local name in southern India, has been noted for arranging pebbles around its burrow entrances, and also in the bed and brood chambers of its burrows. This behavior may help deter predators and stabilize the burrow's microclimate, with some chambers lined with stones that appear to serve as bedding.
