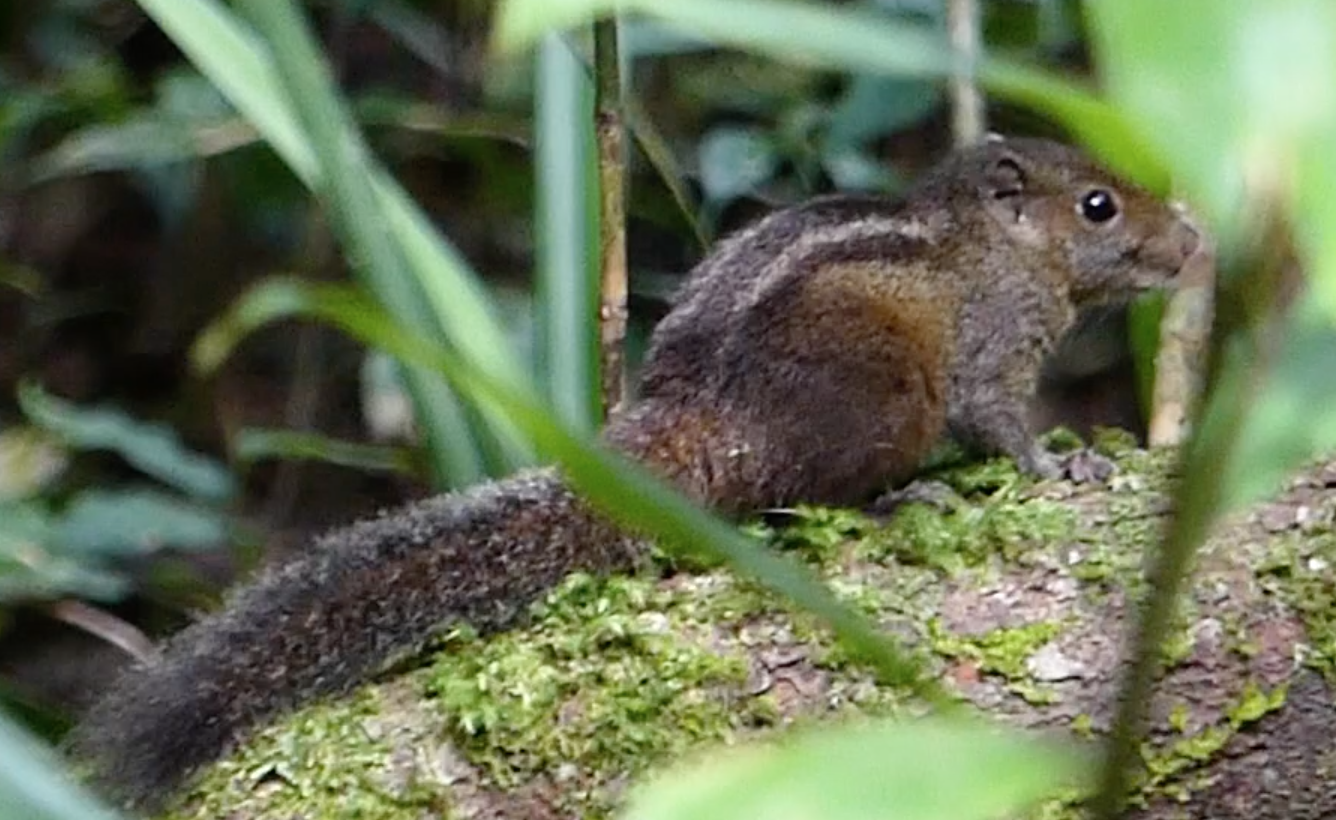

Scientific classification
- Kingdom: Animalia
- Phylum: Chordata
- Class: Mammalia
- Infraclass: Placentalia
- Order: Rodentia
- Family: Sciuridae
- Genus: Funambulus
- Species: F. obscurus

Binomial name
- Funambulus obscurus (Pelzen & Kohl, 1886)
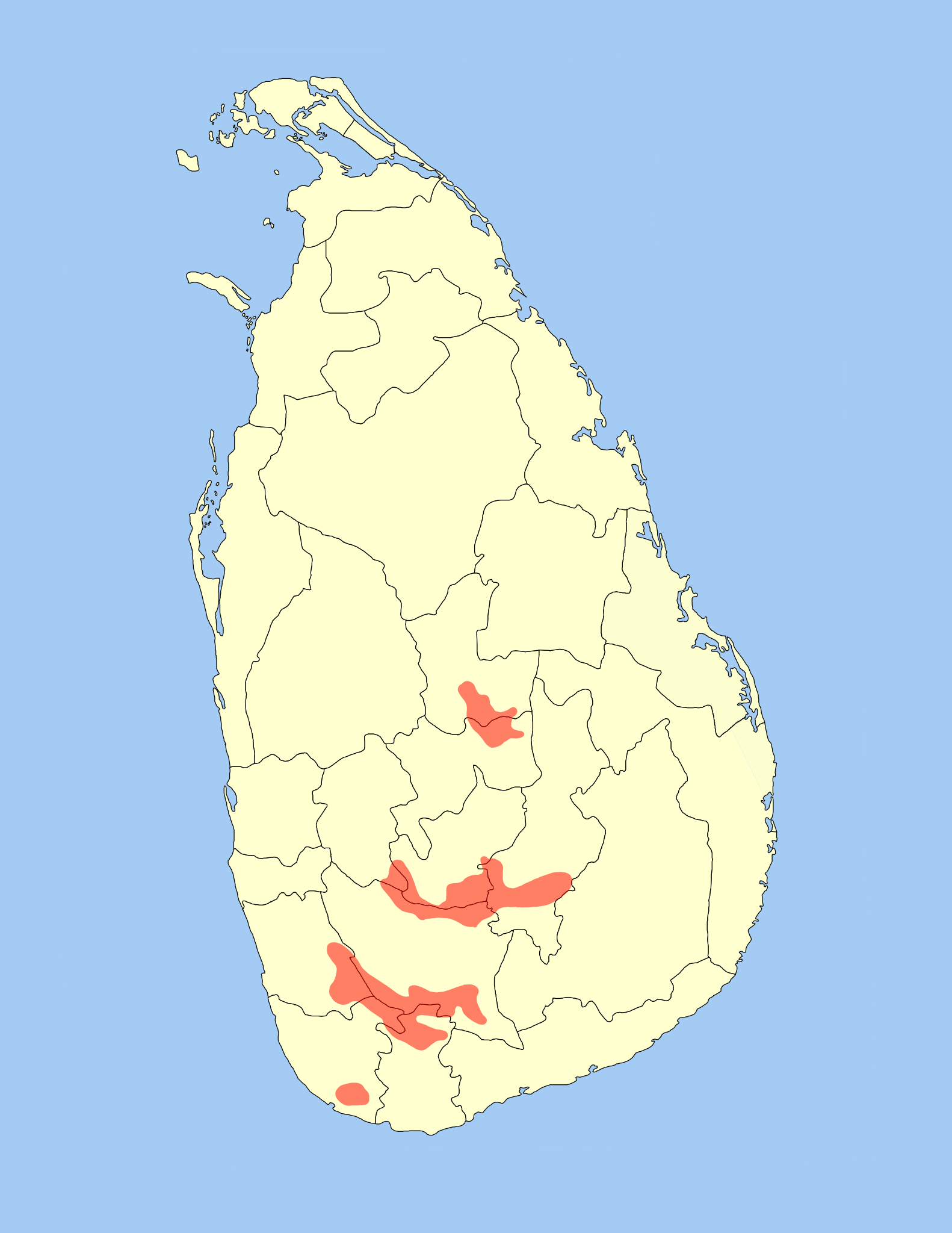

= Dusky striped squirrel =

Species of rodent

The dusky striped squirrel (Funambulus obscurus) is a species of small squirrel from Sri Lanka that is largely confined to rainforests in the southwestern "wet zone" with higher rainfall than the rest of the island. It was formerly regarded as a subspecies of Funambulus sublineatus from India, at which point the English name of the "combined species" also was dusky striped squirrel. It is known as පුංචි ලේනා (punchi lena) or "batu lena" in the Sinhala language.

== Taxonomy ==
The species was split off from Funambulus sublineatus, a similar Indian species in 2012. The Indian form (formerly subspecies F. s. sublineatus) is now referred to as the Nilgiri striped squirrel, whereas the Sri Lankan form (formerly F. s. obscurus) is now assigned the later designation Dusky striped squirrel.

The species was reasonably separated from its Indian counterpart by Kathleen Ryley in the Journal of the Bombay Natural History Society in 1913, and this was reinforced by Oldfield Thomas who renamed the species Funambulus kathleenae in Ryley's honour given her choice of name of Funambulus trilineatus by Edward Frederick Kelaart was regarded as invalid. However, it was lumped back with the Indian form in 1918 given a resurgence in the subspecies concept. By this time, an older name "obscurus" for this taxon had been traced (Funambulus palmarum var obscura) from 1886 apparently invalidating Thomas's designation.

== Description ==
The dusky striped squirrel was best documented originally by W.W.A. Phillips in the Manual of the Mammals of Sri Lanka who identified it as the smallest Sri Lankan squirrel species. It is much larger than the Indian species (F. sublineatus) being 60-70g as opposed to around 42g in the Nilgiri striped squirrel, with longer, thicker stripes. Its head and body length is 11–13 cm, with a 10-cm tail. Its upperparts are dark or olive brown to black in colour with three paler dorsal stripes against the dorsal, saddle colouration; its underparts are yellowish with an olivaceous tinge. The tail is bushy, short with a black tip. Fur is soft, dense and short. Parts without fur are grayish. The characteristic features that distinguish this squirrel from other related Funambulus squirrels on the island is smaller size, darker coat, indistinct stripes, and its higher pitched, trilling bird-like voice. It would most easily be confused with Layard's squirrel.

== Distribution ==
Only found in Sri Lanka, this squirrel can be seen in wet zone low elevations to highlands with dense forest cover up to ~2400m or 8000 ft, being a squirrel that naturally occurs at the highest elevations where frost can occur compared to other Sri Lankan squirrels. Sinharaja rain forest, Horton Plains, and districts like Nuwara Eliya, Ratnapura and parts of Kandy are home to this squirrel.

== Ecology ==
A diurnal forest dweller, this species is sometimes found close to human dwellings or tea plantations at the edge of forests. Plants like Bamboo, Strobilanthes and Cardamom (Elettaria) are associated with them in forest or forest edge contexts. They are known to live in bamboo and though often observed close to the ground, will also forage on the tree tops, often associating in bird waves (mixed bird species feeding flocks). This is a highly alert and timid species, and just a snap of sound will cause them to hide within dense cover, sometimes making audible alarm calls. But they can become tame and can be observed in the field if the observer is silent.

== Diet ==
This squirrel is omnivorous feeding on small insects, grubs, shoots, seeds and fruits. They are fond of rice and fruit at food dumps in Buddhist monasteries and similar places close to suitable forest. The diet has not been studied adequately and it has been thought (largely based on Phillips) that this species tends to rely more on invertebrates based on its habits of often coming to the ground and examining logs in comparison to its congeners in Sri Lanka that are more naturally arboreal, Layard's squirrel and the Indian palm squirrel (although the latter does descend to the ground as an opportunistic garden species, in captivity, it is typically fed and seems to thrive on a vegetarian diet of starch, nuts and fruit).

== Communication ==
They have a bird-like voice, which can mistakenly thought to be a bird while only listening to the sound. The voice is a high pitched trill of rapid barks. There are alarm calls and mating calls like other squirrels, however, the general calls sound similar though it may be more explosive when venting alarm or a long drawn sustained barking from a favoured tree when making territorial calls for several minutes. When a predator is seen, it perches out of harm's way, sitting on its haunches at a safe distance. It alarm calls with a flick of its tail accompanying each call, just as the well known Funambulus palmarum does.
