= Shortridge's mouse =

Conservation status
- Least Concern (IUCN 3.1)

Scientific classification
- Kingdom: Animalia
- Phylum: Chordata
- Class: Mammalia
- Order: Rodentia
- Family: Muridae
- Genus: Mus
- Subgenus: Pyromys
- Species: M. shortridgei

Binomial name
- Mus shortridgei Thomas, 1914
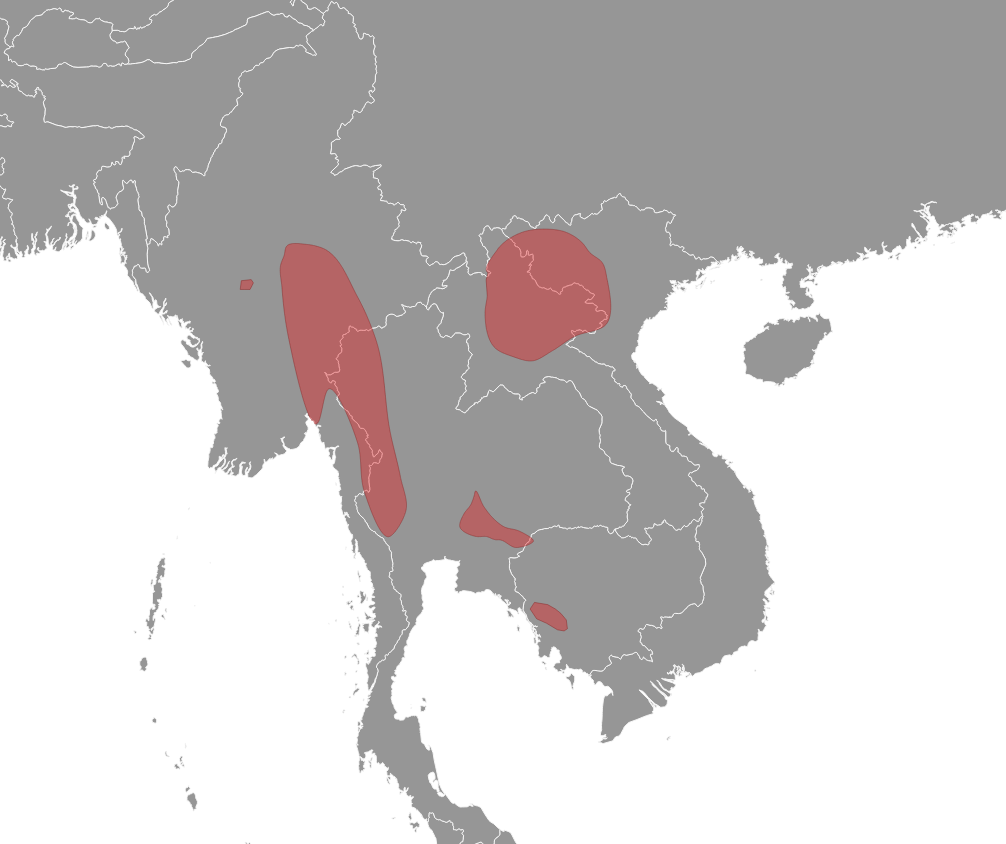

Species of rodent

Shortridge's mouse (Mus shortridgei) is a species of rodent in the family Muridae. It is found in Cambodia, Laos, Myanmar, Thailand, and Vietnam.
