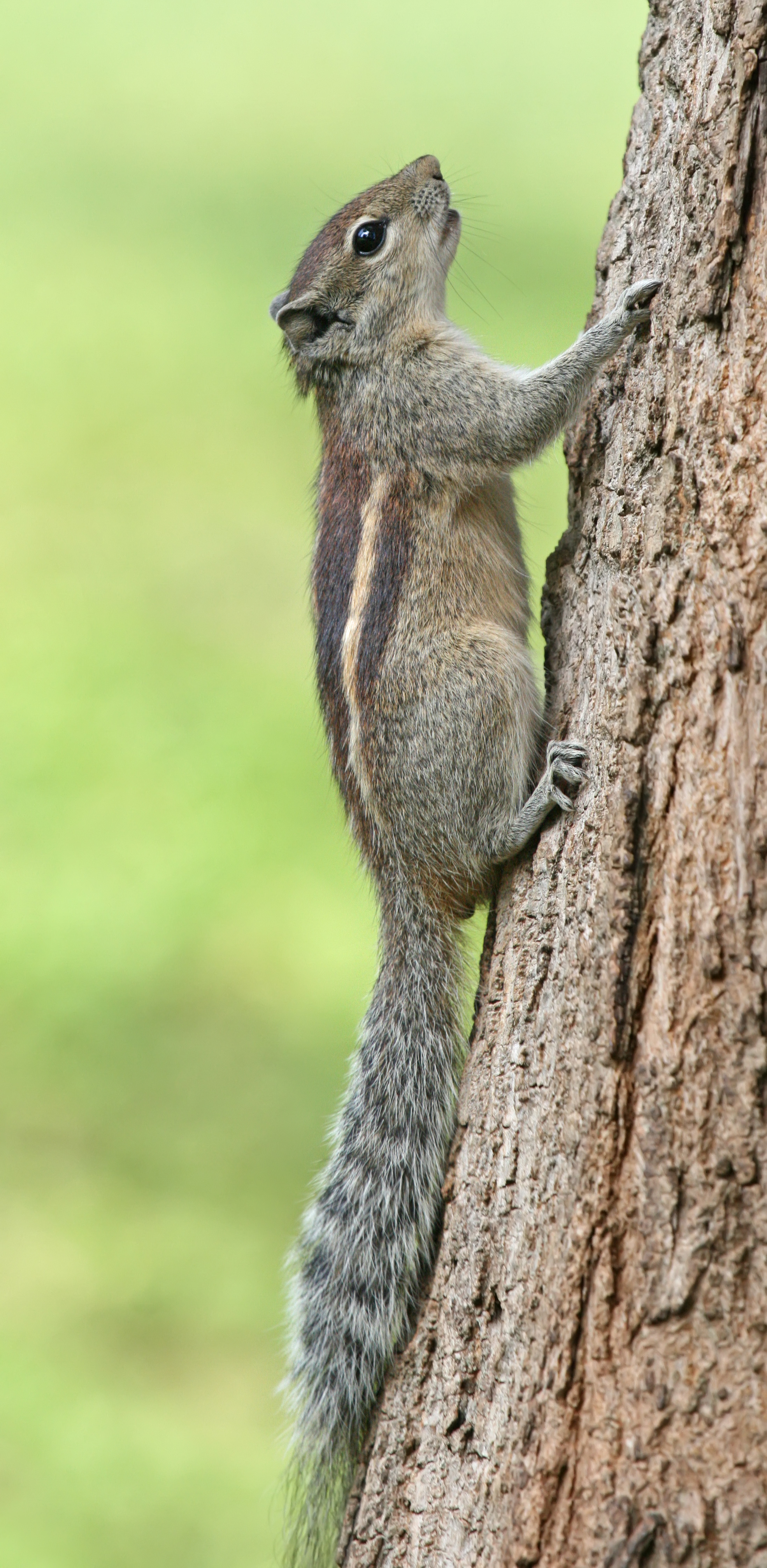
- Indian palm squirrel (Funambulus palmarum)

Scientific classification
- Kingdom: Animalia
- Phylum: Chordata
- Class: Mammalia
- Order: Rodentia
- Family: Sciuridae
- Subfamily: Callosciurinae
- Tribe: Funambulini; Pocock, 1923
- Genus: Funambulus; Lesson, 1835

Type species
- Sciurus indicus Lesson, 1835 (= Sciurus palmarum Linnaeus, 1776)

Species
- Funambulus layardi Funambulus palmarum Funambulus pennantii Funambulus sublineatus Funambulus obscurus Funambulus tristriatus

Synonyms
- Palmista J. E. Gray, 1867; Tamiodes Pocock, 1923

= Funambulus =

Genus of rodents

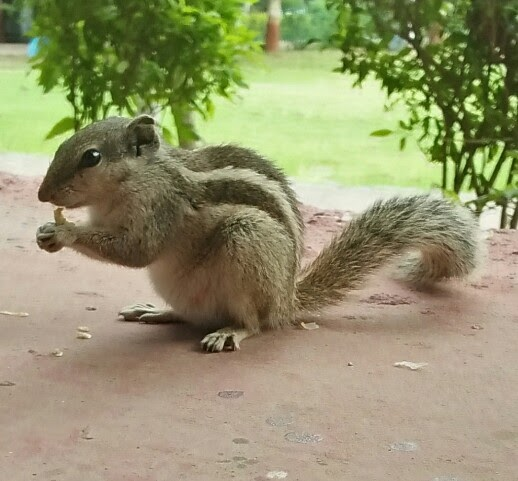
A squirrel apparently appearing to give a thumbs up but is actually eating maize grain.

Funambulus is a genus of rodents in the Sciuridae (squirrel) family, the only one in tribe Funambulini. It contains these species:

- Genus Funambulus
  - Subgenus Funambulus
    - Layard's palm squirrel (F. layardi) — Sri Lanka
    - Dusky palm squirrel (F. obscurus) — Sri Lanka
    - Indian palm squirrel (F. palmarum) — Indian Peninsula and Sri Lanka
    - Nilgiri striped palm squirrel (F. sublineatus) — southern Western Ghats
    - Jungle palm squirrel (F. tristriatus) — southern India, mostly Western Ghats
  - Subgenus Prasadsciurus
    - Northern palm squirrel (F. pennantii) — most of South Asia (but not the southernmost tip), stretching into the highlands of Pakistan and Iran

== Etymology ==
"Funambulus" is the Latin word for "rope-dancer".
