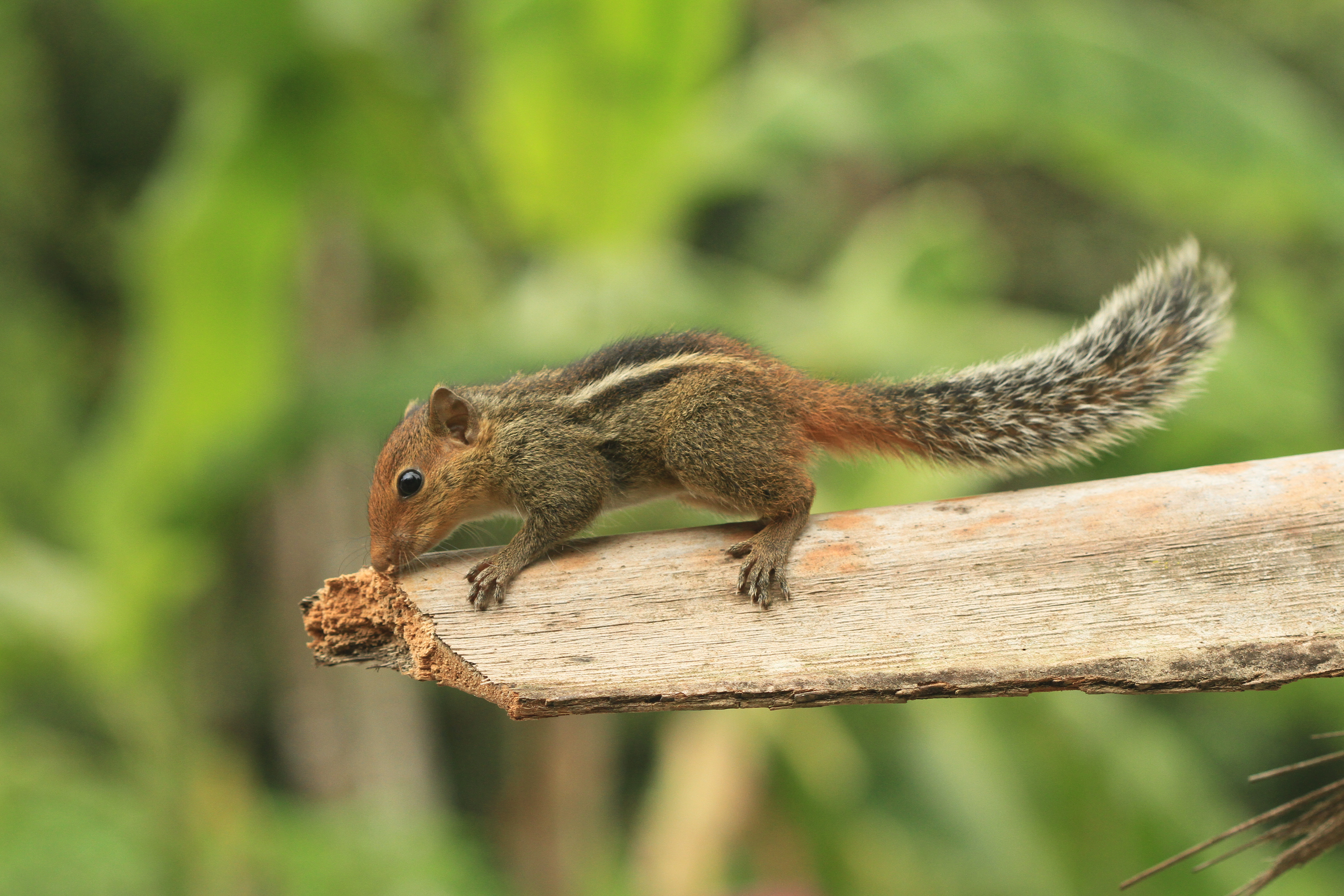

Conservation status
- Least Concern (IUCN 3.1)

Scientific classification
- Kingdom: Animalia
- Phylum: Chordata
- Class: Mammalia
- Infraclass: Placentalia
- Order: Rodentia
- Family: Sciuridae
- Genus: Funambulus
- Subgenus: Funambulus
- Species: F. tristriatus

Binomial name
- Funambulus tristriatus (Waterhouse, 1837)

Subspecies
- F. t. tristriatus; F. t. numarius

Audio

= Jungle palm squirrel =

Species of rodent

The jungle palm squirrel, jungle striped squirrel, or Western Ghats squirrel (Funambulus tristriatus) is a species of rodent in the family Sciuridae which is endemic to India.

== Habitat ==
Its natural habitats are subtropical or tropical dry forests, but it is tolerant to habitat changes and is also common in tea plantations in the Western Ghats. It is confined to forests with tall trees along the west coast of the Indian Peninsula. This confinement has led the jungle palm squirrel to be considered a pest on cacao, mangos, grapes, and sapota, plants that commonly grow in the type of forest.

== Sex ratio ==
The ratio between males and females is not split evenly; males have been reported to have a larger population share. Potential factors for the uneven sex ratio include differences in "rate of persistence, mortality, dispersal, and predation pressure".

== Gallery ==
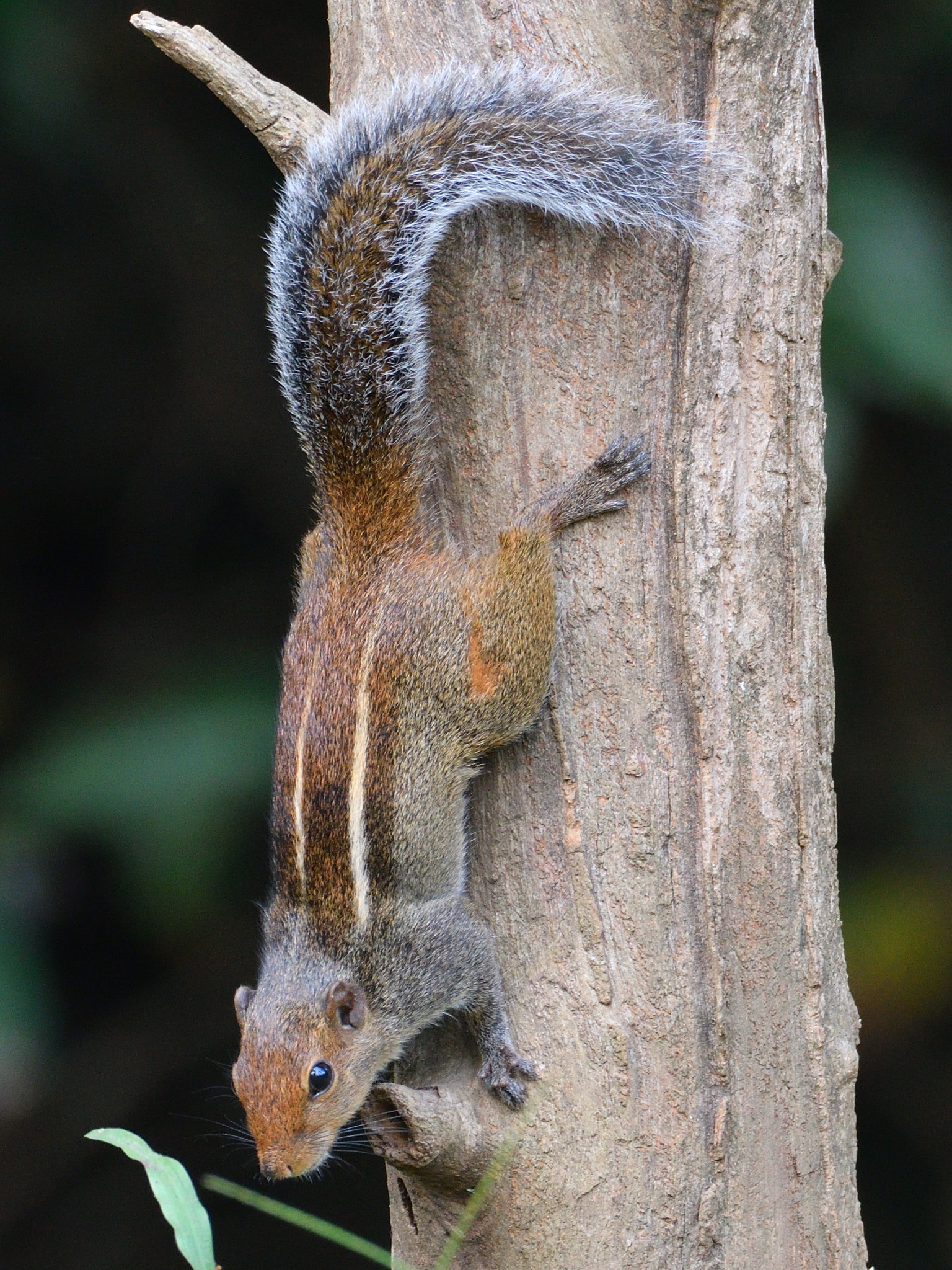
In Kerala, southern India

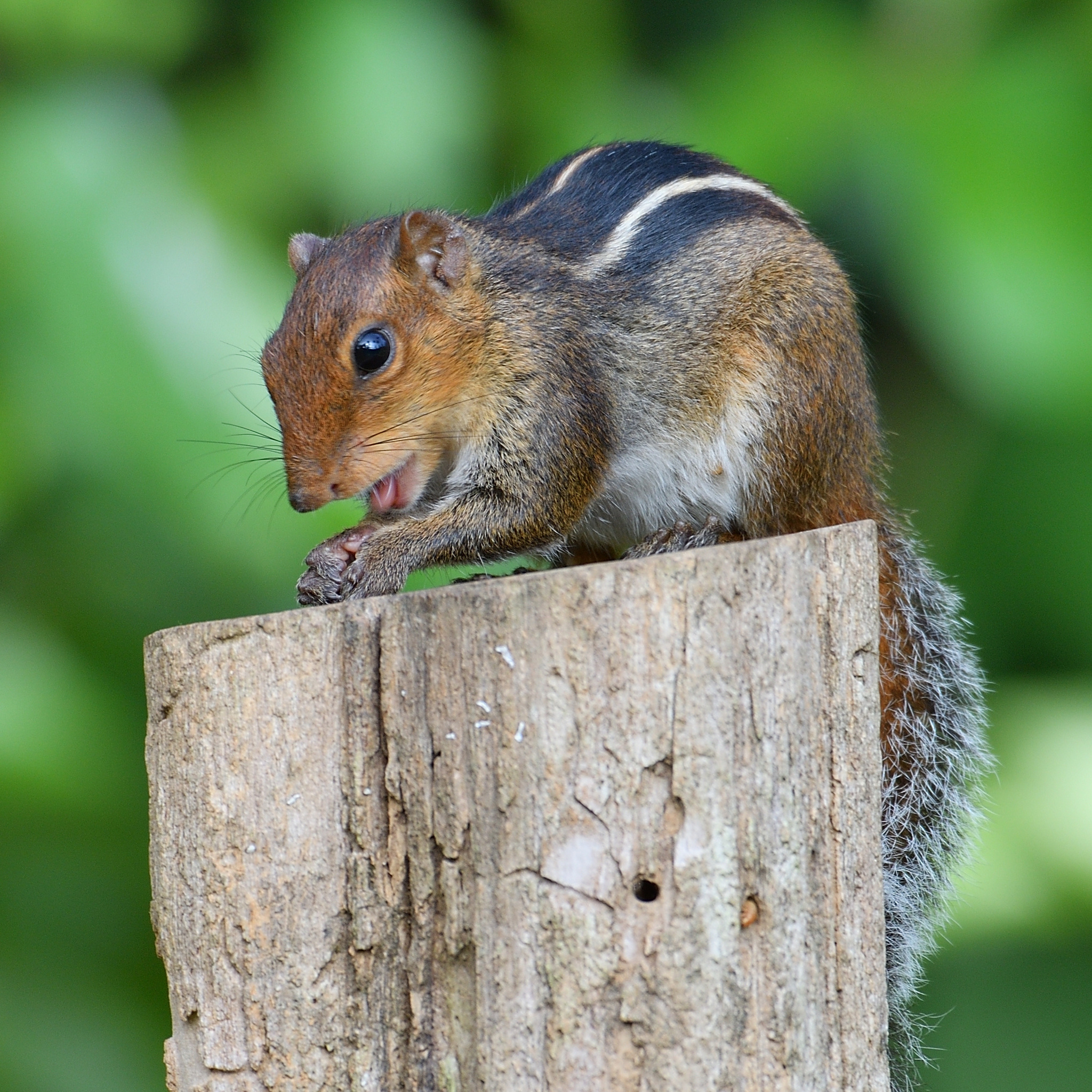
In Kerala, southern India

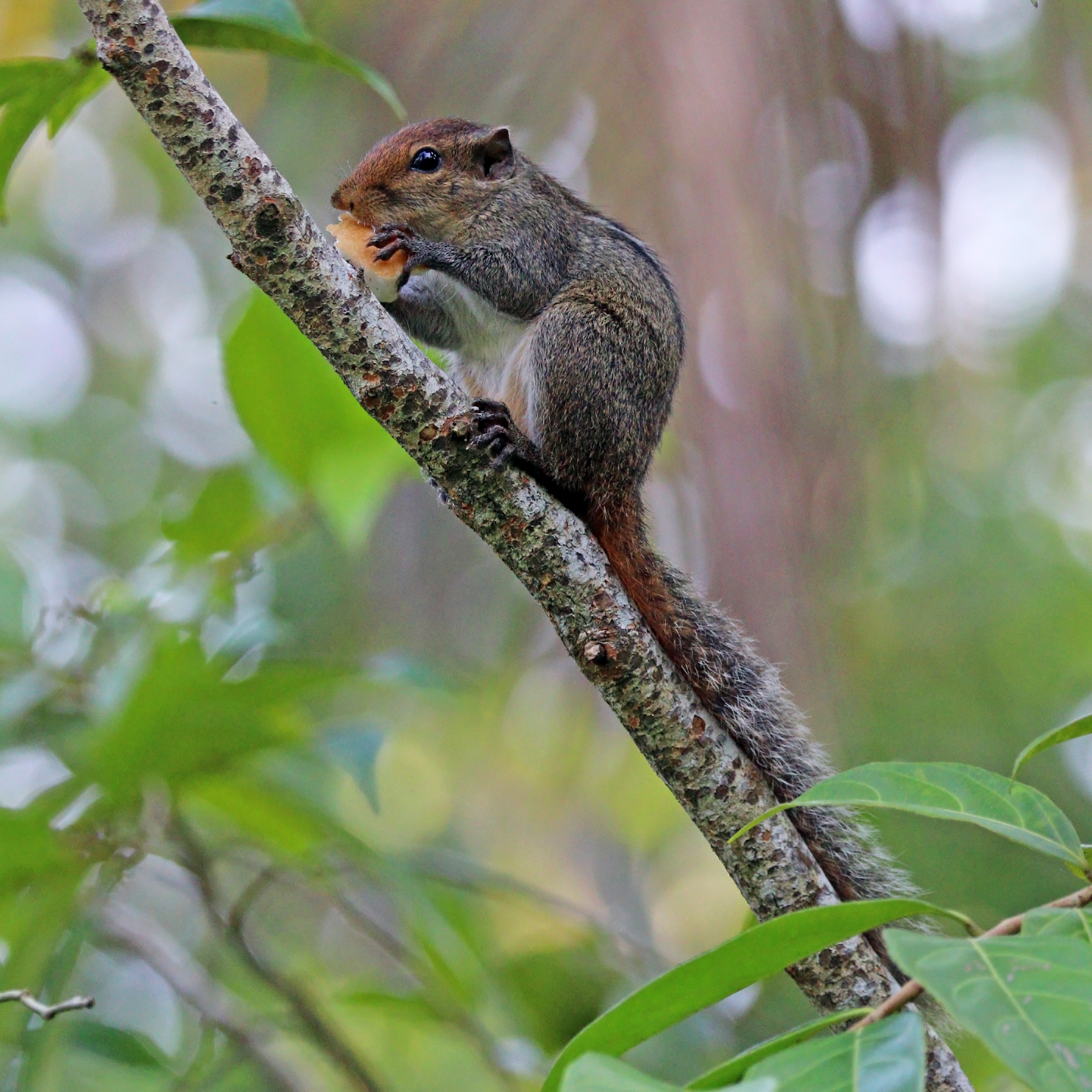
In Kerala, southern India

== Sources ==
- Advani, Ranjan; Sujatha, A. (1984). "Body weights, sex ratio and population structure of the Western ghat squirrel, Funamhulus tristriatus". Proceedings: Animal Sciences. 93 (5): 491–496. doi:10.1007/bf03186296. S2CID 129830888.
- Kumara, Honnavalli N.; Singh, Mewa (2006). "Distribution and relative abundance of giant squirrels and flying squirrels in Karnataka, India / Distribution et abondance relative des espèces d'écureuils géants et volants à Karnataka, Inde". Mammalia. 70 (1–2). doi:10.1515/mamm.70.1-2.40.
- Advani, Ranjan; Sujatha, A. (1984). "Body weights, sex ratio and population structure of the Western ghat squirrel, Funamhulus tristriatus". Proceedings: Animal Sciences. 93 (5): 491–496. doi:10.1007/BF03186296. S2CID 129830888.
- Chandrasekar-Rao, Anjali; Sunquist, Melvin E. (1996). "Ecology of small mammals in tropical forest habitats of southern India". Journal of Tropical Ecology. 12 (4): 561–571. doi:10.1017/S0266467400009779. S2CID 84801531.
