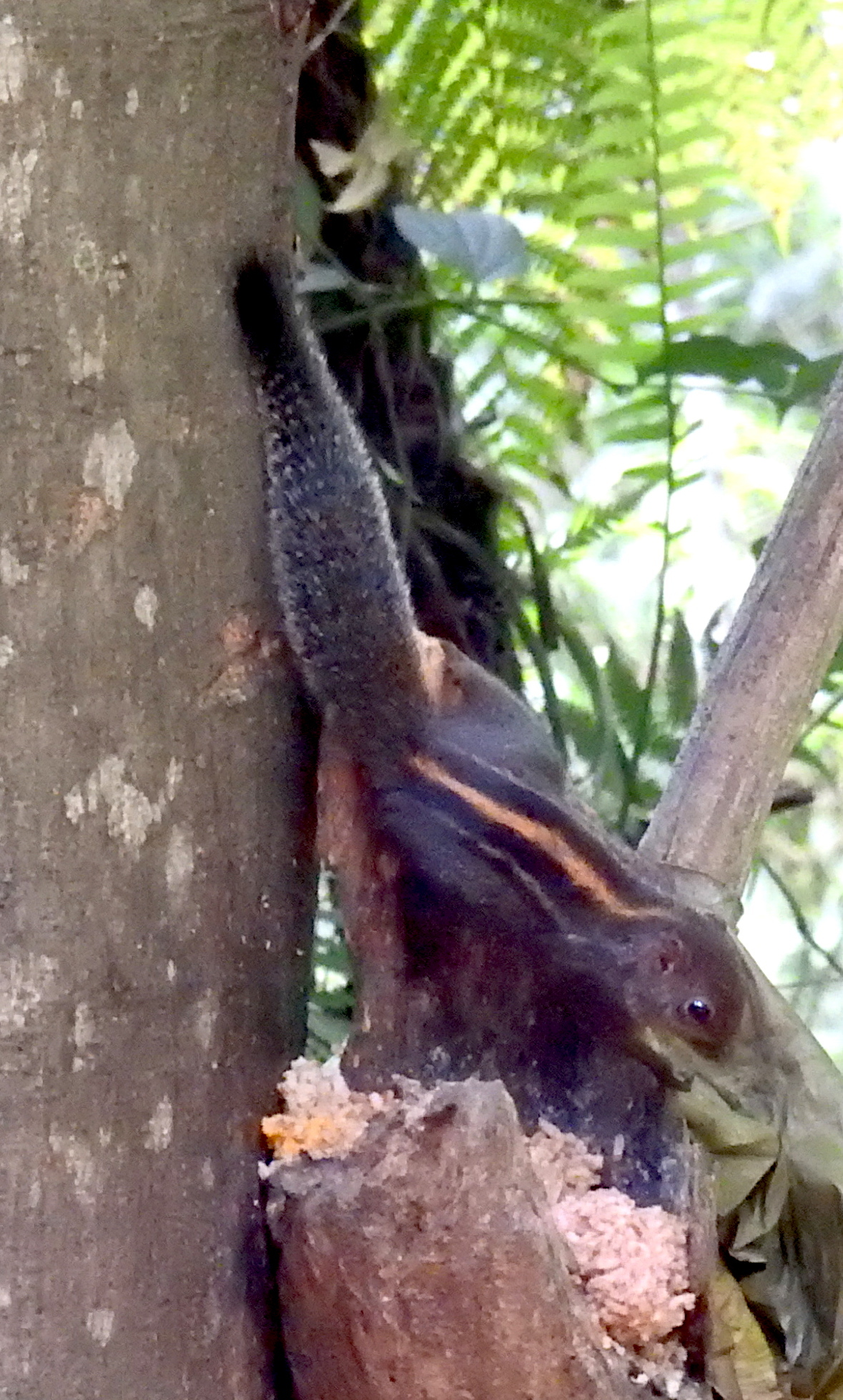

Conservation status
- Vulnerable (IUCN 3.1)

Scientific classification
- Kingdom: Animalia
- Phylum: Chordata
- Class: Mammalia
- Infraclass: Placentalia
- Order: Rodentia
- Family: Sciuridae
- Genus: Funambulus
- Species: F. layardi

Binomial name
- Funambulus layardi (Blyth, 1849)

Subspecies
- F. l. layardi; F. l. dravidianus (?); F. l. signatus
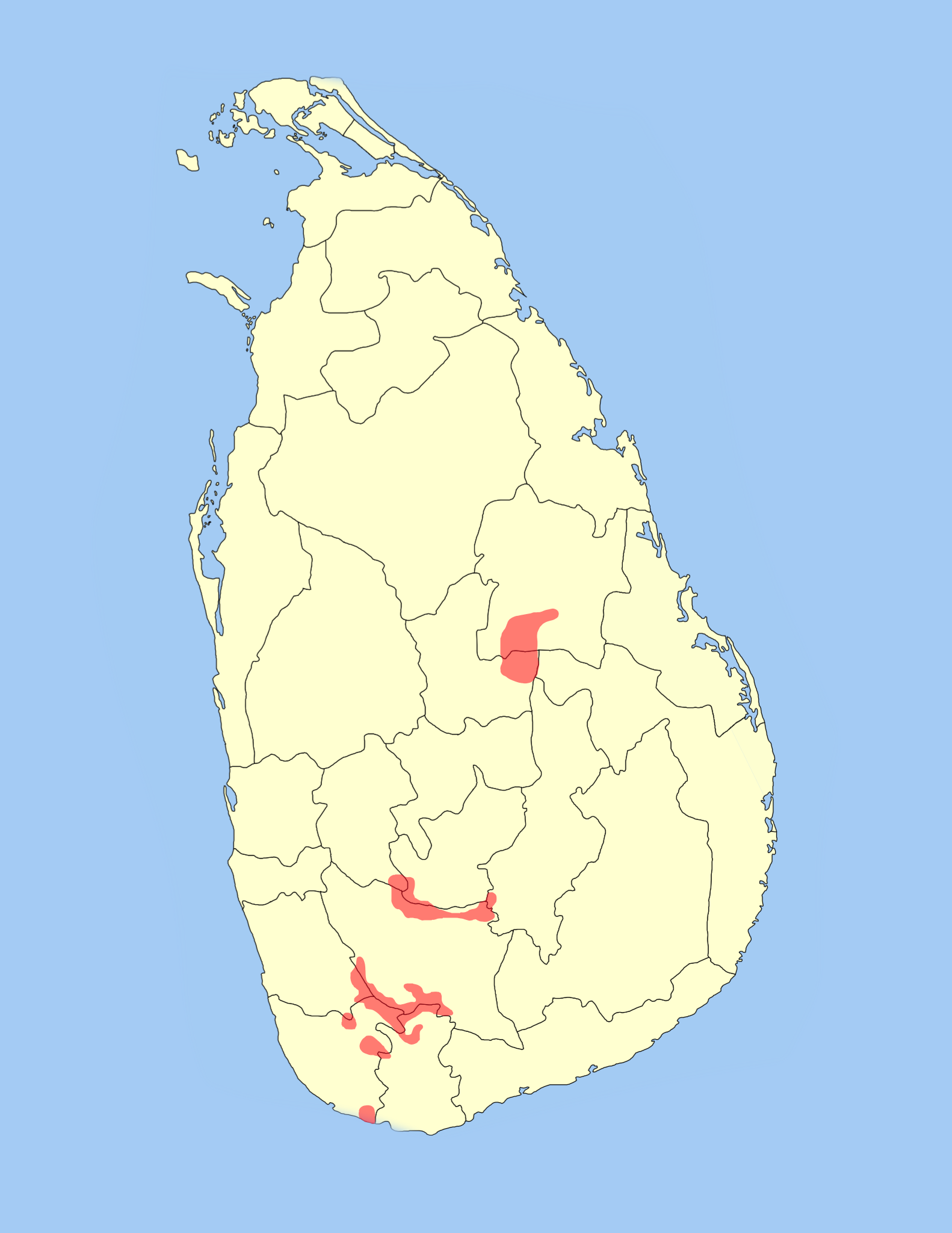
- Layard's palm squirrel Range Map

Synonyms
- Funambulus layardi Robinson, 1917; Sciurus layardi Blyth, 1849; Tamoides layardi Phillips, 1935 subsp. layardi Tamoides layardi Phillips, 1935 subsp. signatus

= Layard's palm squirrel =

Species of rodent

Layard's palm squirrel or flame-striped jungle squirrel (Funambulus layardi) is a species of rodent in the family Sciuridae endemic to Sri Lanka. The validity of the subspecies F. l. dravidianus based on a single specimen from the southern tip of India has been questioned, and is probably a juvenile F. sublineatus. Known as මූකලන් ලේනා (mukalan lena) in Sinhala.

== Distribution ==
It is endemic to the central highlands of Sri Lanka. Few observations are known out of central hills, such as from Trincomalee and Matara districts, but it remains unresolved. It can be seen in Knuckles mountain range and other high altitude ranges in western basin of the central hills.

== Description ==
Its head and body length is 12–17 cm, with a 14-cm tail. In color, it is blackish brown with three stripes on its dorsum; the central stripe is broadest and longest with an orange hue in F. signatus, yellow in F. layardi. Its underparts are reddish orange in color, and its snout is small. Tail bushy and blackish brown with some red in it. Some individuals also possess some grizzling appearance on it. Fur is soft, short and dense.

== Habitat and ecology ==
Its natural habitat is subtropical and tropical moist lowland forests or subtropical and tropical moist montane forests. It is threatened by habitat loss. It is a diurnal species as other squirrels of the genus and forage in full daytime. They are found on canopy level in forests, where they spend little time on ground. With night falls, they start to become noisy.

The main predators of this little creature are snakes, raptor birds, civets and small cats. Mongooses can be predators when they land on the ground floor.

== Diet ==
Unlike other squirrels, they are slightly omnivores that eat fruits, young shoots, nuts and also insects when herbivore diets scarce.

== Reproduction ==
They live as a pair until death, so pair-bonding is high. About 3 offspring are produced per time within a nest made by grass, leaves and fiber plant parts in forest canopy. Breeding season is change with the rainy seasons.

== Conservation ==
They are protected under the law and strictly prohibited of catching and hunting. But logging, and habitat destruction are the major threats for their lives. The population is declining in each year.
