= Phillips's mouse =

Conservation status
- Least Concern (IUCN 3.1)

Scientific classification
- Kingdom: Animalia
- Phylum: Chordata
- Class: Mammalia
- Order: Rodentia
- Family: Muridae
- Genus: Mus
- Subgenus: Pyromys
- Species: M. phillipsi

Binomial name
- Mus phillipsi Wroughton, 1912

Species of rodent

Phillips's mouse (Mus phillipsi) is a species of rodent in the family Muridae. It is found only in India. Its natural habitats are subtropical or tropical dry forests, subtropical or tropical dry lowland grassland, and hot deserts. It is threatened by habitat loss.
