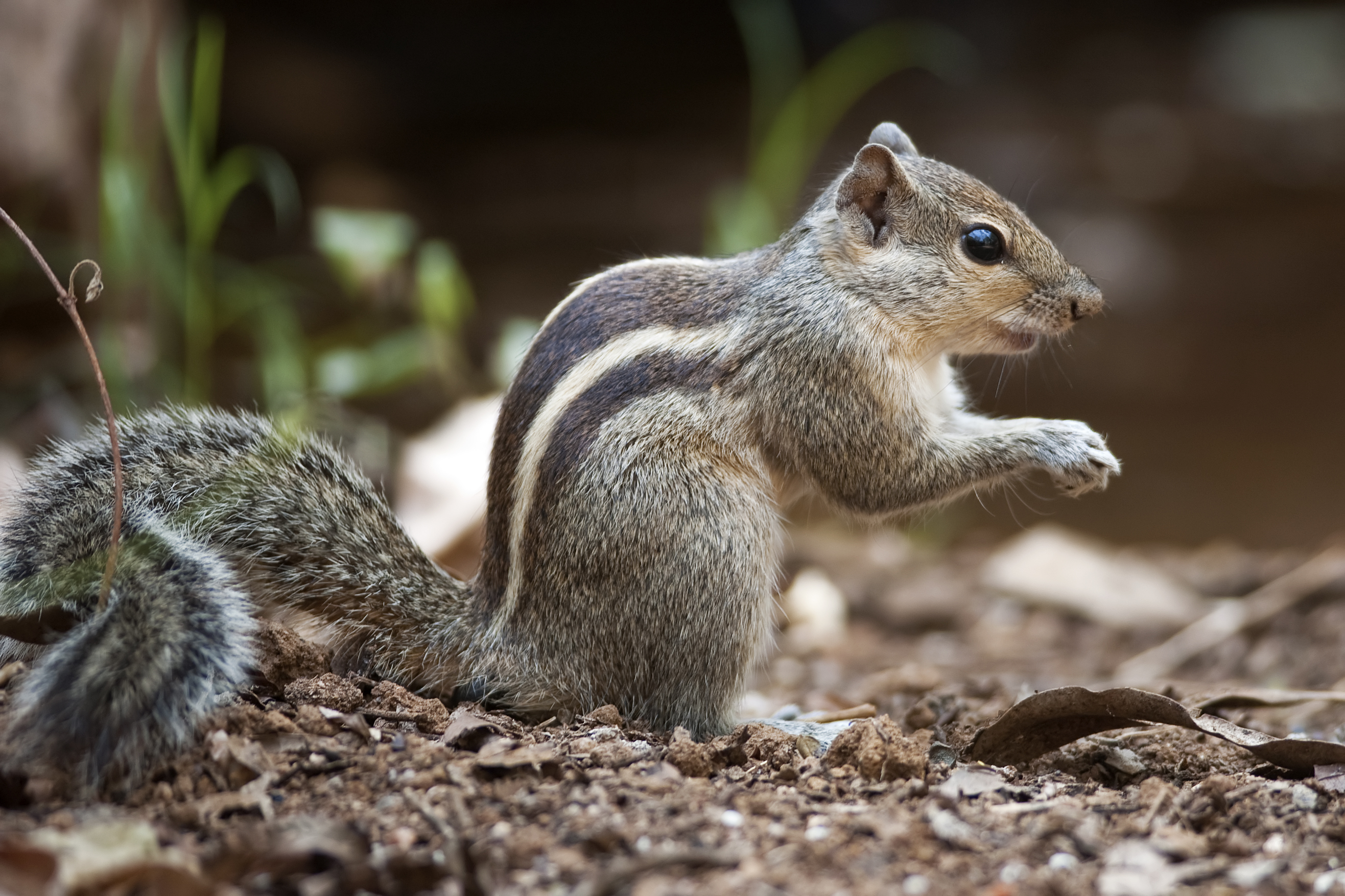
- Image from Bangalore

Conservation status
- Least Concern (IUCN 3.1)

Scientific classification
- Kingdom: Animalia
- Phylum: Chordata
- Class: Mammalia
- Order: Rodentia
- Family: Sciuridae
- Genus: Funambulus
- Species: F. palmarum

Binomial name
- Funambulus palmarum (Linnaeus, 1766)

Subspecies
- F. p. palmarum; F. p. brodiei; F. p. robertsoni; F. p. bellaricus

Synonyms
- Sciurus brodei Blyth, 1849; Sciurus indicus Lesson, 1835; Sciurus kelaarti Layard, 1851; Sciurus palmarum Linnaeus, 1766; Sciurus pencillatus Leach, 1814

Audio
- Recording from Tirupati, India

= Indian palm squirrel =

Species of rodent

The Indian palm squirrel or three-striped palm squirrel (Funambulus palmarum) is a species of rodent in the family Sciuridae found naturally in India (south of the Vindhyas), Pakistan (eastern districts of Karachi), Bangladesh, and Sri Lanka. In the late 19th century, the palm squirrel was introduced to Madagascar, Réunion, Mayotte, Comoro Islands, Mauritius, and Seychelles. The closely related five-striped palm squirrel (F. pennantii) is found in northern India, southern Pakistan and its range partly overlaps with this species.

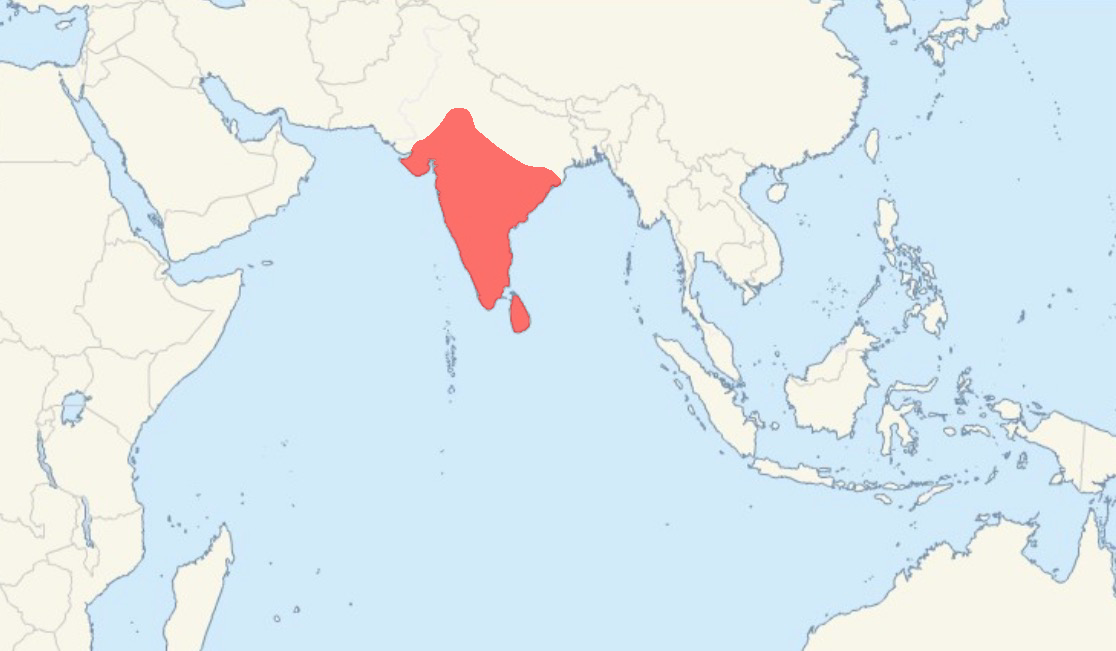
Native range of the Three Striped Palm Squirrel

== Description ==
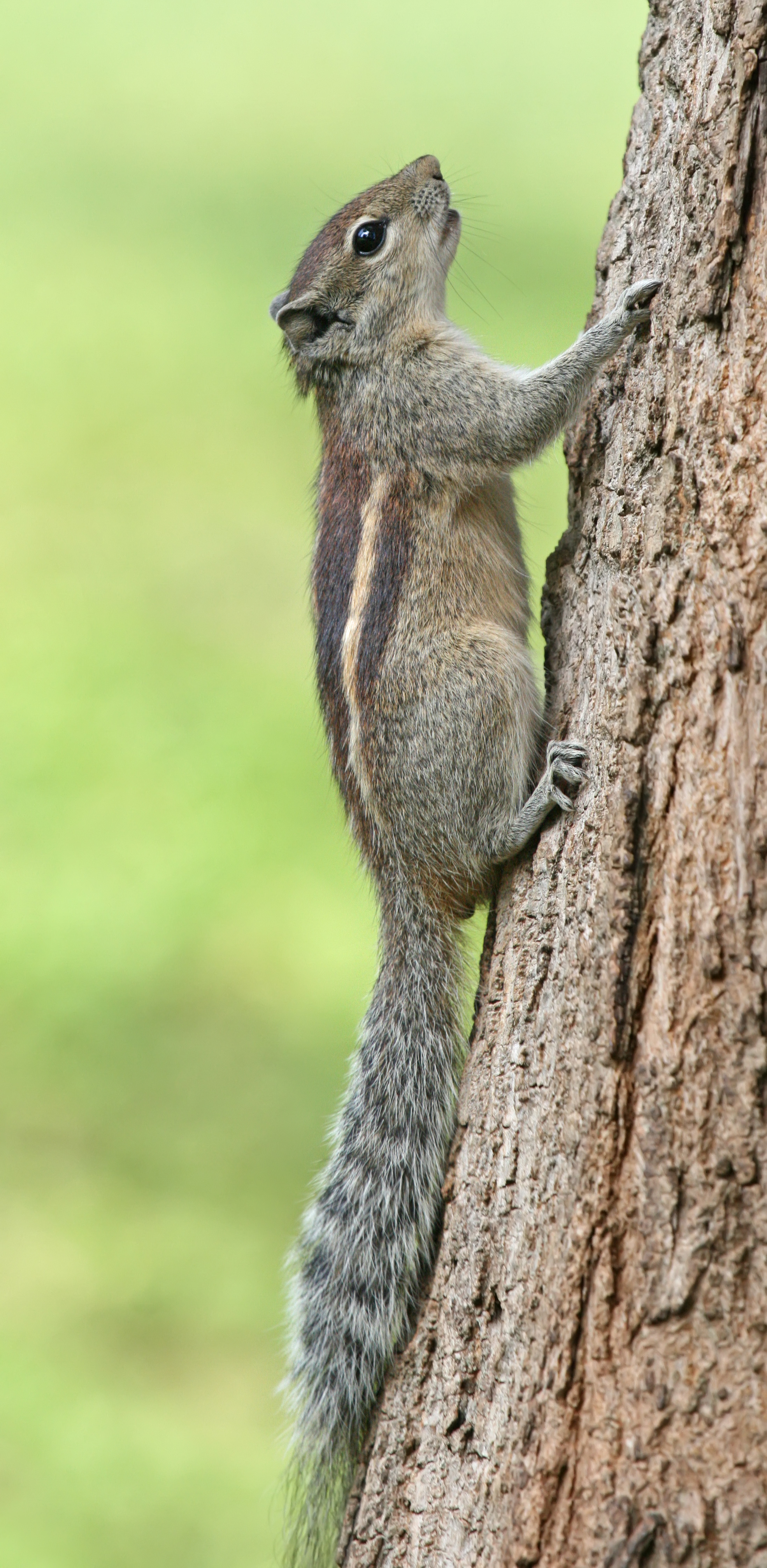
In Bangalore, India

The palm squirrel is about the size of a large chipmunk, with a bushy tail slightly shorter than its body. The back is a grizzled, grey-brown colour with three conspicuous white stripes which run from head to tail. The two outer stripes run from the forelegs to the hind legs only. It has a creamy-white belly and a tail covered with interspersed, long, black and white hair. The ears are small and triangular. Juvenile squirrels have significantly lighter coloration, which gets progressively darker as they age. Albinism is rare, but exists in this species.

== Life cycle ==
The Indian palm squirrel exhibits a variety of reproductive behaviors; some display cyclical periodicity activity while others show continuous reproductive activity. The gestation period is 34 days; breeding takes place in grass nests during the autumn. Litters of two or three are common, and average 2.75. The young are weaned after about 10 weeks and are sexually mature at 9 months. The adult weight is 100 grams. Little is known about their longevity, but one specimen lived 5.5 years in captivity.

== Diet and behaviour ==
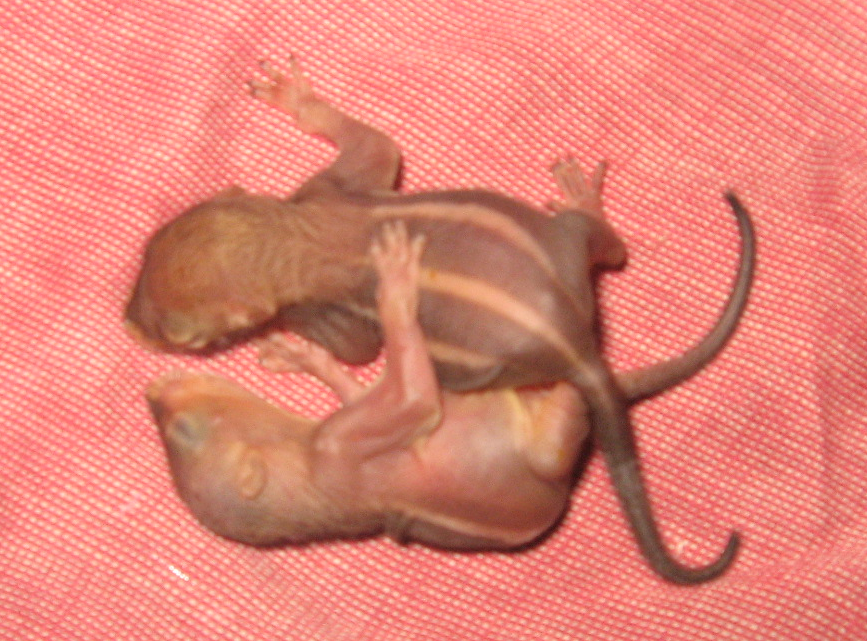
A pair of baby three-striped Indian palm squirrels, a week after they were rescued after they fell from a coconut tree

The Indian palm squirrel is a solitary animal, spending a majority of its life without interaction with others their own species, with the exception of mating and child rearing. While nuts and fruits make up a majority of its diet, the Indian palm squirrel will also eat insects, other smaller mammals, and reptiles. They are fairly vocal, with a cry that sounds like "chip chip chip" when danger is present. They are opportunists in urban areas, and can be easily tamed and trained to accept food from humans. Naturally active, their activity reaches levels of frenzy during the mating season. They tend to be very protective of their food sources, often guarding and defending them from birds and other squirrels.

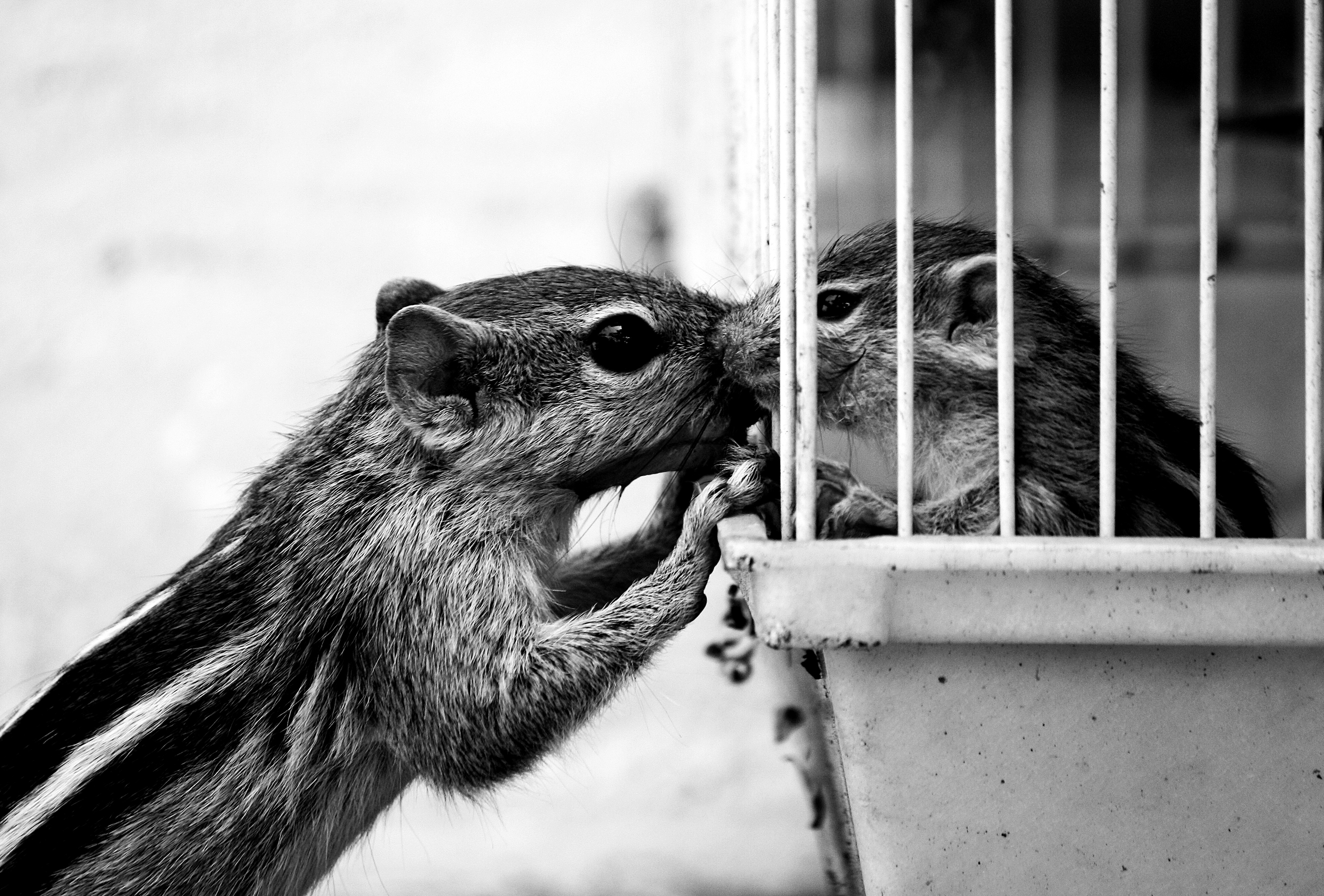
An Indian palm squirrel with its pup

Unlike some other species of squirrel, the Indian palm squirrel does not hibernate.

== Importance in Hinduism ==
Squirrels are considered sacred by Hindus and are not to be harmed. They are even fed by many Hindu families because of their association with Rama.

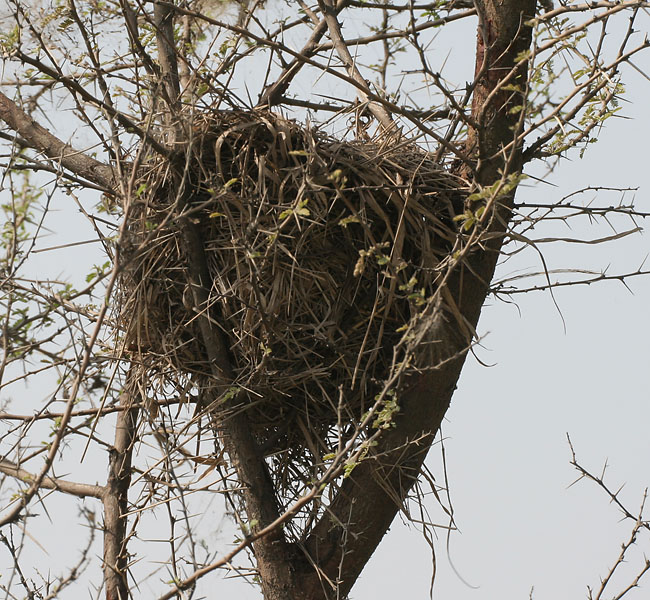
An Indian palm squirrel nest

A legend explains the stripes on the back of most of the squirrels. During the construction of the Rama Setu (bridge) at Rameswaram by Sri Rama and the Vanara Sena or monkey army, a little squirrel also contributed in its own little way. It rolled in the beach sand and then ran to the end of the bridge to shake off the sand from its back. Sri Rama, pleased by the creature's dedication, caressed the squirrel's back and ever since, the Indian squirrel carried white stripes on its back, which are believed to be the mark of Rama's fingers. Sri Rama and the squirrel are mentioned in one of the hymns of the Alvars.

== Subspecies ==
Generally four valid subspecies are described according to the geographic distribution. But many more subspecies are also described, but not given validity.

- Valid subspecies
  - Funambulus palmarum bellaricus (Wroughton, 1916)
  - Funambulus palmarum palmarum (Linnaeus, 1766)
  - Funambulus palmarum brodiei (Blyth, 1849)
  - Funambulus palmarum robertsoni (Wroughton, 1916)
- Invalid subspecies
  - Funambulus palmarum bengalensis (Wroughton, 1916)
  - Funambulus palmarum comorinus (Wroughton, 1905)
  - Funambulus palmarum gossei (Wroughton and Davidson, 1919)
  - Funambulus palmarum kelaarti (Layard, 1851)
  - Funambulus palmarum matugamensis (Lindsay, 1926)
  - Funambulus palmarum olympius (Thomas and Wroughton, 1915)
  - Funambulus palmarum penicillatus (Leach, 1814)
  - Funambulus palmarum favonicus (Thomas and Wroughton, 1915)
