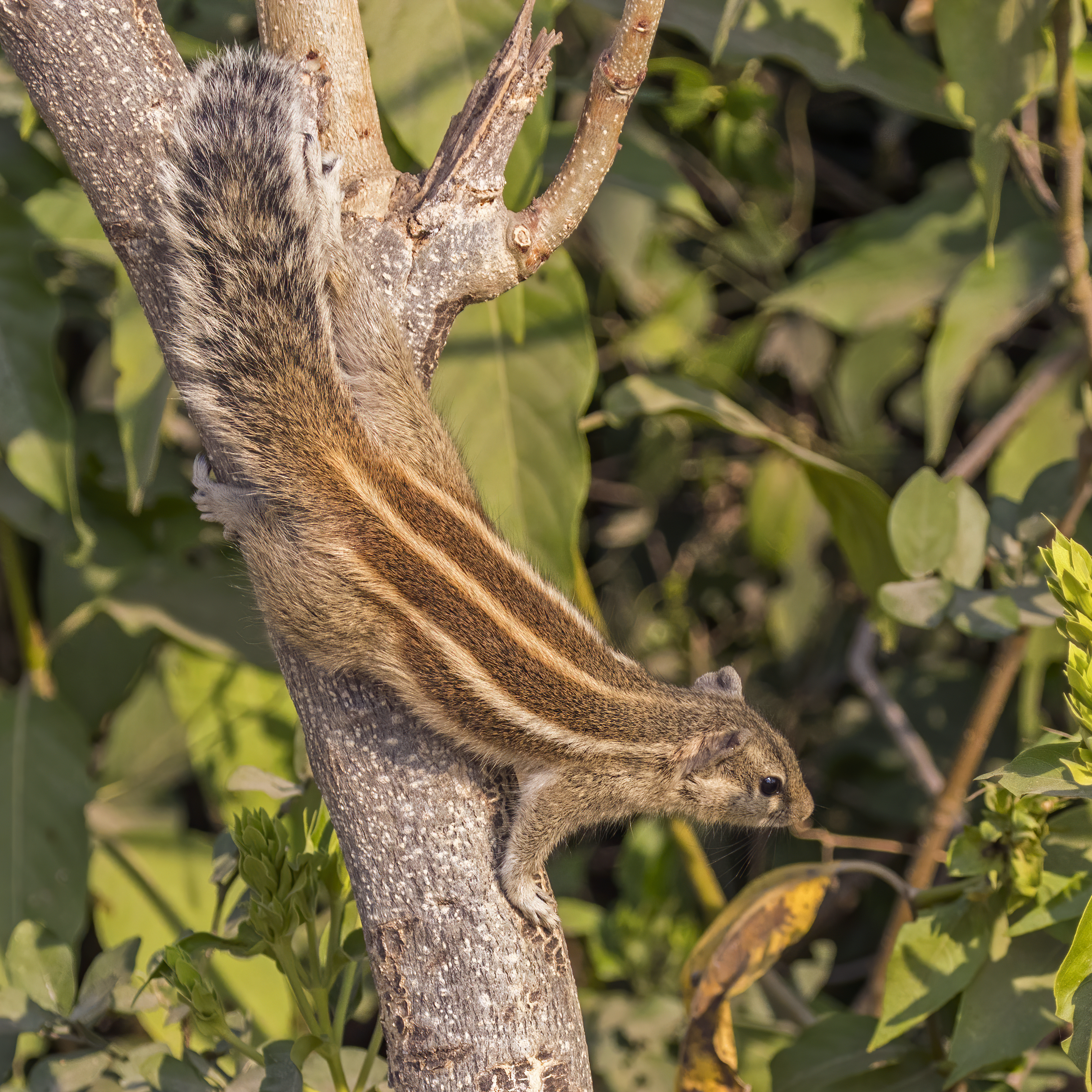
- At Keoladeo National Park, Bharatpur, Rajasthan, India

Conservation status
- Least Concern (IUCN 3.1)

Scientific classification
- Kingdom: Animalia
- Phylum: Chordata
- Class: Mammalia
- Order: Rodentia
- Family: Sciuridae
- Genus: Funambulus
- Subgenus: Prasadsciurus; Moore & Tate, 1965
- Species: F. pennantii

Binomial name
- Funambulus pennantii Wroughton, 1905

Subspecies
- F. p. pennantii; F. p. argentescens

Synonyms
- F. pennanti

= Northern palm squirrel =

Species of rodent

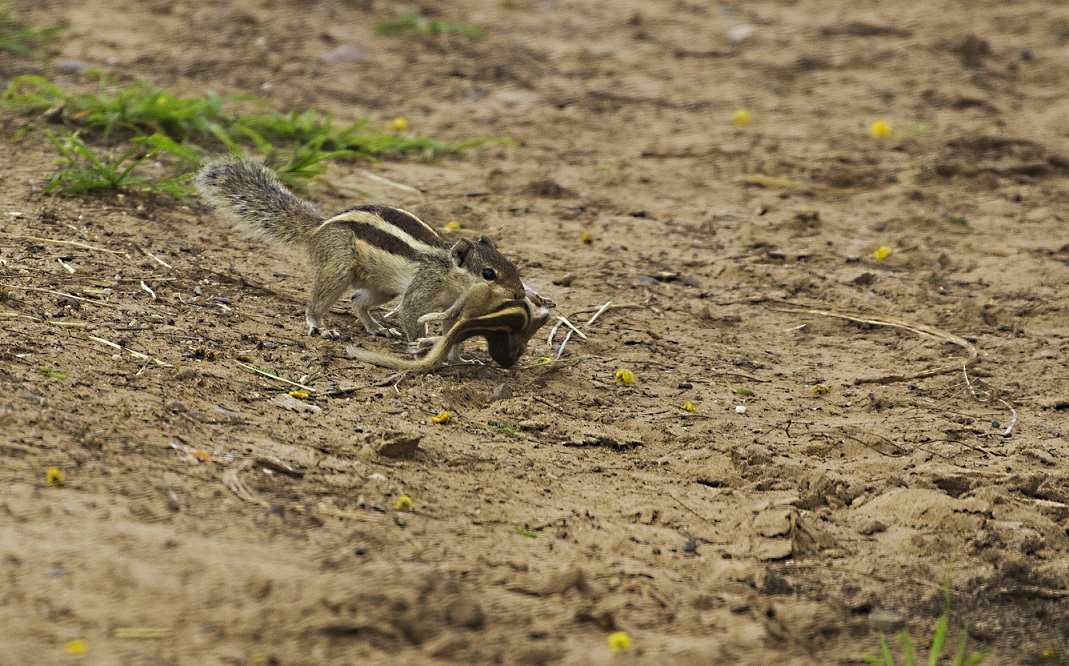
A five-striped palm squirrel refuses to leave her dead baby. She carried it in her mouth near Deva village in Anand, Gujarat.

The northern palm squirrel (Funambulus pennantii), also called the five-striped palm squirrel, is a species of rodent in the family Sciuridae. Some authorities recognize two subspecies, F. p. pennantii and F. p. argentescens. It is a semi-arboreal species found in tropical and subtropical dry deciduous forests and many other rural and urban habitats. It is a common species with a wide range and the International Union for Conservation of Nature has rated its conservation status as being of "least concern".

== Distribution ==
It is found in the Andaman Islands, Nicobar Islands (where it was introduced), India, Nepal, Bangladesh, Pakistan and Iran. In India, it is fairly common in urban areas, even in large cities such as Delhi and Kolkata. Two subspecies, Funambulus pennantii argentescens and Funambulus pennantii lutescens, were suggested by Wroughton in addition to the nominate race; however, more recent workers do not make this distinction.

Thorington and Hoffman in Wilson and Reeder (2005) listed only two subspecies: F. p. pennantii and F. p. argentescens. However, Ghose, et al. (2004), described two additional subspecies: F. p. chhattisgarhi (distribution: eastern part of Maharashtra, Madhya Pradesh, Orissa, West Bengal, and Bihar) and F. p. gangutrianus (distribution: West Bengal, Madhya Pradesh, Uttar Pradesh, and Nepal), but Talmale (2007) treated the Maharashtra populations as F. p. pennantii only due to the overlapping in measurements and color variations observed in the specimens.

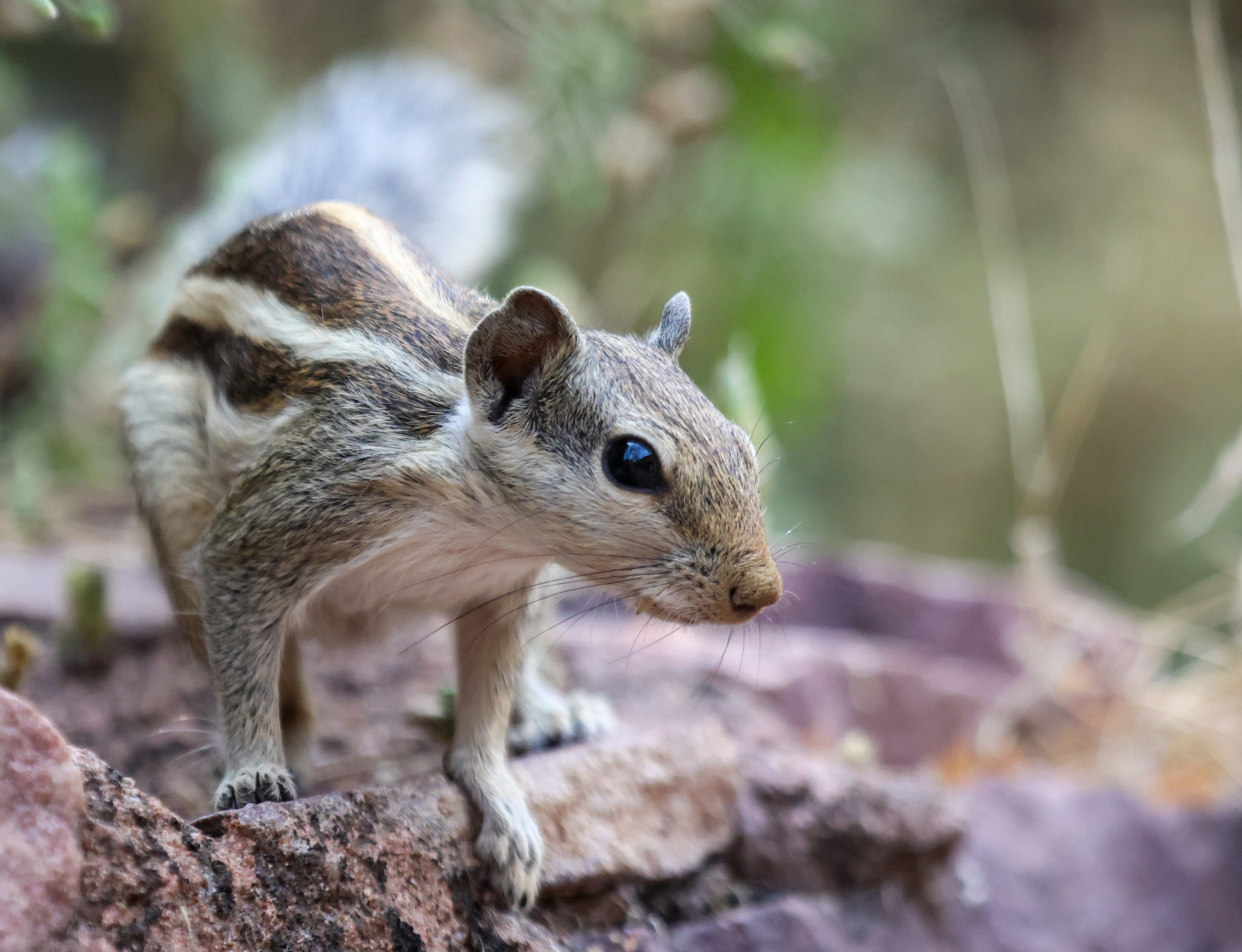
Northern palm squirrel from Ranthambore Fort

It has also been introduced to Australia, where it is found in a very limited area, and the United Arab Emirates due to the exotic pet trade. In Perth, Western Australia, there is an established population resulting from zoo escapees, and a population recorded around Mosman, New South Wales and near Taronga Zoo that may have become extinct. The feral populace, known locally as the five-lined palm squirrel, ranges out to the suburbs surrounding the Perth Zoo and also inhabits the grounds. They give birth over a period from August to May and most intensively around the austral spring and autumn.

In India, the southern boundary of the species' range is not clearly identified, and recent records suggest it may extend as far as Madanapalli. The southern boundary on the Western Ghats side extends to localities including Dharwar and Mysore, in Karnataka.

== Habitat ==
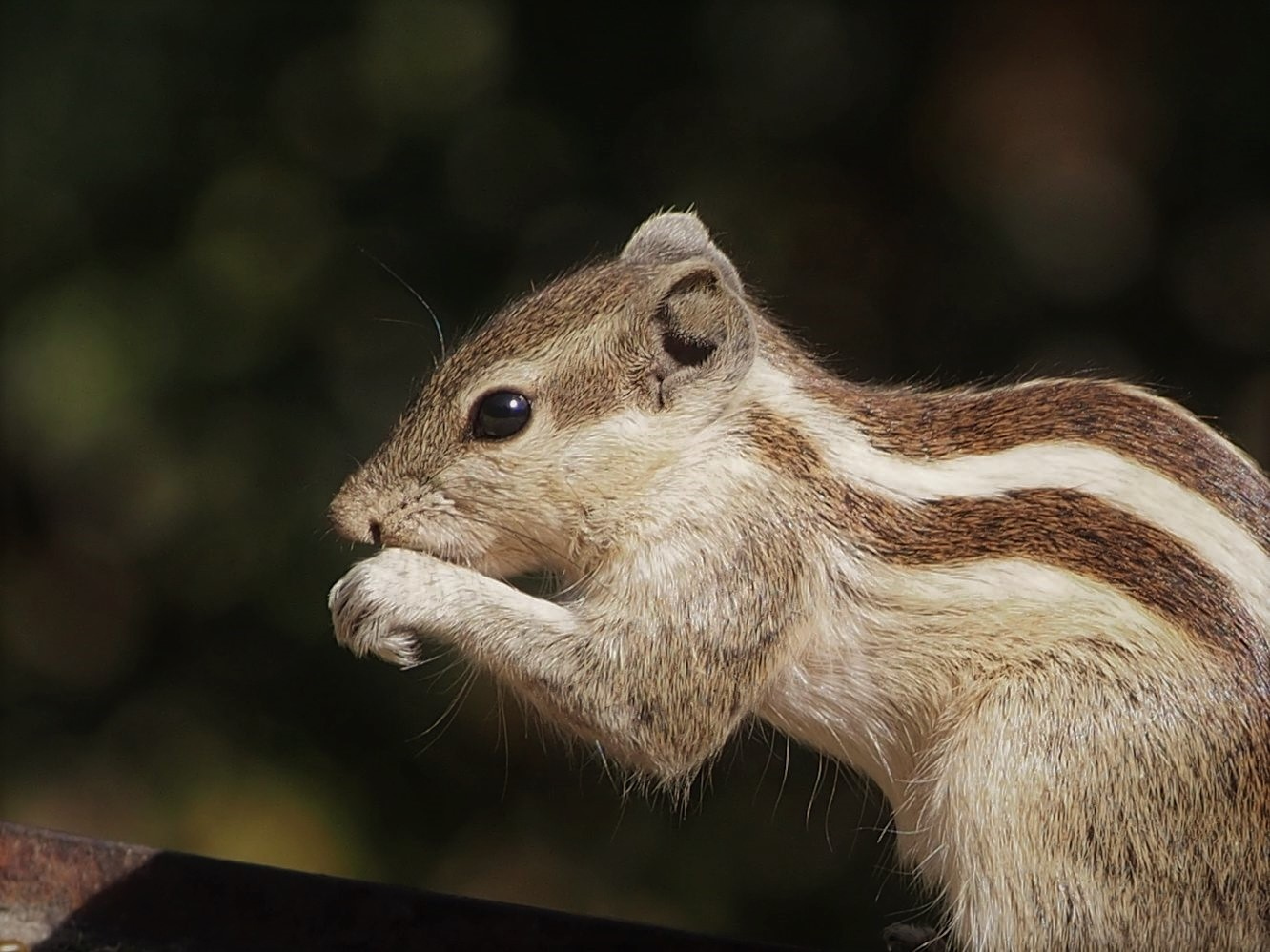
Aurangabad, Maharashtra, India

The northern palm squirrel is a very adaptable species. It occurs in tropical and subtropical dry deciduous forest, montane forests to altitudes of 4,000 m (13,123 ft), scrublands, plantations, grasslands, arable land, rural gardens and urban areas.

== Status ==
The northern palm squirrel is a common species throughout most of its wide range. It is an adaptable species and no particular threats have been identified. The International Union for Conservation of Nature has rated its conservation status as being of "least concern".

== Disease ==
These squirrels do not naturally suffer from foot and mouth disease. Tewari et al. 1976 did experimentally infect them and the resulting disease was severe. However, no transmission could be induced.
