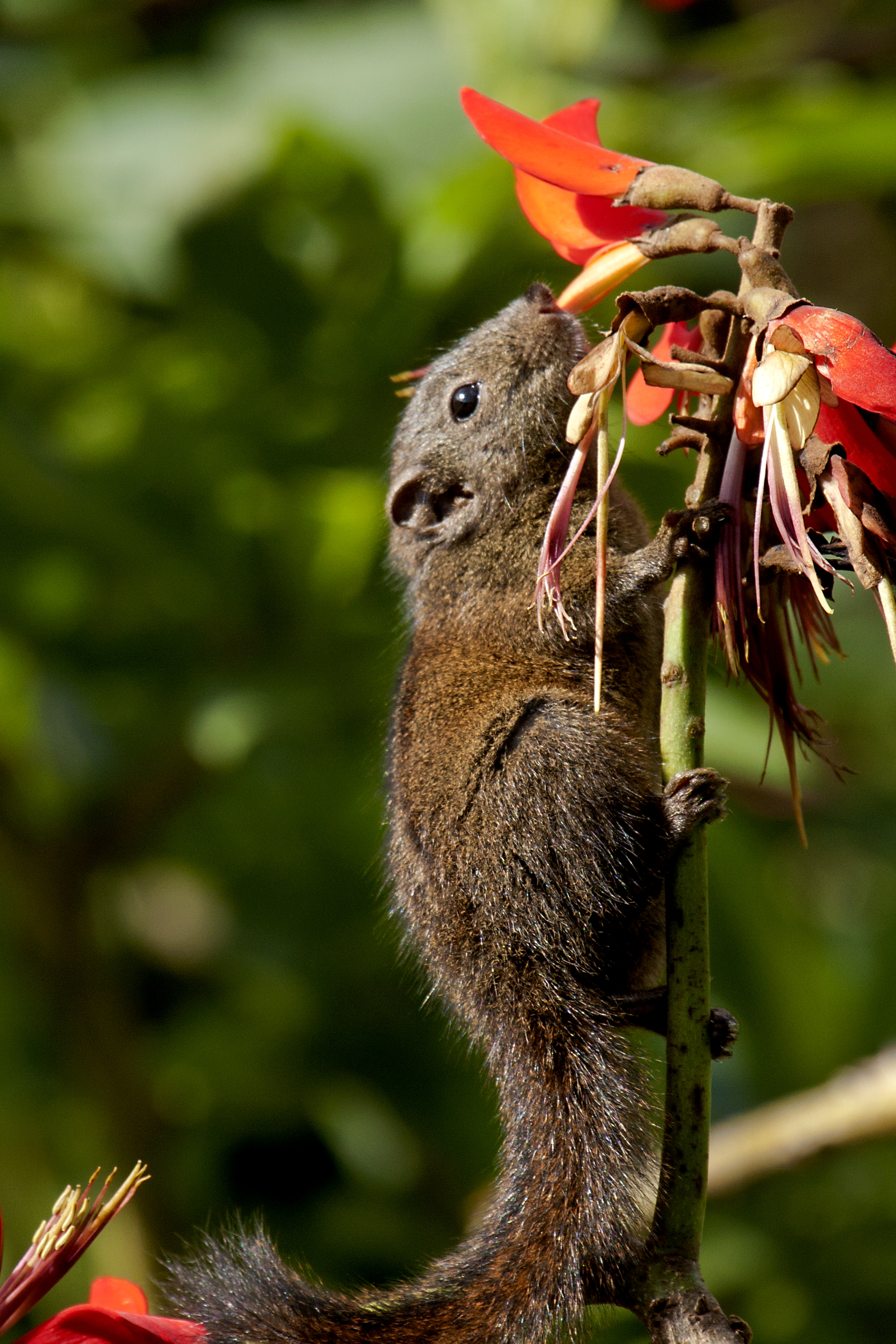

Conservation status
- Vulnerable (IUCN 3.1)

Scientific classification
- Kingdom: Animalia
- Phylum: Chordata
- Class: Mammalia
- Order: Rodentia
- Family: Sciuridae
- Genus: Funambulus
- Species: F. sublineatus

Binomial name
- Funambulus sublineatus (Waterhouse, 1838)

Subspecies
- See text

Synonyms
- Sciurus delesserti Gervais, 1841; Sciurus sublineatus Waterhouse, 1838; Sciurus trilineatus Kelaart, 1852; Tamoides sublineatus Phillips, 1935

= Nilgiri striped squirrel =

Species of rodent

The Nilgiri striped squirrel (Funambulus sublineatus) is a threatened species of rodent, a small squirrel (Sciuridae) from rainforests in the southern Western Ghats, including the Nilgiris, in Peninsular India. It formerly included Funambulus obscurus from Sri Lanka as a subspecies, at which point the English name of the "combined species" also was dusky striped squirrel (a name now restricted to the Sri Lankan species).

== Taxonomy ==
Funambulus sublineatus was scientifically described in 1838. Later it was merged with the Sri Lankan obscurus, then regarded as a subspecies of Funambulus sublineatus. In 2012, a review found that the two were highly distinct and recommended that they should be recognized as separate species.

== Distribution ==
The former range of the species, before the taxonomic split, was in both India and Sri Lanka, though the Nilgiri palm squirrel (F. sublineatus) is now restricted in distribution to the Western Ghats of India. Very little is known of this squirrel, probably the smallest in the genus weighing about 40g. Its new status as an endemic mammal to India means records need updating.

The species is confined to wet humid forests in the Western Ghats and Nilgiri hills (and surrounding areas such as around Kodaikanal in India).
