= Ceylon spiny mouse =

Conservation status
- Endangered (IUCN 3.1)

Scientific classification
- Kingdom: Animalia
- Phylum: Chordata
- Class: Mammalia
- Order: Rodentia
- Family: Muridae
- Genus: Mus
- Subgenus: Pyromys
- Species: M. fernandoni

Binomial name
- Mus fernandoni (Phillips, 1932)
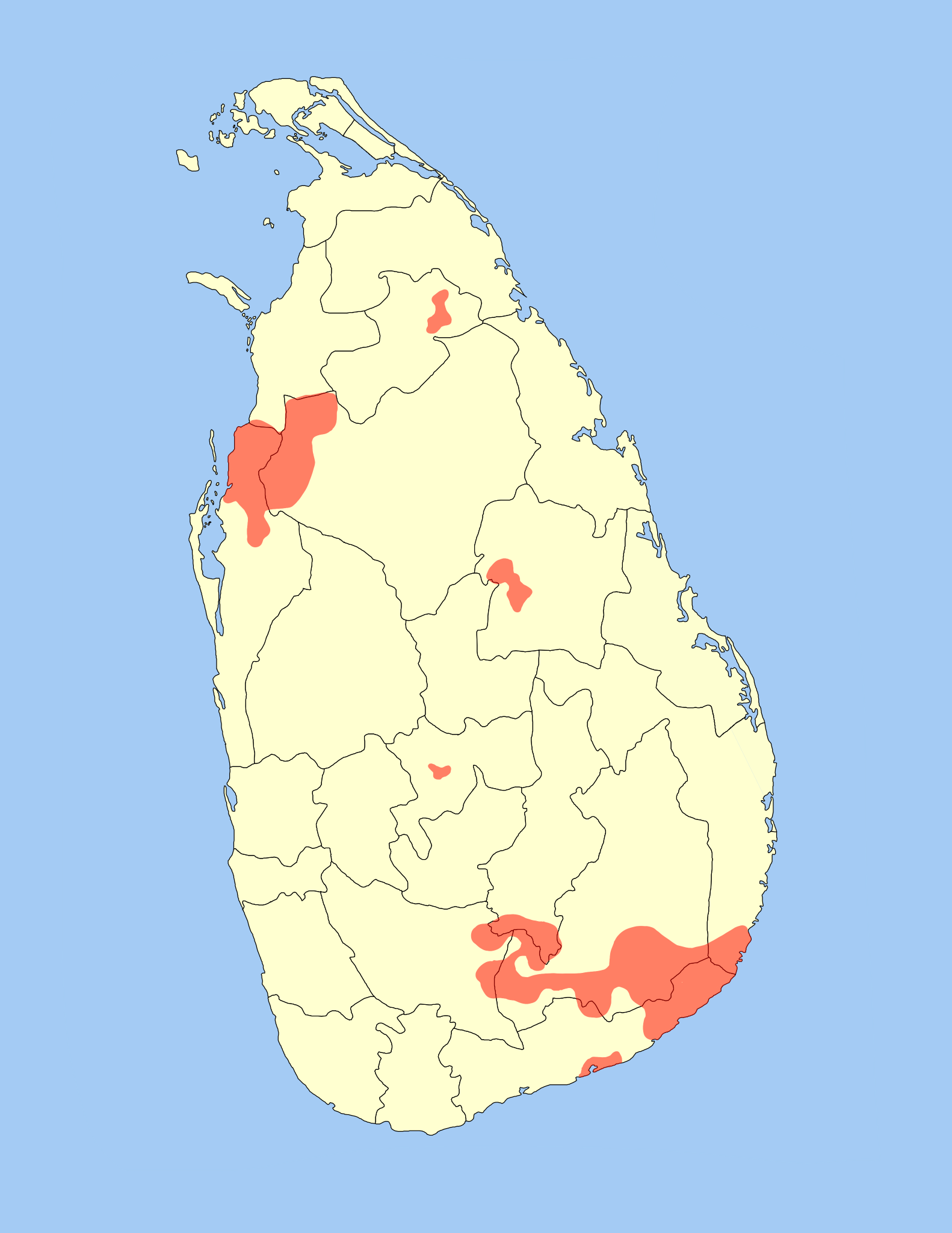

Species of rodent

The Ceylon spiny mouse (Mus fernandoni) is a species of rodent in the family Muridae. It is found only in Sri Lanka, where it is known as ශ්‍රී ලංකා ක‍ටු හීන් මීයා in Sinhala language.

== Description ==
Head and body length 9–11 cm. Tail 6–7 cm. Reddish gray above, with gray flat spines (each with 11mm in length) and the reddish hue from the intermixed fine fur. The underparts are pure white with many long black hairs overlying. Whitish to grayish underparts, sometimes with a reddish-brown tinge. The ears are dark and relatively large. Snout pointed. Tail scaly, dark purple in color, and longer than body length. The incisors are orange.

== Range ==
The Ceylon spiny mouse is an endangered species known only from the following locations.

- Central Province, Sri Lanka (Kumbalaghamuwa)
- North Eastern Province, Sri Lanka (Kumana)
- Southern Province, Sri Lanka (Buttawa in Hambantota and Yala National Park)
- Uva Province (Galge in Monaragala)
