= Wilpattu National Park =

National park in Sri Lanka

- IUCN category II (national park)
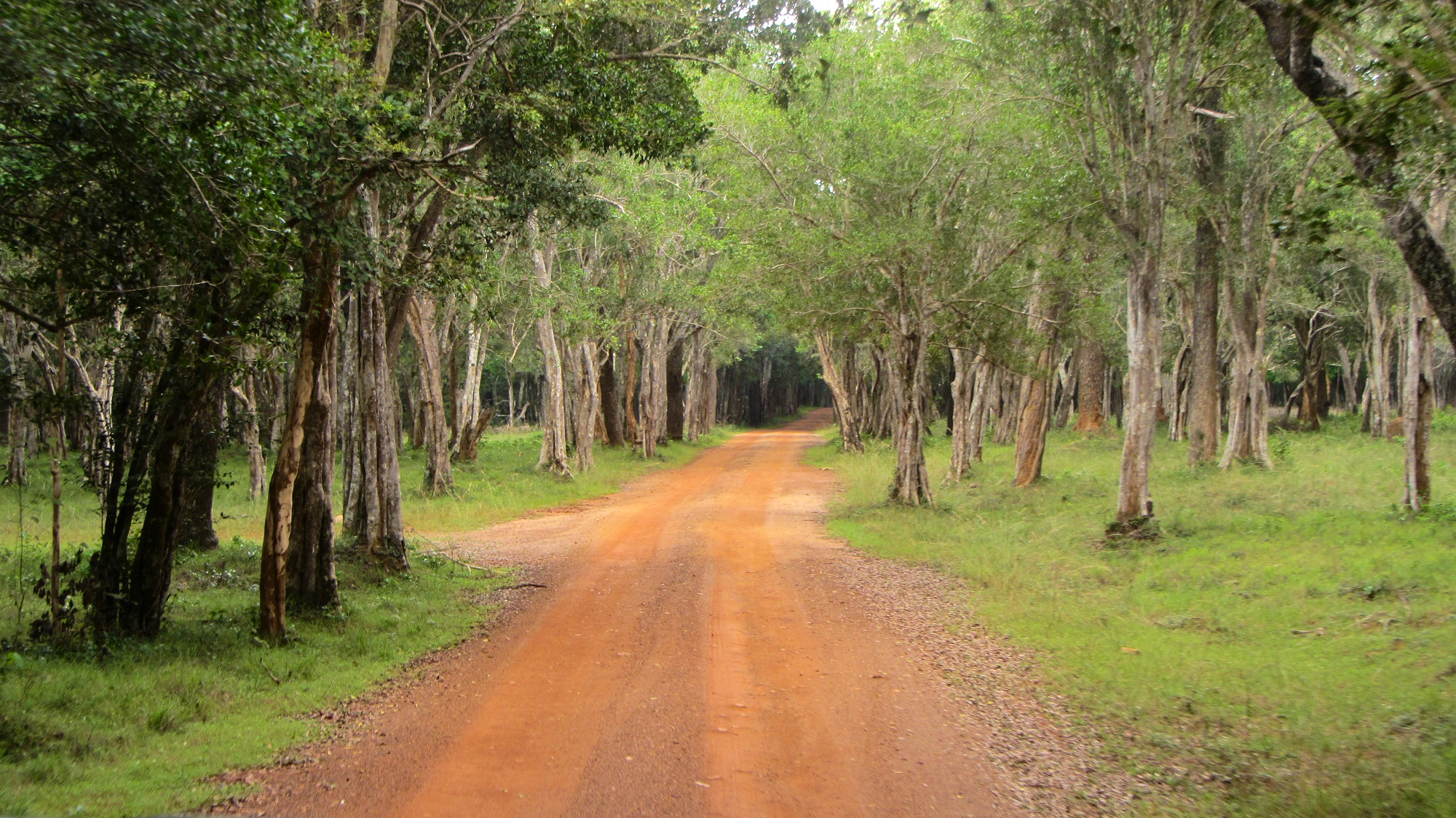
- One of the many trails within the park

- Location within Sri Lanka
- Location: North Western and North Central provinces, Sri Lanka
- Nearest city: Mannar, Anuradhapura, Puttalam
- Coordinates: 8°26′N 80°00′E
- Area: 1,316.671 km^{2} (508.370 sq mi)
- Established: 1905 (Wildlife sanctuary); 25 December 1938 (National park)
- Governing body: Department of Wildlife Conservation

Ramsar Wetland
- Official name: Wilpattu Ramsar Wetland Cluster
- Designated: 2 February 2013
- Reference no.: 2095

Wilpattu National Park (Sinhala: විල්පත්තු ජාතික වනෝද්‍යානය) is one of the oldest national parks in Sri Lanka. The unique feature of this park is the existence of "Willus" (natural lakes) – natural, sand-rimmed water basins or depressions that fill with rainwater. Located on the northwest coast lowland dry zone of Sri Lanka, the park is 30 km (19 mi) west of Anuradhapura and 26 km (16 mi) north of Puttalam (approximately 180 km (110 mi) north of Colombo). The park is 1,317 km^{2} (508 sq mi) (131,693 hectares) in area and ranges from 0–152 m (0–499 ft) above sea level. Nearly one hundred and six lakes (Willu) and tanks are found spread throughout Wilpattu.

== History ==
The Mahavansa records that in 543 BC Prince Vijaya landed at Tambapanni now known as Kudrimalai Point (Horse Point), established the Sinhalese kingdom in Tambapanni and founded the Sinhala nation. In 1905 the area was designated a sanctuary and in 1938 it was upgraded to the National Park status.'

Kudrimalai, or Horse Point, was visited by a subject of Emperor Claudius in 47 AD, who was blown off course by the monsoon. The local king later sent his own envoys to Rome during the time of Pliny.

From December 1988 to 16 March 2003, the park was closed due to security concerns surrounding the Sri Lankan Civil War, before being reopened to visitors sixteen years later. Visitor access is currently limited to approximately 25% of the park, the remainder of which is dense forest or scrub. Popular visiting periods span between the months of February and October, although there are a number of private ecotourism groups that conduct safaris year-round.

== Climate ==
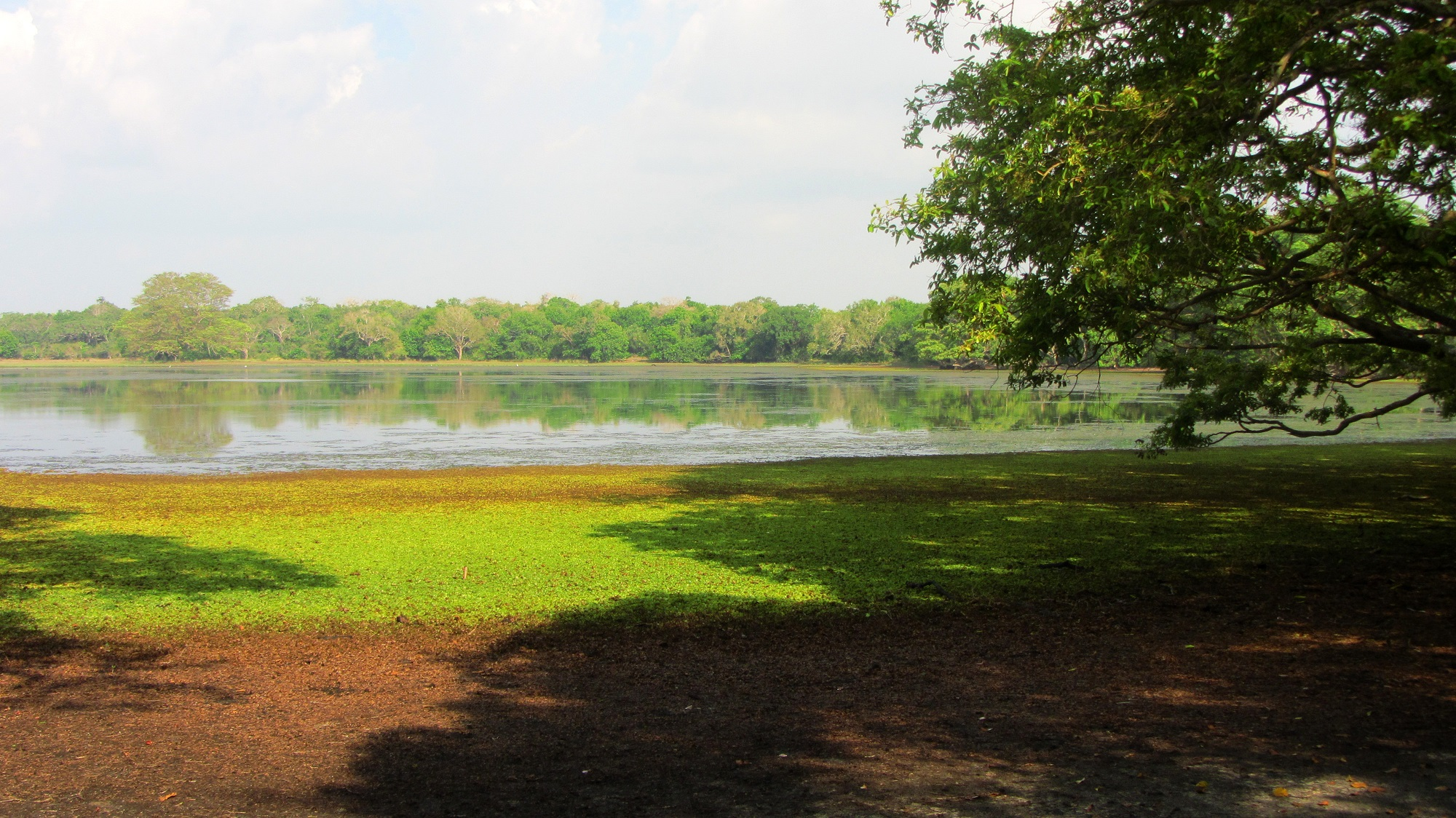
Marshy vegetation

The annual rainfall is about 1,000 mm (39 in) and the average temperature is about 27.2 °C (81.0 °F). Inter-monsoonal rains in March and the northeast monsoon (December – February) are the main sources of rainfall.

== Flora and fauna ==
There are many types of vegetation to be found in Wilpattu, including littoral vegetation, such as salt grass and low scrub monsoon forest with tall emergents, such as palu (Manilkara hexandra), and satin (Chloroxylon swietenia), milla (Vitex altissima), weera (Drypetes sepiaria), ebony (Diospyros ebenum) and wewarna (Alseodaphne semecapriflolia).

31 species of mammals have been identified within Wilpattu national park. Mammals that are identified as threatened species living within the Wilpattu National Park are the elephant (Elephas maximus maximus), sloth bear (Melursus ursinus inornatus), leopard (Panthera pardus kotiya) and water buffalo (Bubalus bubalis). sambar (Rusa unicolor unicolor), spotted deer (Axis axis ceylonensis), mongoose, mouse and shrew are more of Wilpattu's residents.

=== Birds ===
The painted stork, the open bill, little cormorant, Sri Lankan junglefowl (Gallus lafayetii) along with many species of owls, terns, gulls, eagles, kites buzzards are to be found at Wilpattu National Park. Wetland bird species that can be seen in Wilpattu are the garganey (Anas querquedula), pintail (Anas acuta), whistling teal (Dendrocygna javanica), spoonbill (Platalea leucorodia), black-headed ibis (Threskiornis malanocephalus), large white egret (Egretta alba modesta), cattle egret (Bubulcus ibis) and purple heron (Ardea purpurea).

=== Leopards ===
Wilpattu is world-renowned for its leopard (Panthera pardus kotiya) population. A remote camera survey conducted in Wilpattu from July to October 2015 by the Wilderness and Wildlife Conservation Trust captured photographs of forty-nine individual leopards in the surveyed area, the core area density of which was between that of Yala National Park's Block I and Horton Plains National Park.

A second, more extensive camera trap survey was conducted from May to September 2018 by Samarasinghe et al. (2022), covering a substantial area of the national park, approximately 660 km^{2}, and capturing a total of 133 individual leopards. This count comprised 116 independent leopards (aged over 2 years) and 17 cubs. Eight adult females were observed with 1–2 cubs during the study. Utilizing Bayesian spatial capture-recapture models, the population density of leopards in Wilpattu National Park was estimated to be 18 leopards per 100 km^{2}. The mean abundance within the effectively sampled area was calculated to be 144 leopards. Notably, the national park maintains a healthy sex ratio of male to female leopards, estimated to be 1:2.03.

=== Reptiles ===
The most common reptiles found in the park are the Sri Lankan land monitor (varanus bengalensis), mugger crocodile (crocodylus palustris), Sri Lankan cobra (naja naja), rat snake (ptyas mucosus), Sri Lankan python (python molurus), Sri Lankan black turtle (melanochelys trijuga) and Sri Lankan flapshell turtle (lissemys ceylonensis) which are resident in the large permanent villus.

== Expansion of the boundary ==
The boundary of the Wilpattu national park originally enclosed the Puttalam District in the south and Anuradhapura District in the east. On October 10, 2012, the government published several gazettes (section 3 of the forest conservation ordinance, chapter 451) which effectively extended the park's boundary to include regions of the northern province. The expansion of the Wilpattu National Park boundary in 2012 is considered a significant obstacle for internally displaced people, particularly those affected by the Expulsion of Muslims from the Northern Province of Sri Lanka by the LTTE to return to their homeland.

== Deforestation ==
After the end of the civil war, allegations had been made that parts of the reserve has been occupied to build houses by certain politicians in an attempt to create Muslim colonies in Wilpattu. The multiple civil societies and researchers put forth the notion that these were people who had been forcibly driven away by the LTTE in 1990 in accordance to their ethnic cleansing policy who had returned to their original villages. Notably, the park was extended to the current size in 1999 after the ethnic cleansing where the old villages were marked as part of the park as claimed by the people in this area. Aerial images taken in 2018 reputedly shows that a considerable portion of the forest has been opened up and a large number of small houses being built in the area.

== Gallery ==
Photographs of animals taken within the national park.

=== Birds ===
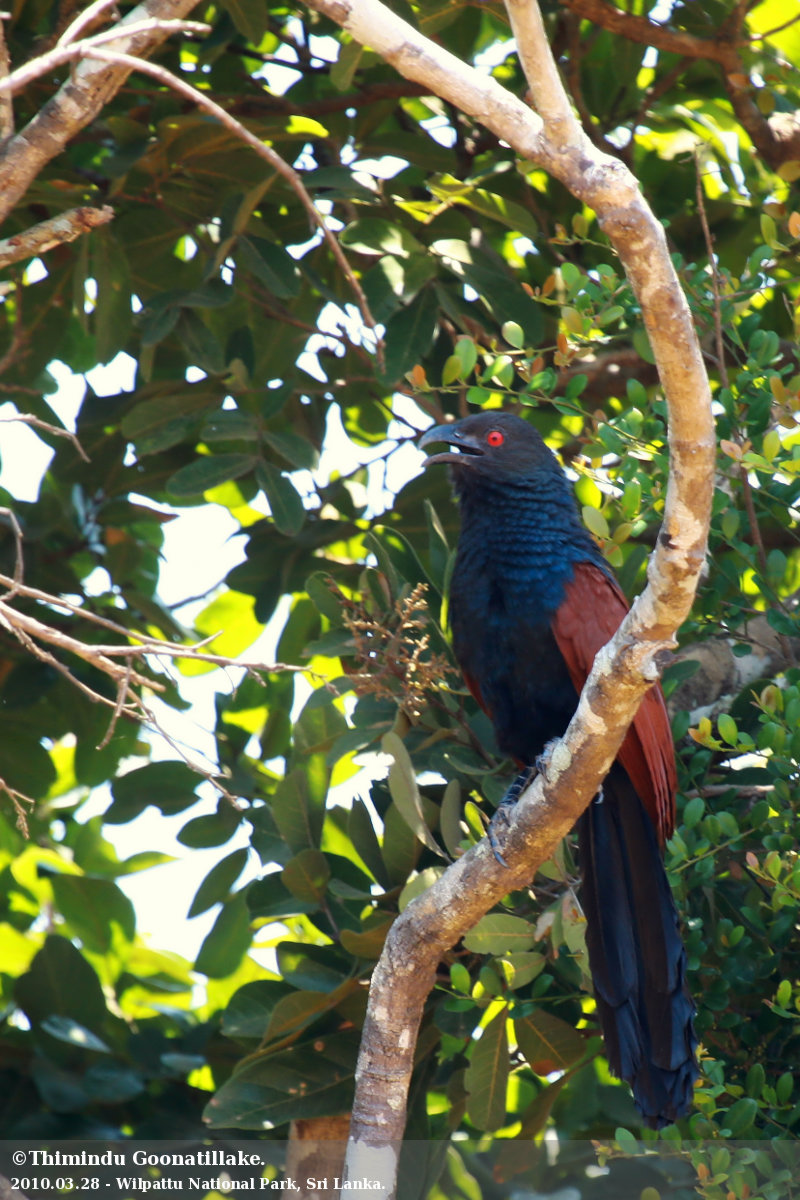
Greater coucal

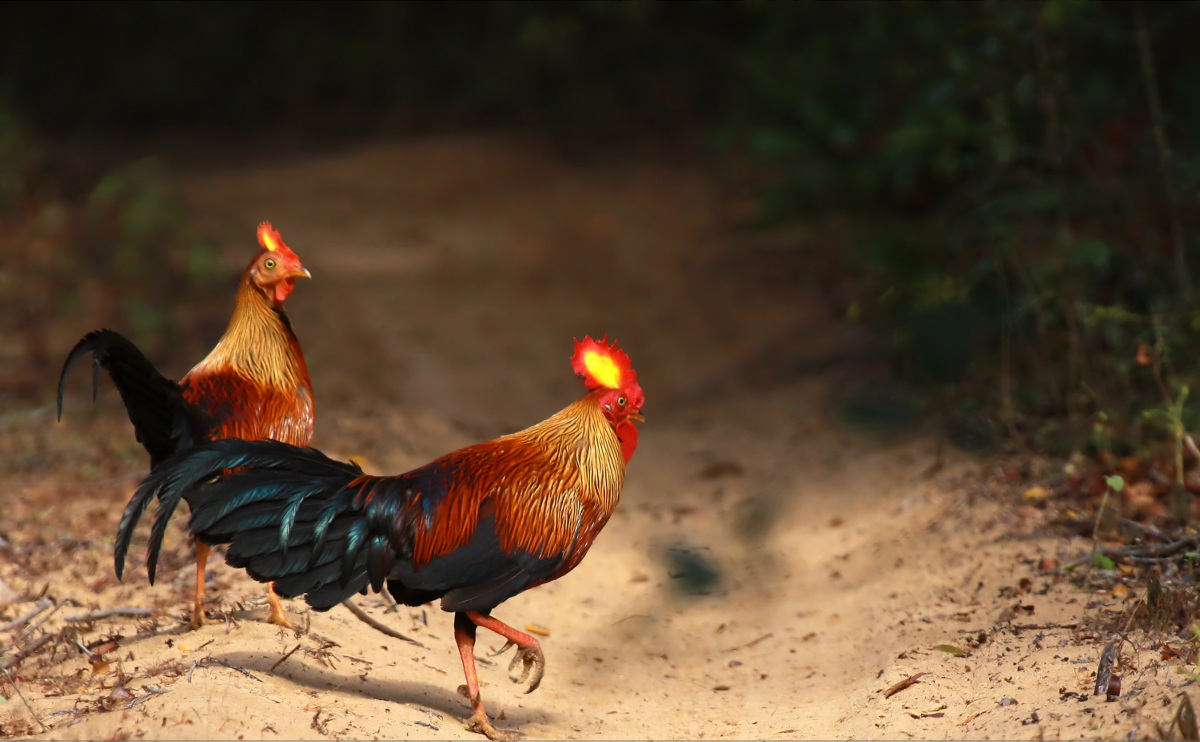
Sri Lankan junglefowl

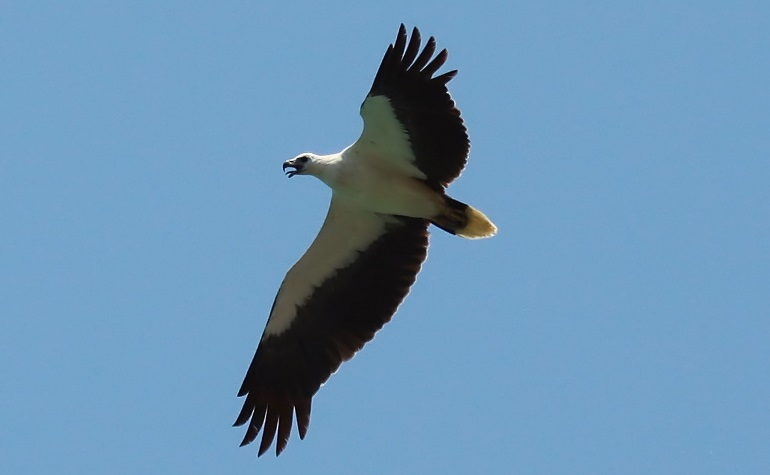
White-bellied sea eagle

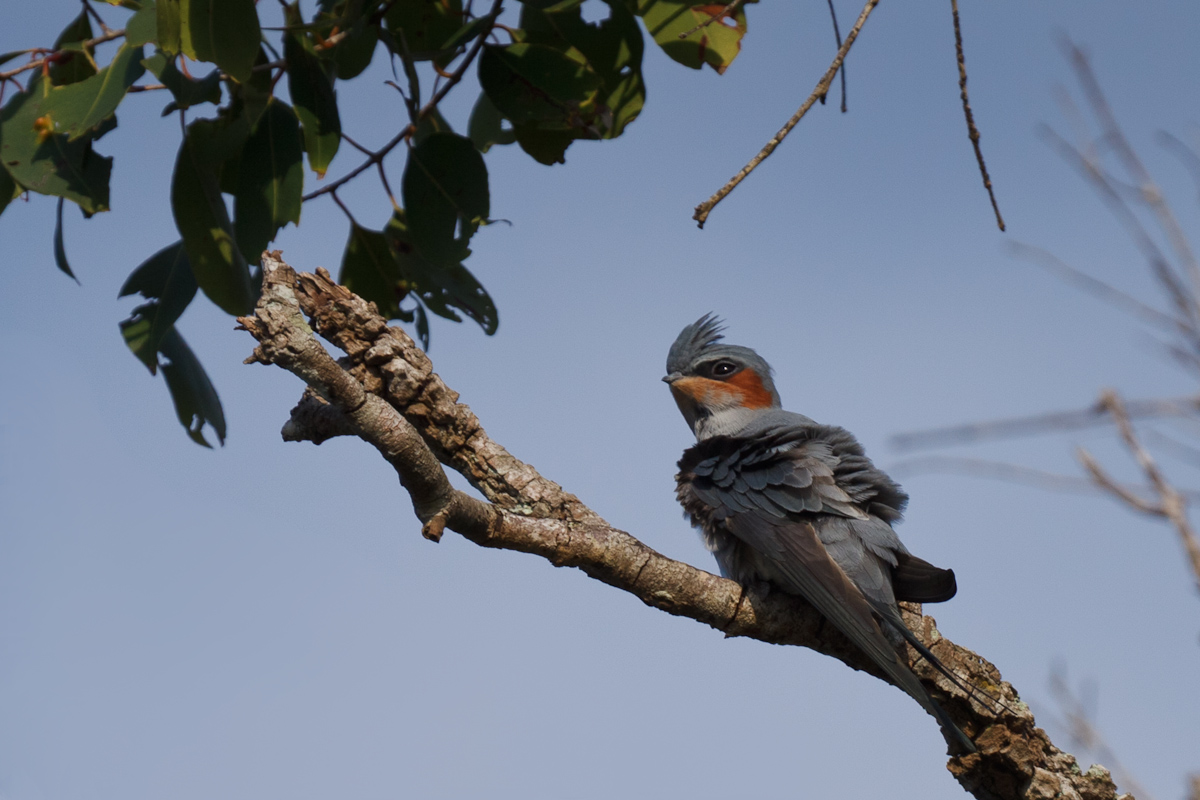
Crested treeswift

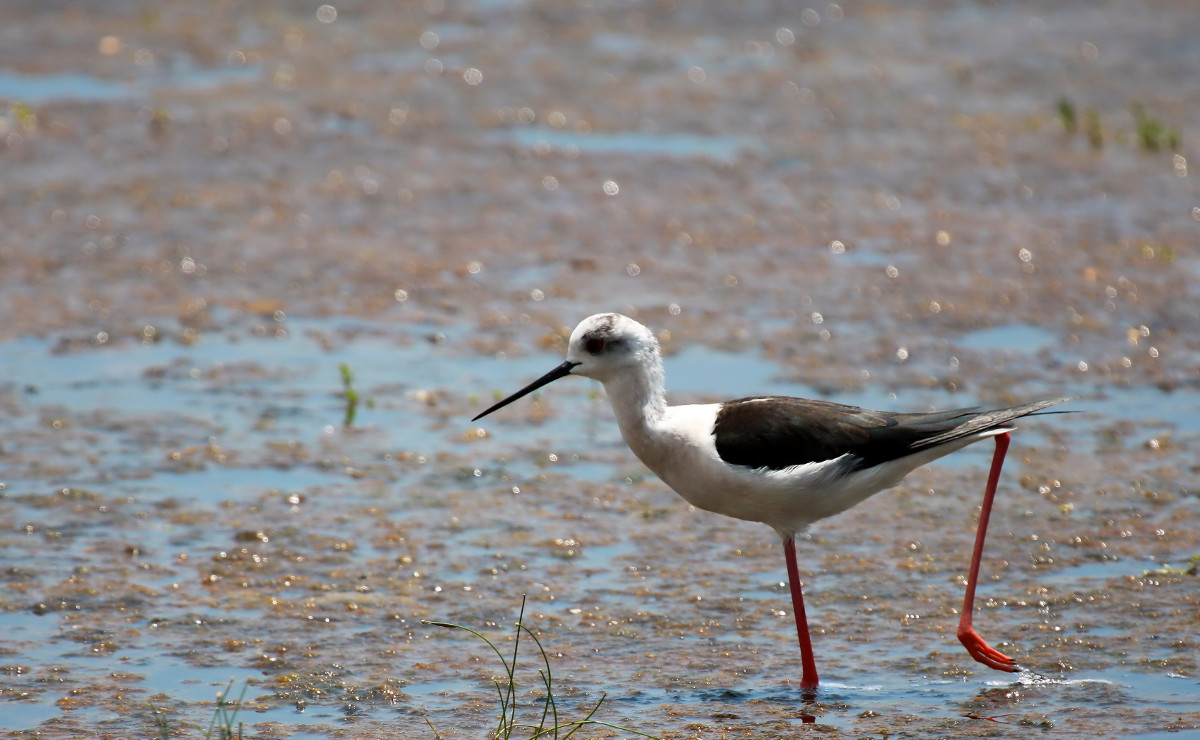
Black-winged stilt

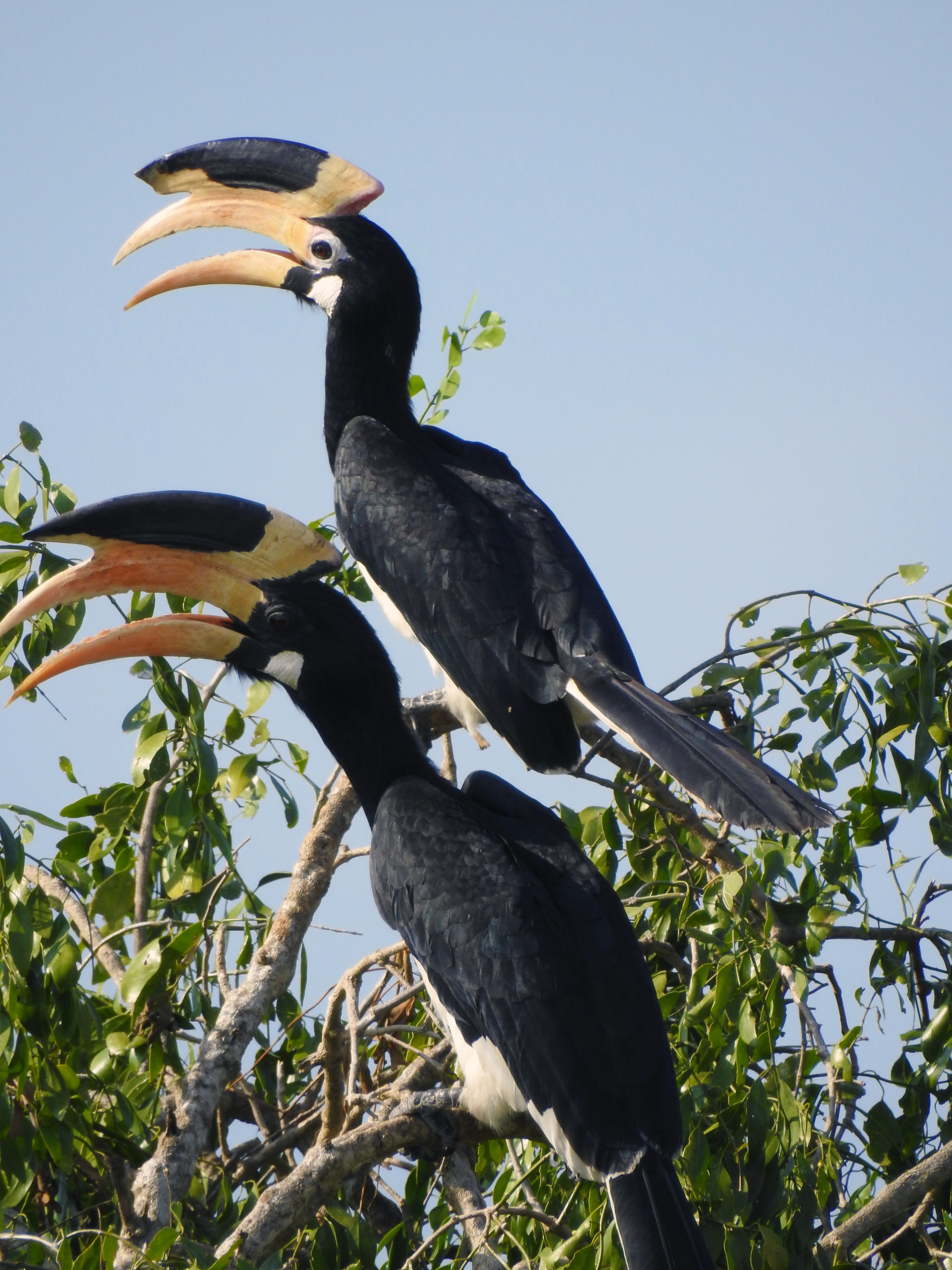
Malabar pied hornbill

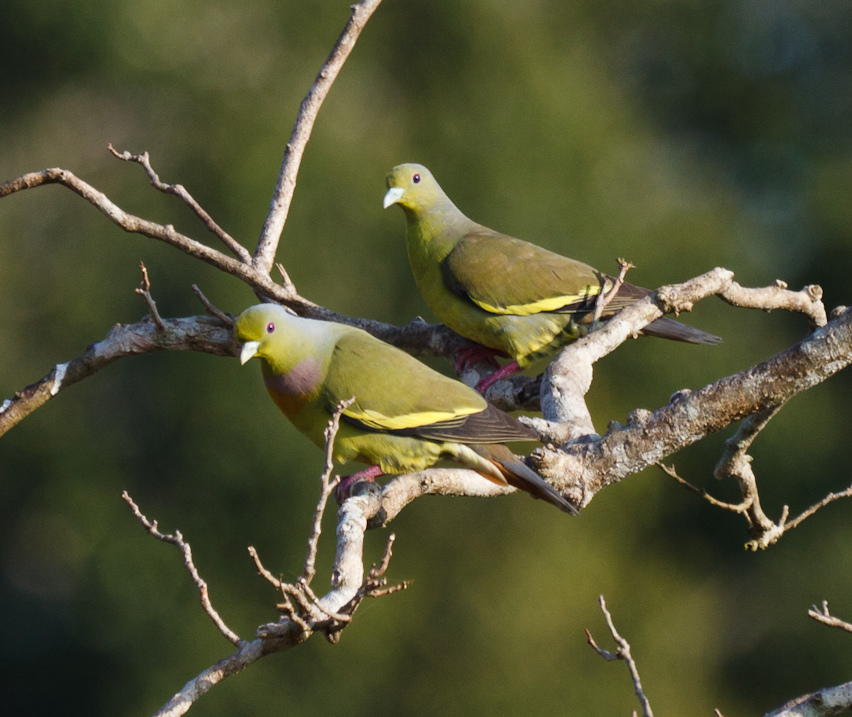
Orange-breasted green pigeon

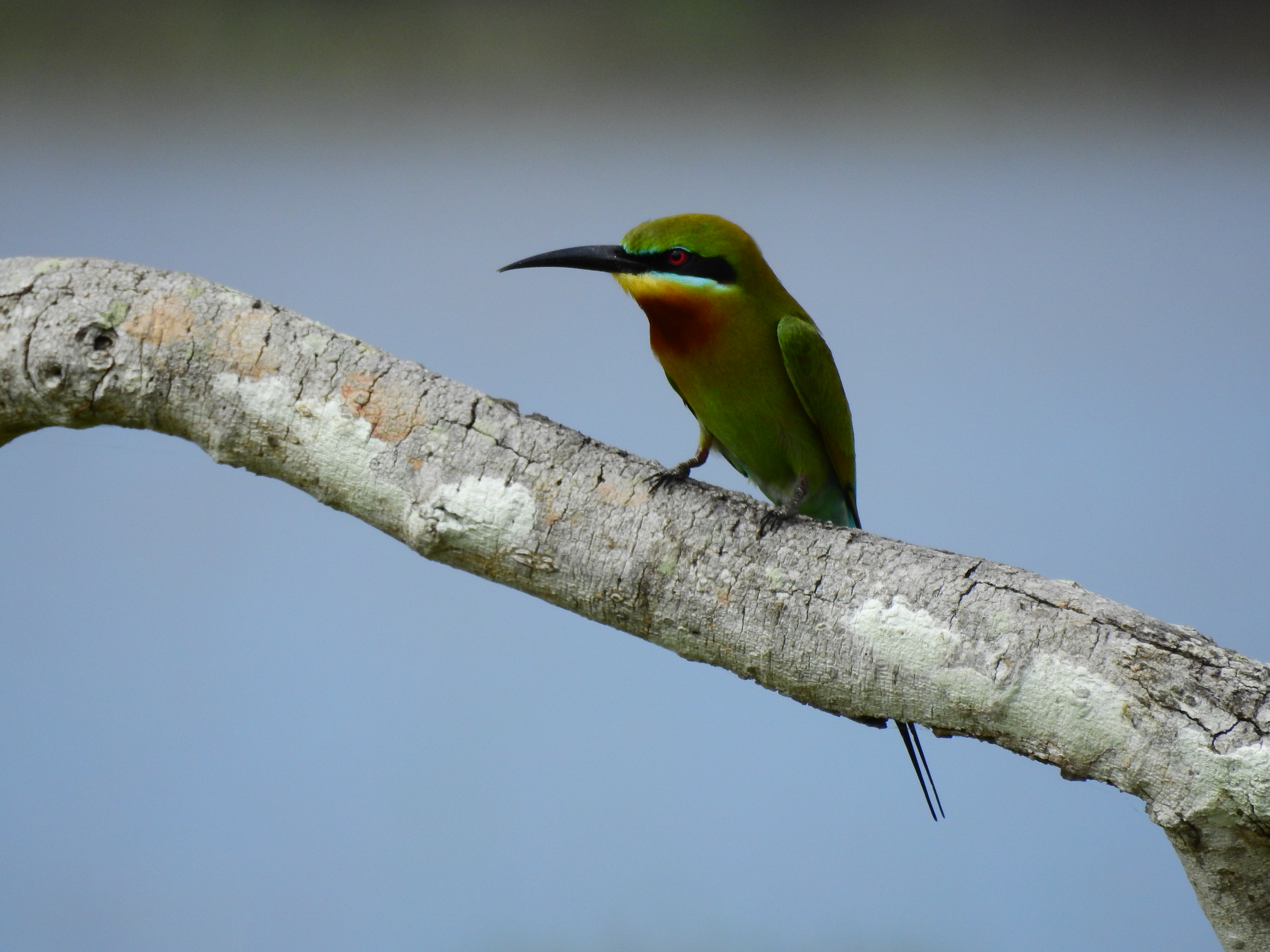
Blue-tailed bee-eater

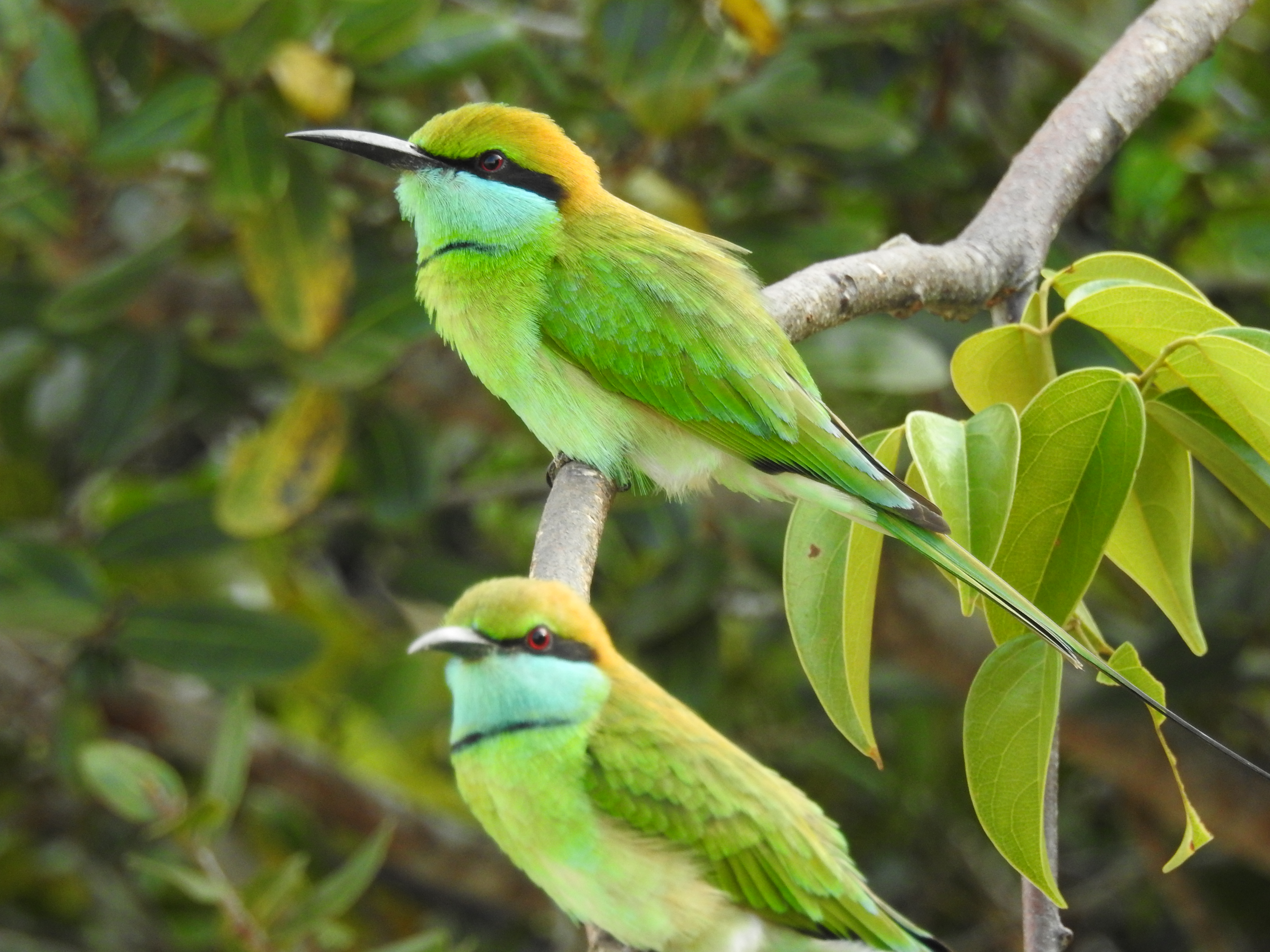
Asian green bee-eater

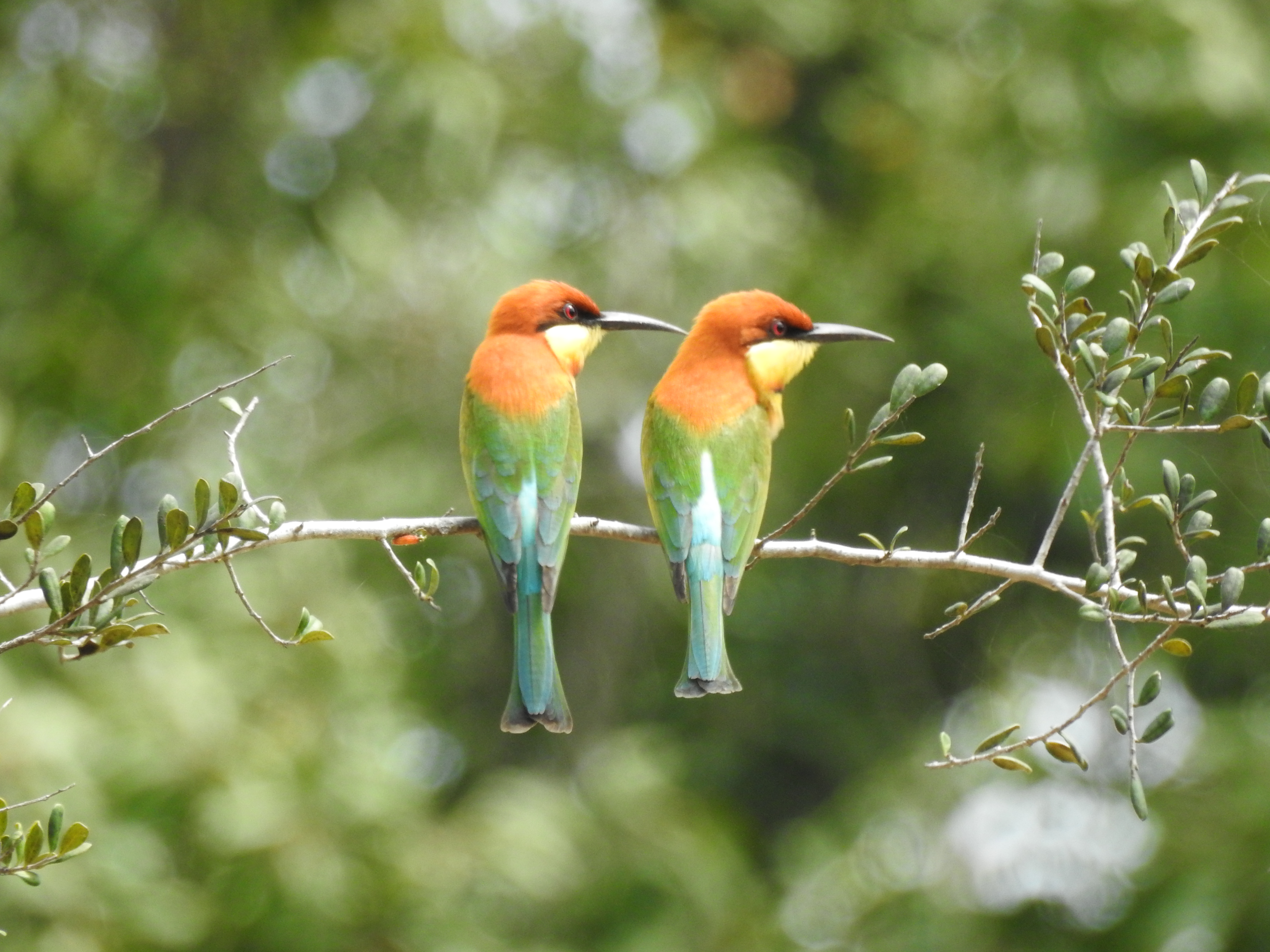
Chestnut-headed bee-eater

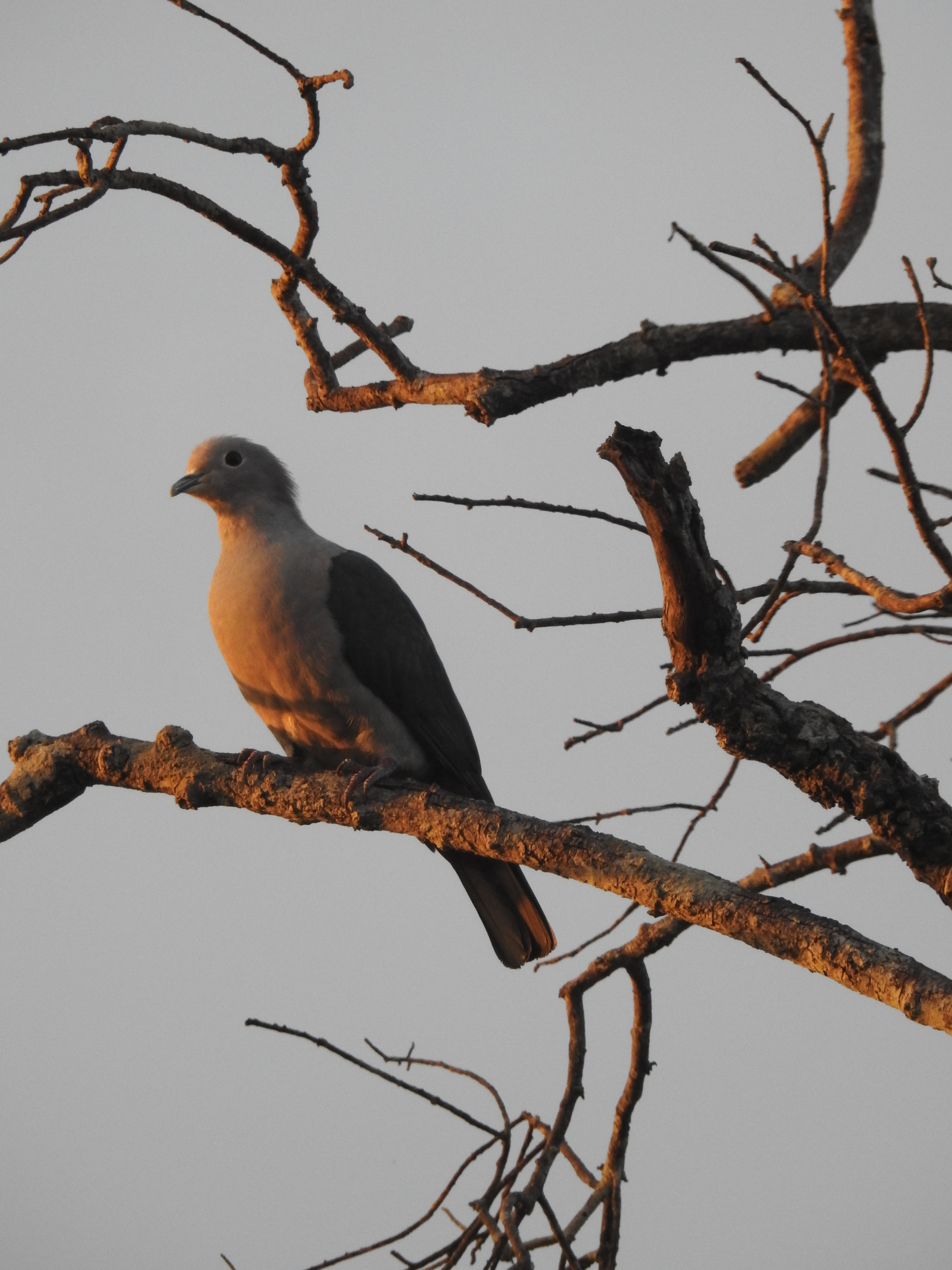
Green imperial pigeon

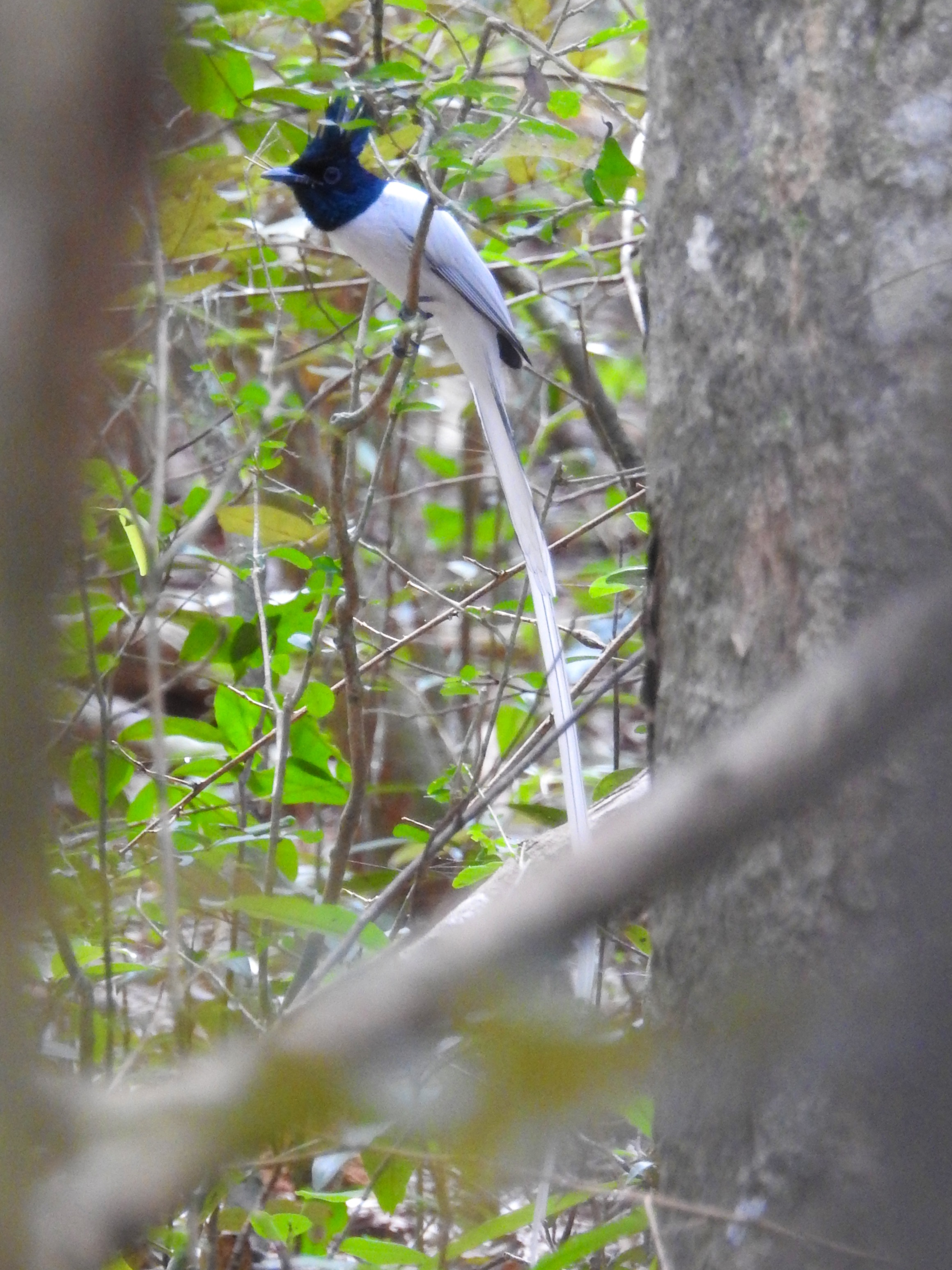
Indian paradise flycatcher

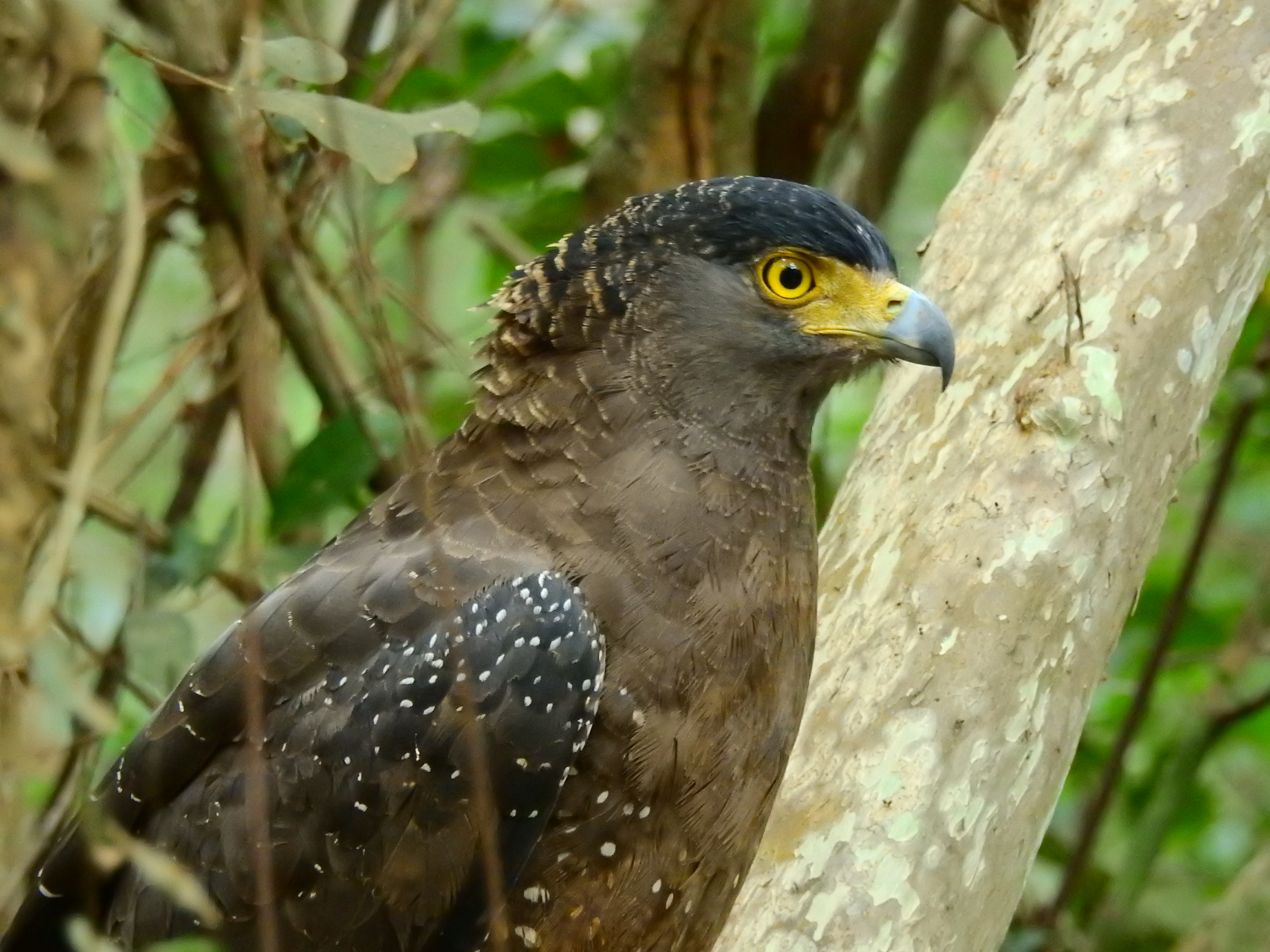
Crested serpent eagle

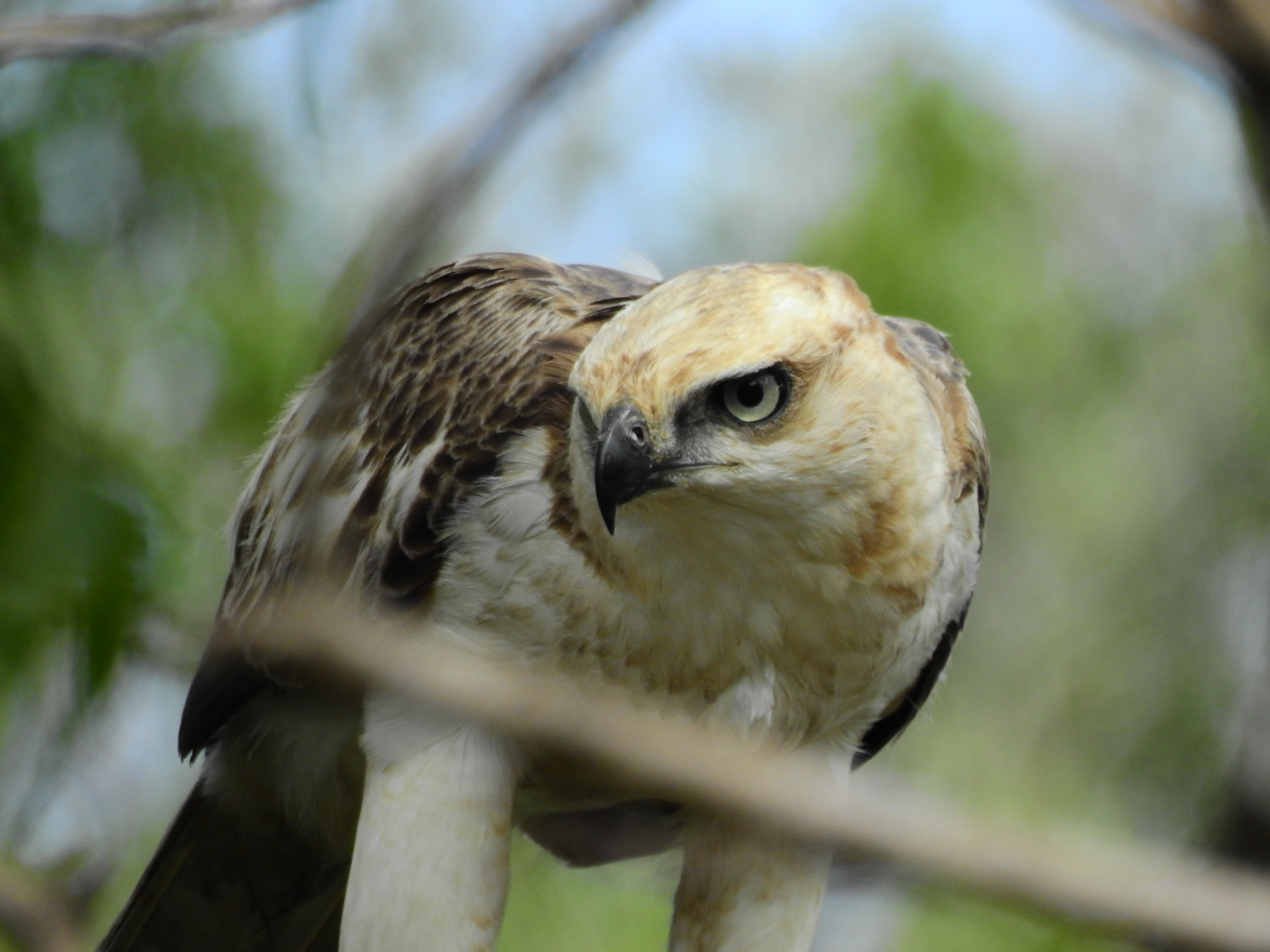
Changeable hawk-eagle

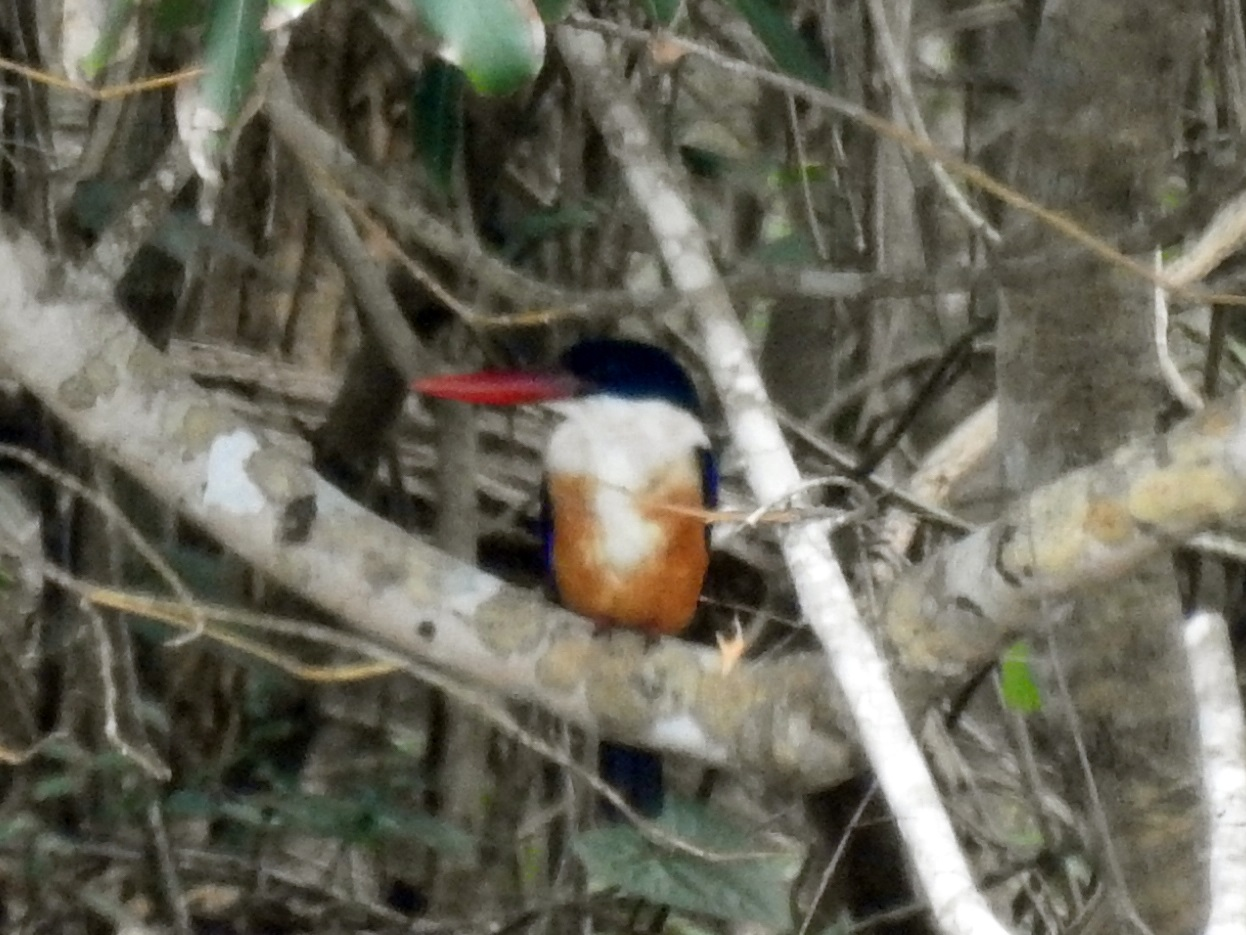
Black-capped kingfisher

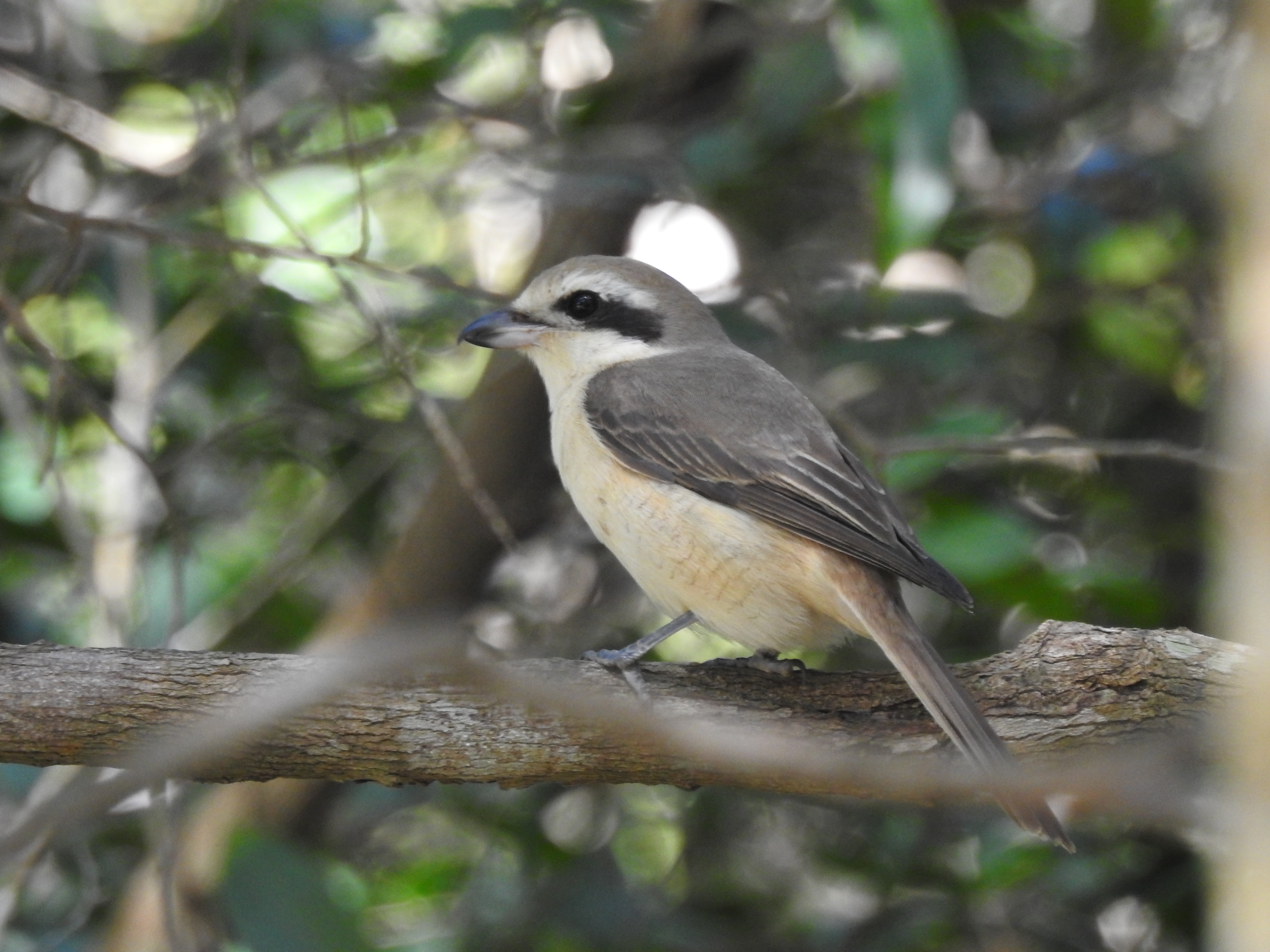
Brown shrike

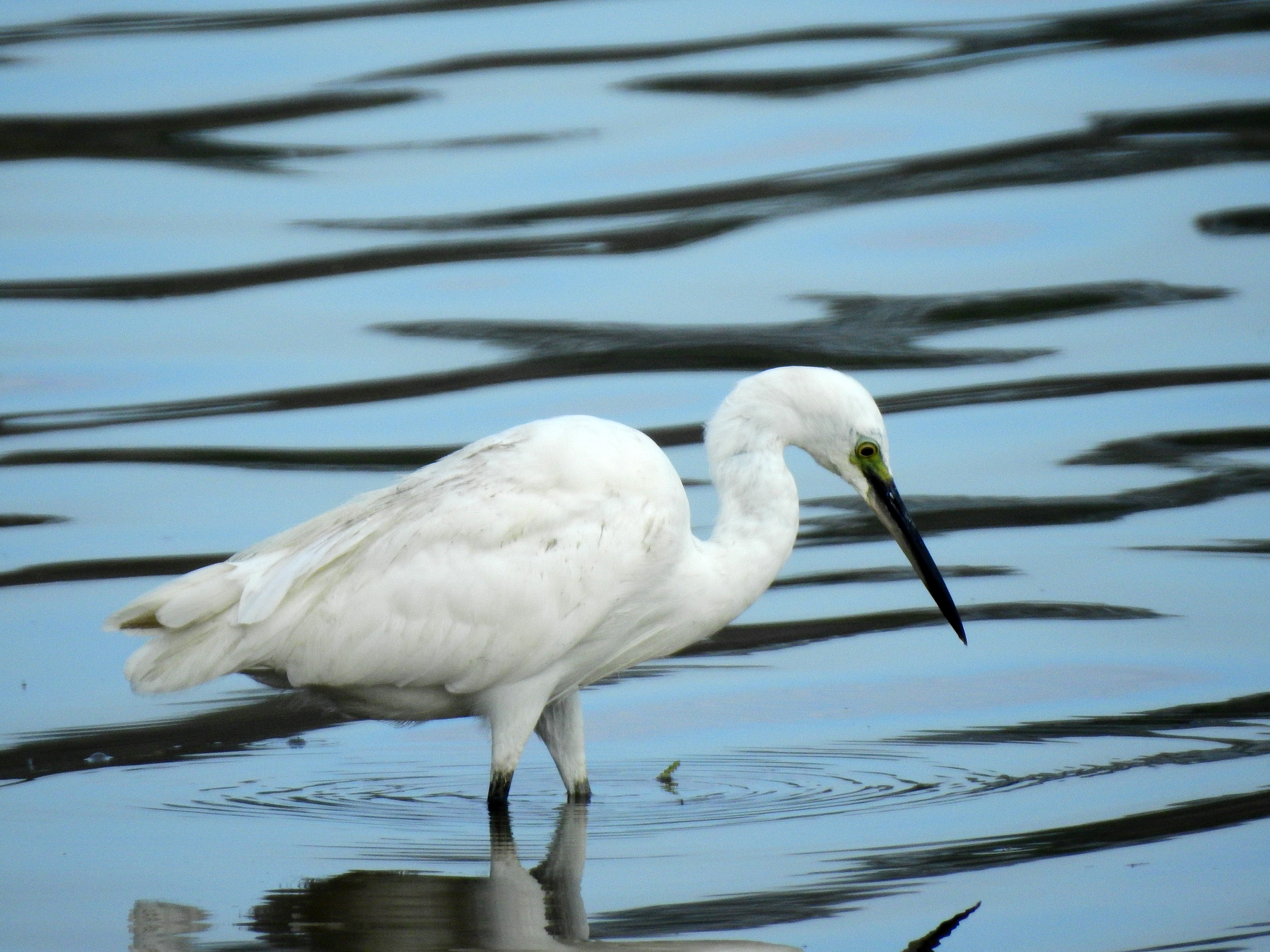
Cattle egret

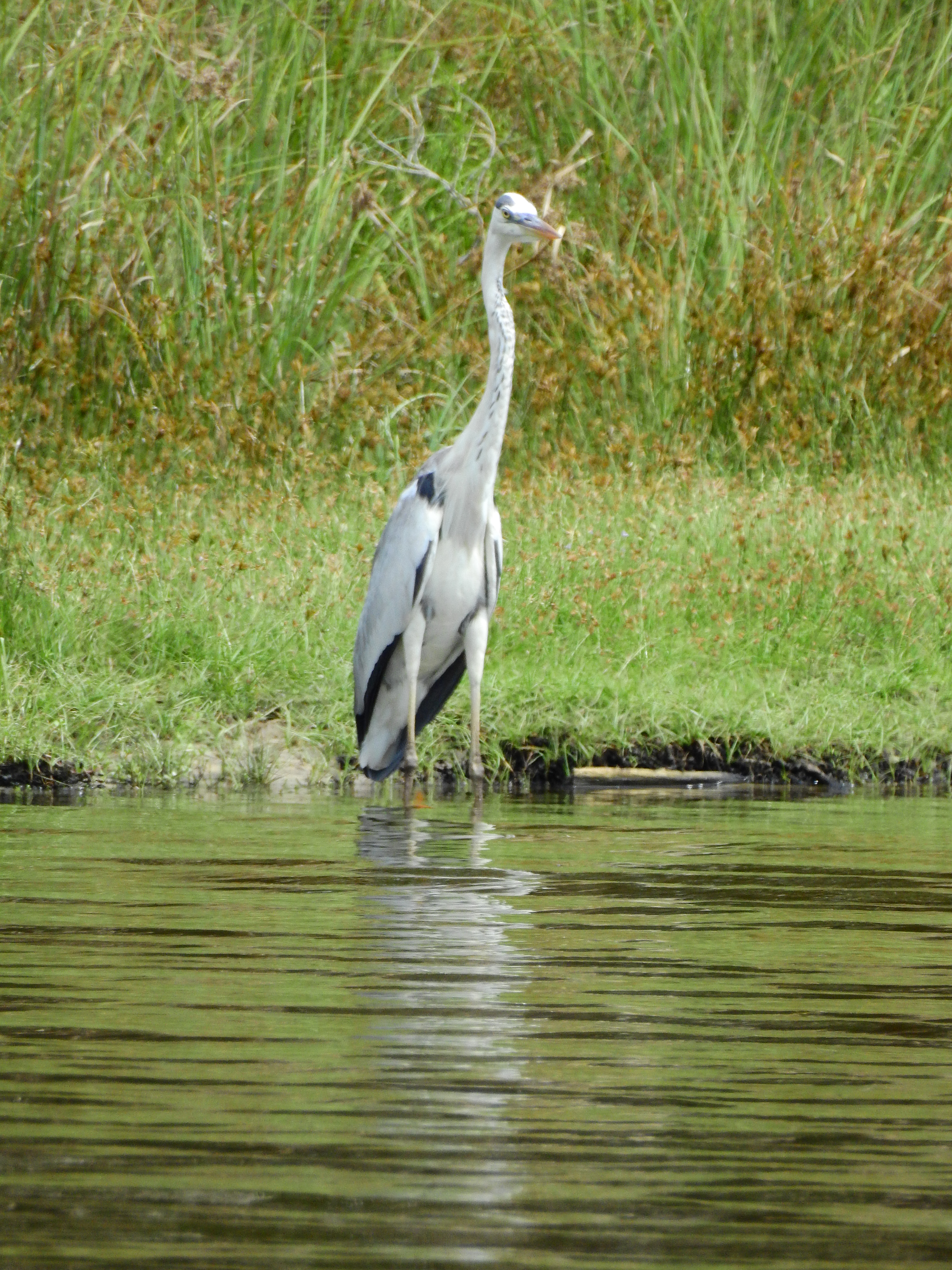
Grey heron

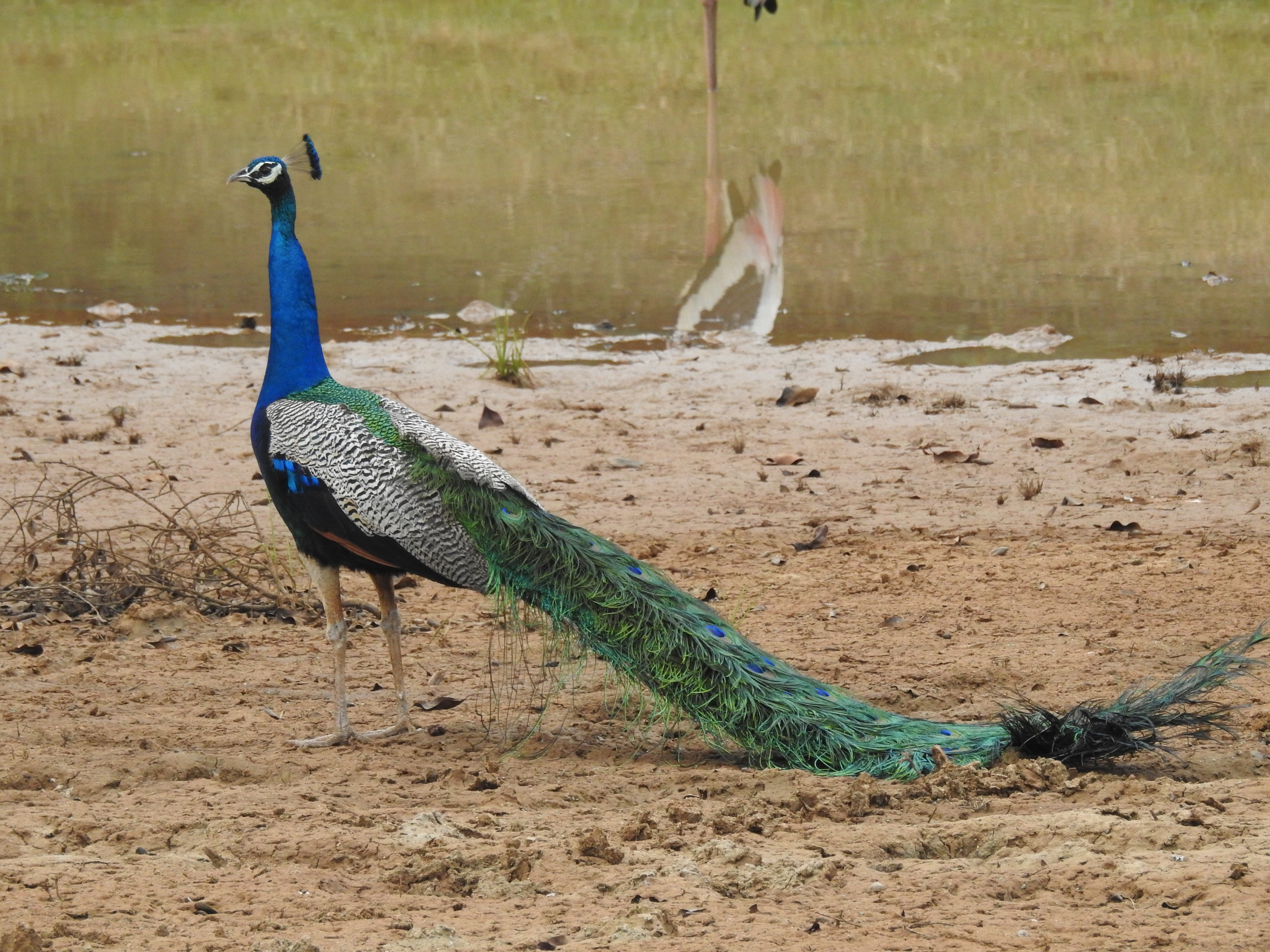
Indian peafowl

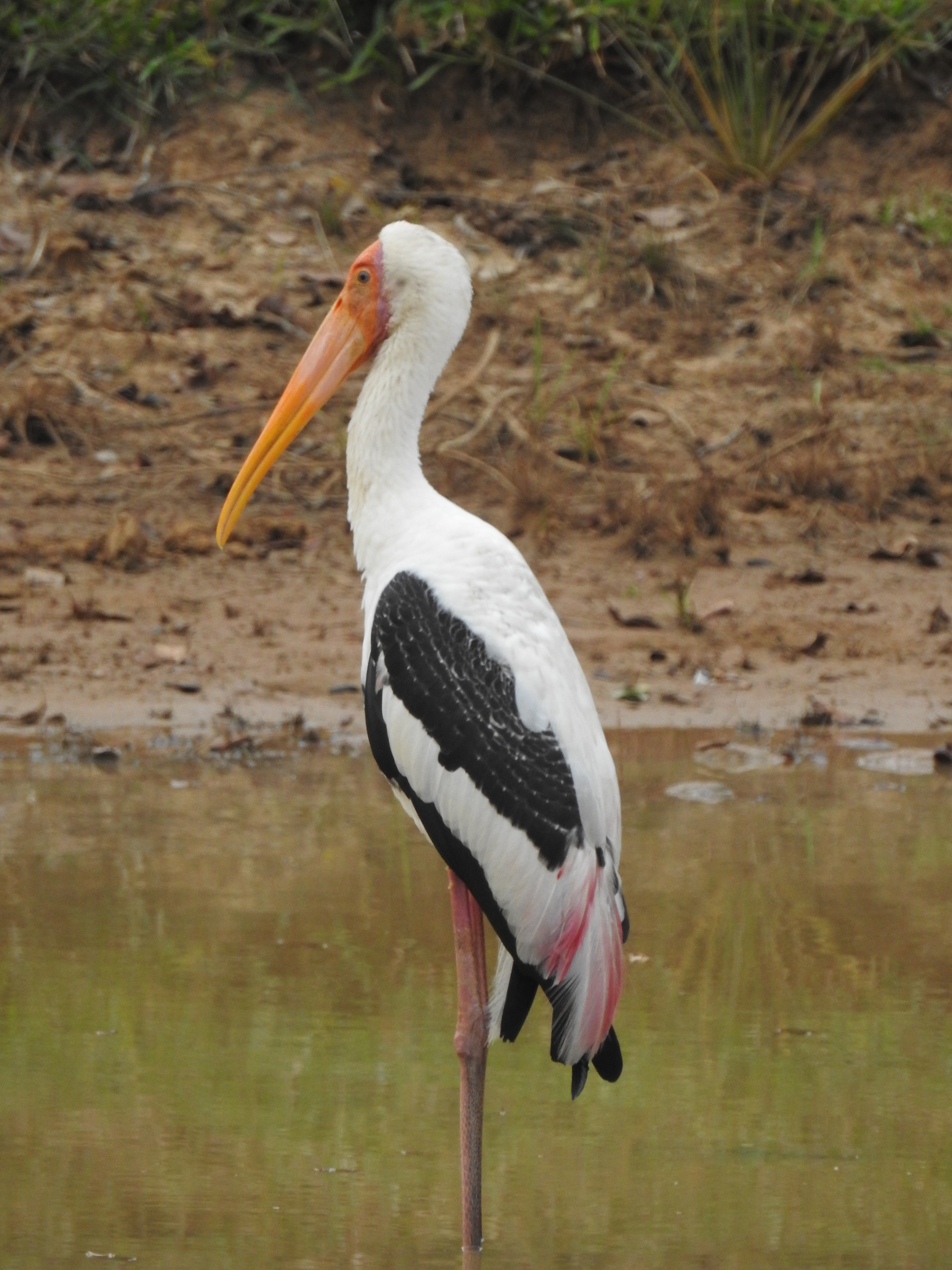
Painted stork

=== Reptiles ===
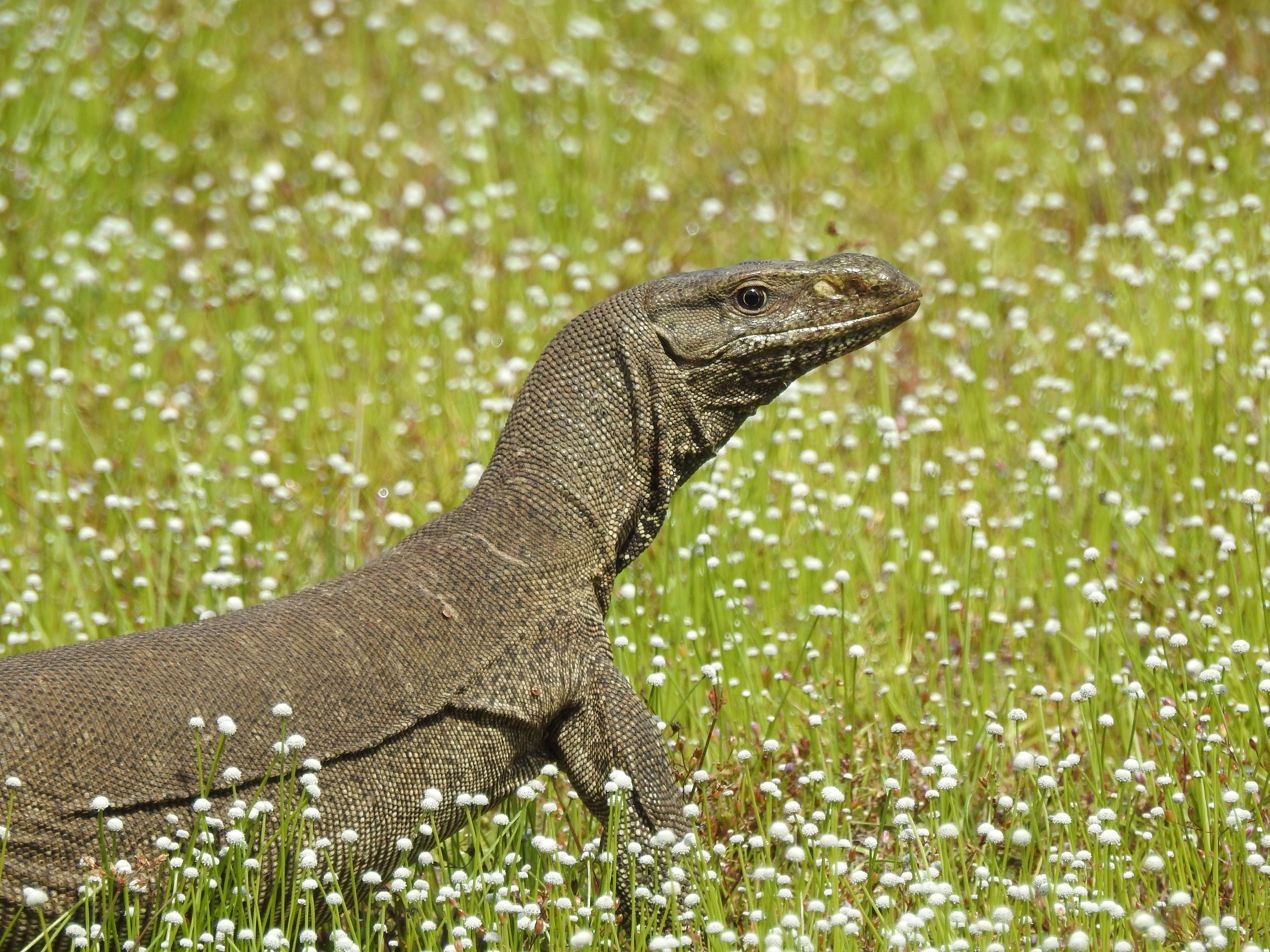
Bengal monitor

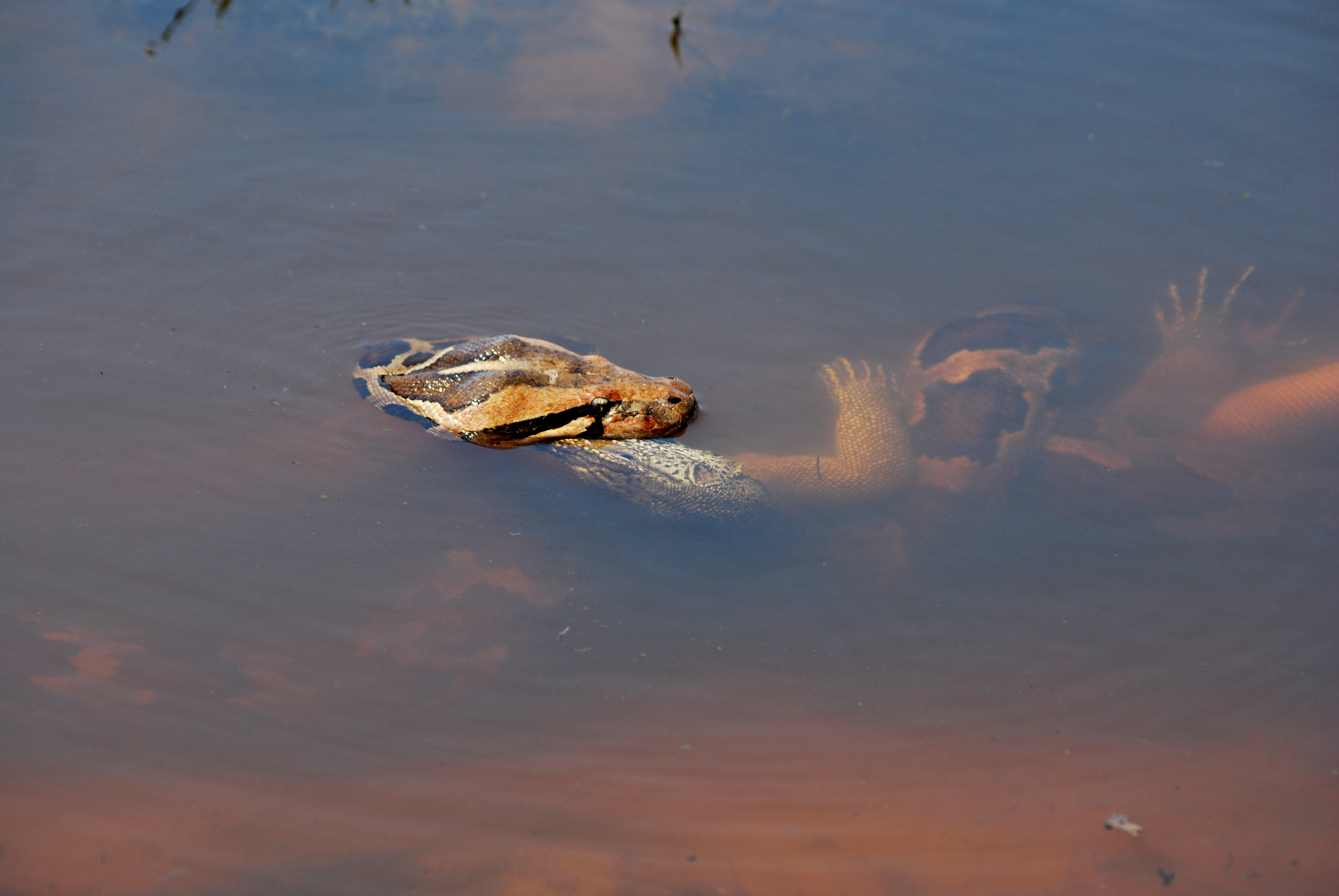
Indian rock python

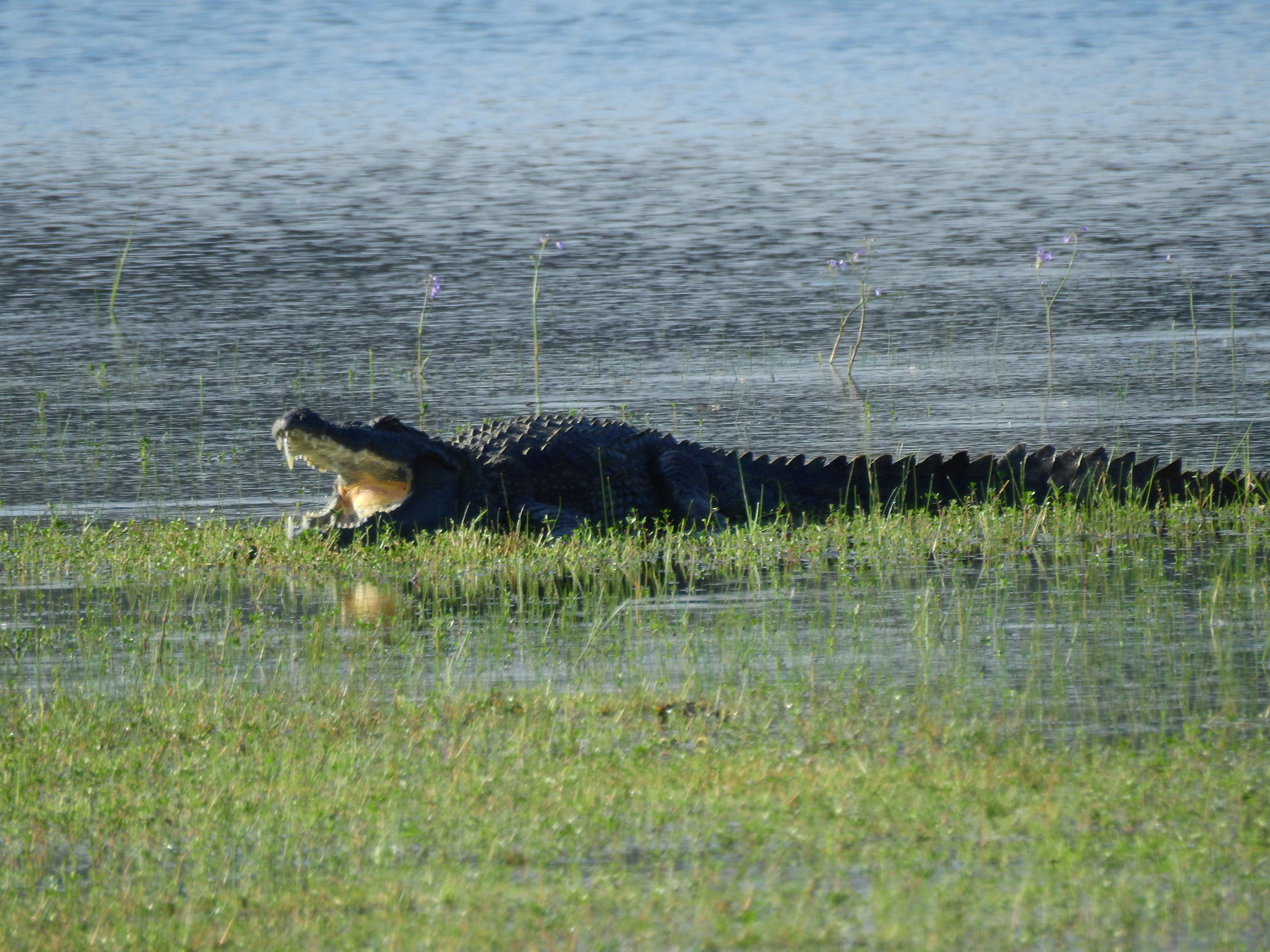
Mugger crocodile

=== Terrestrial animals ===
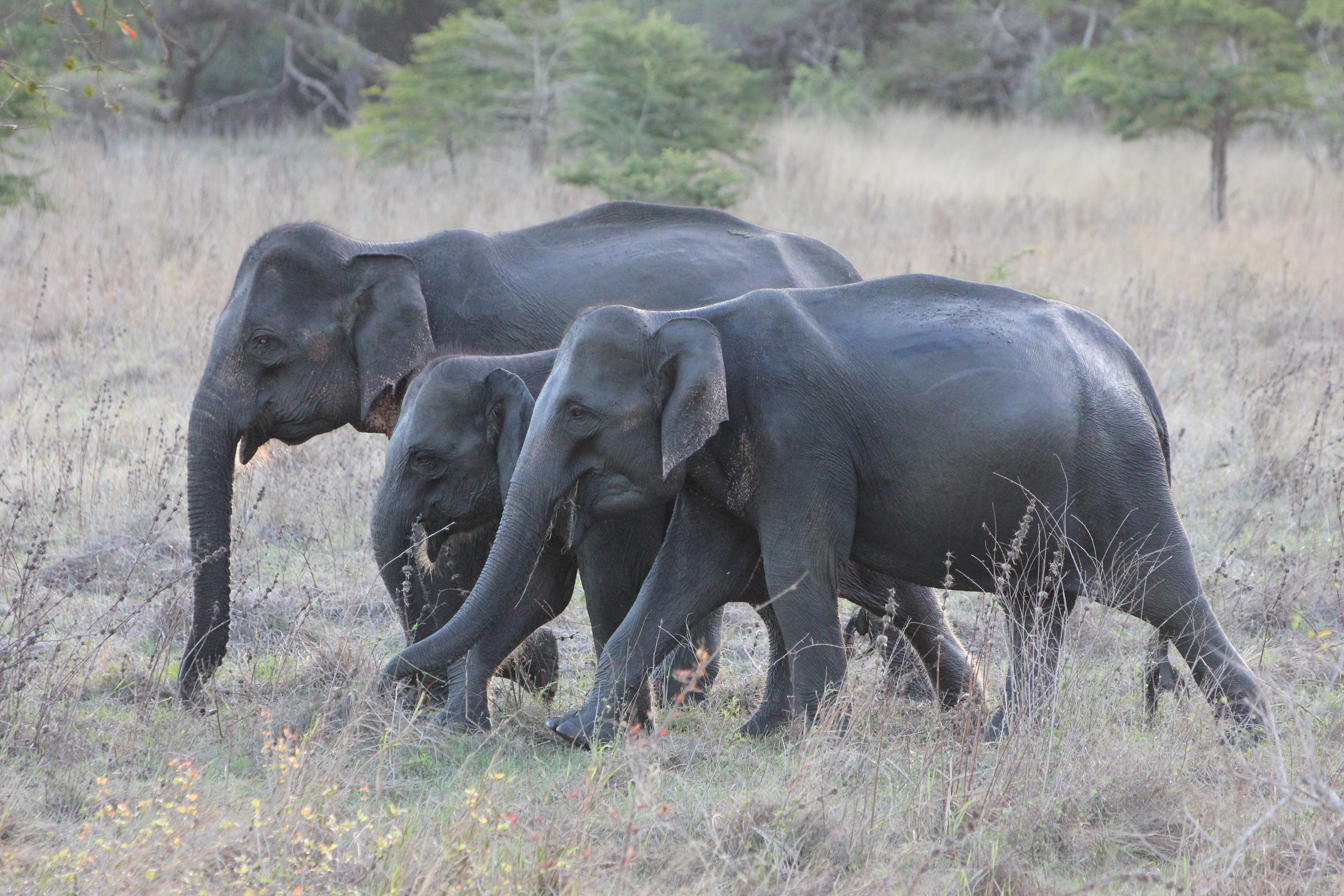
Sri Lankan elephant

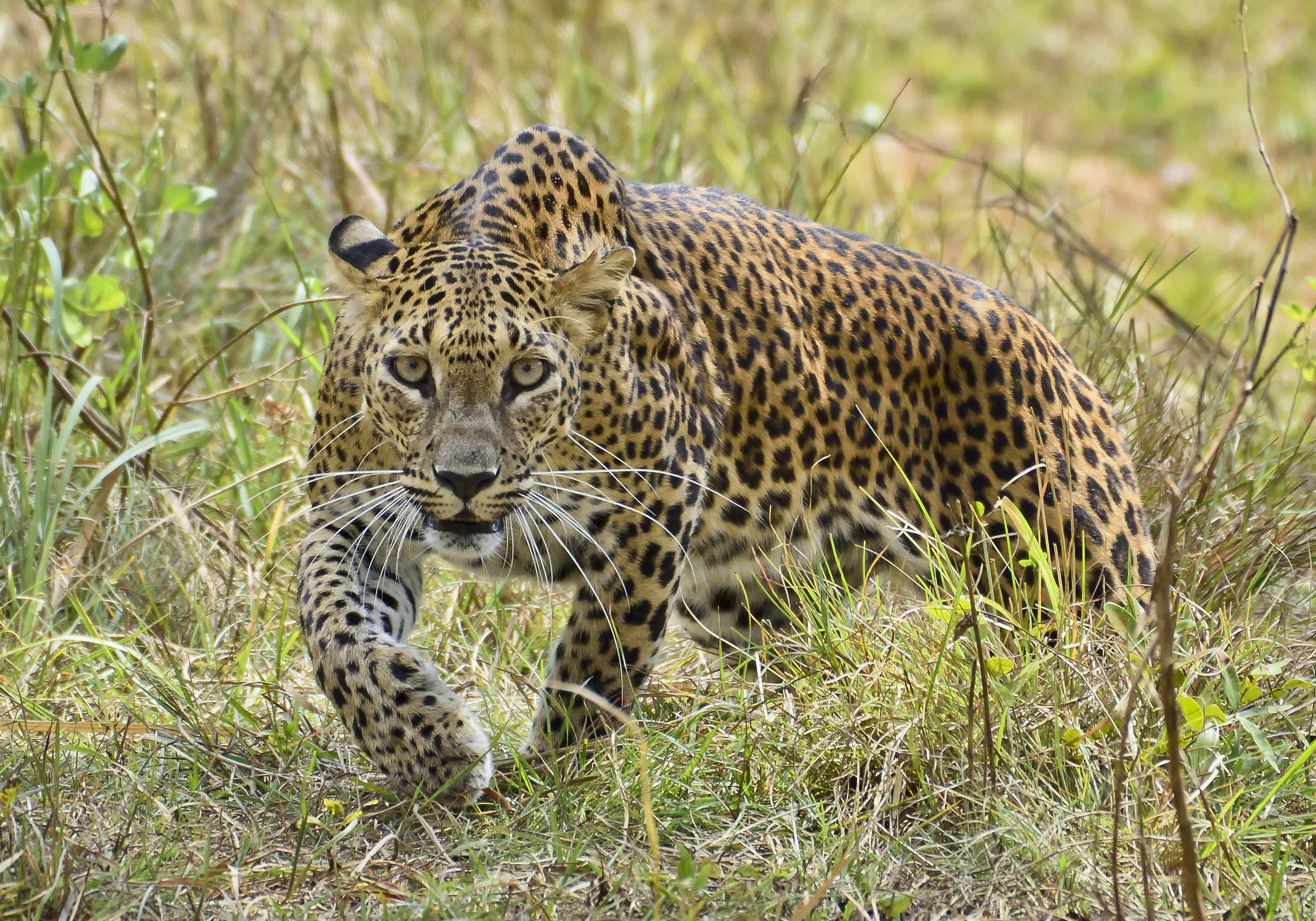
Sri Lankan leopard

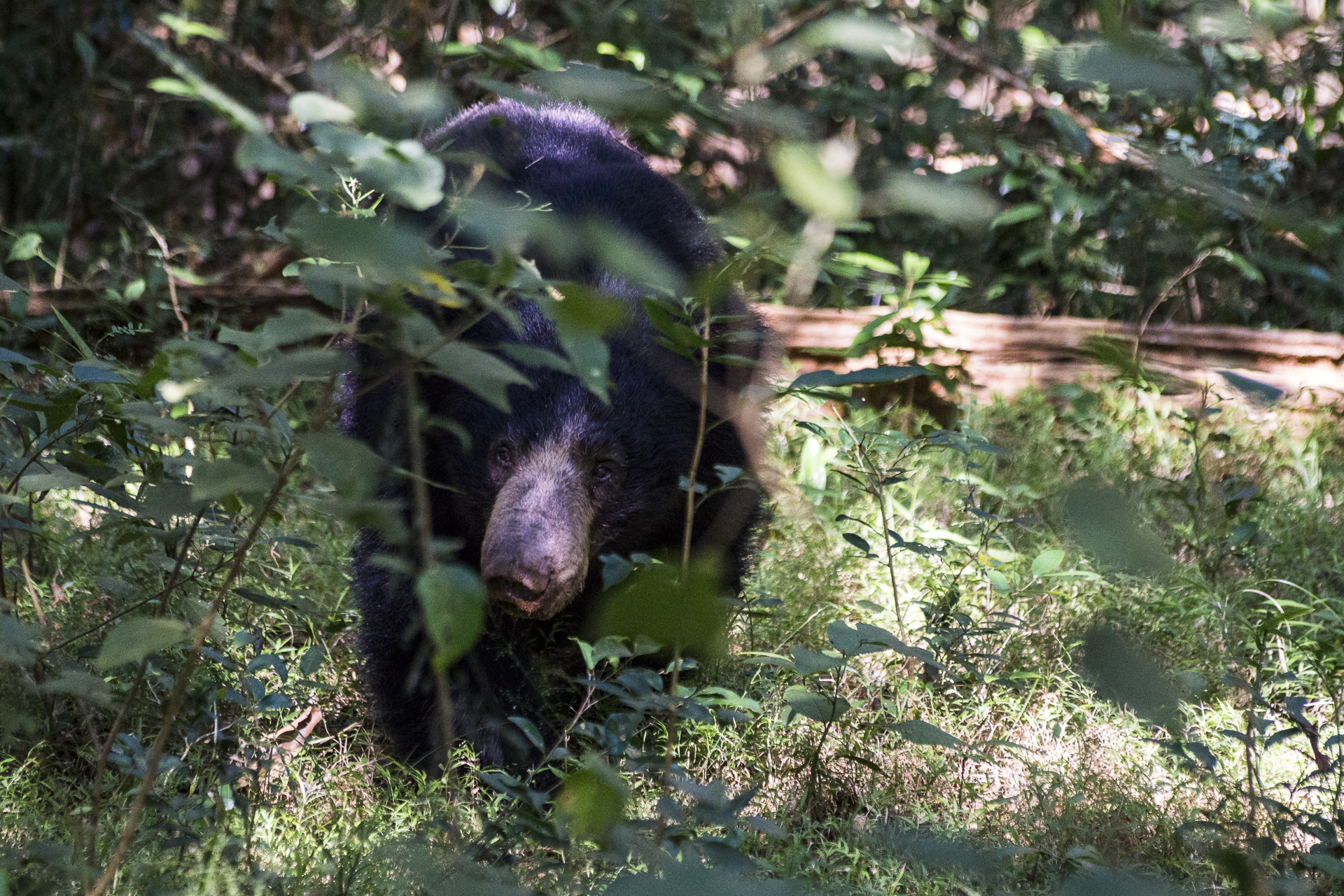
Sri Lankan sloth bear

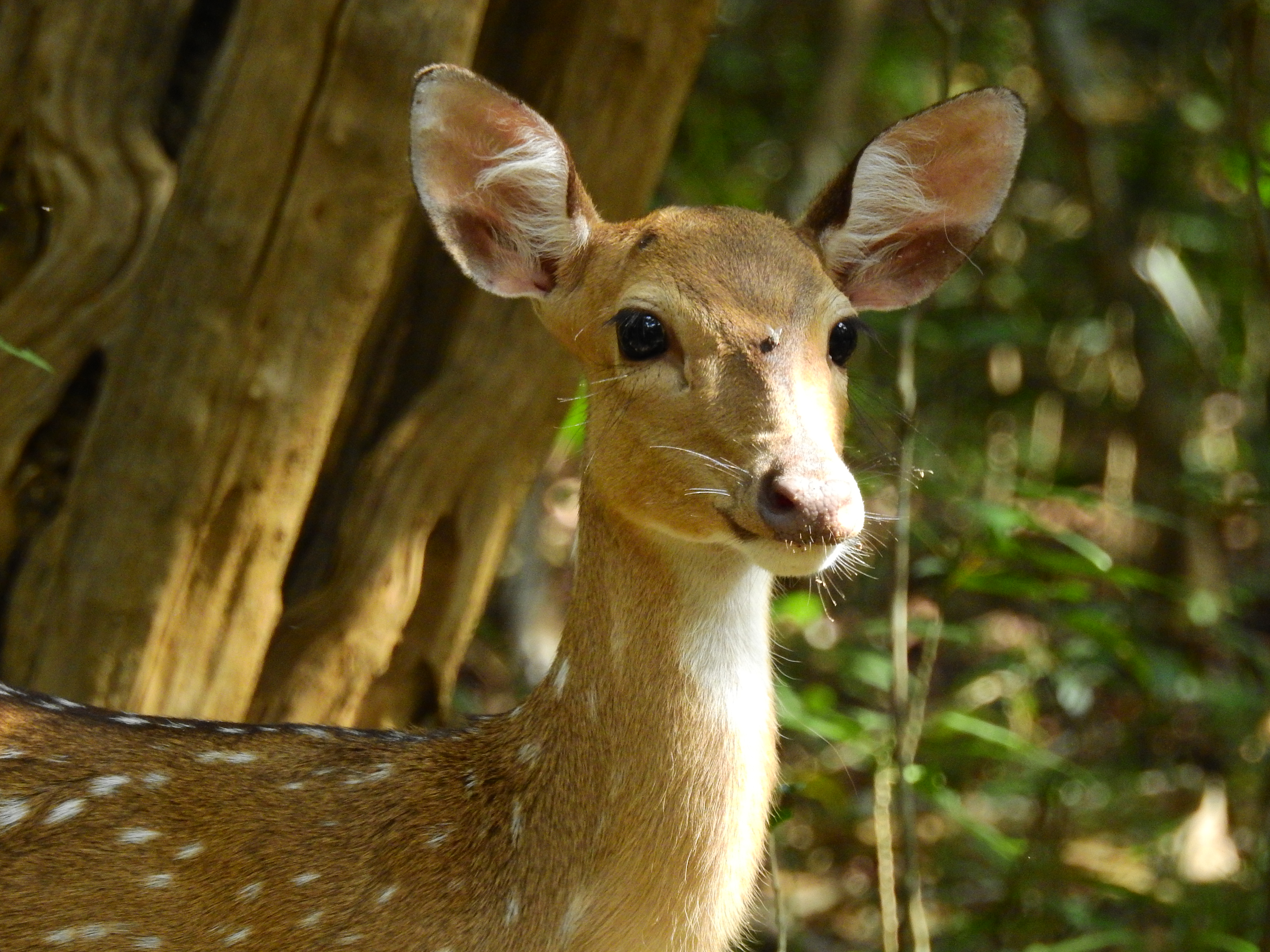
Sri Lankan axis deer

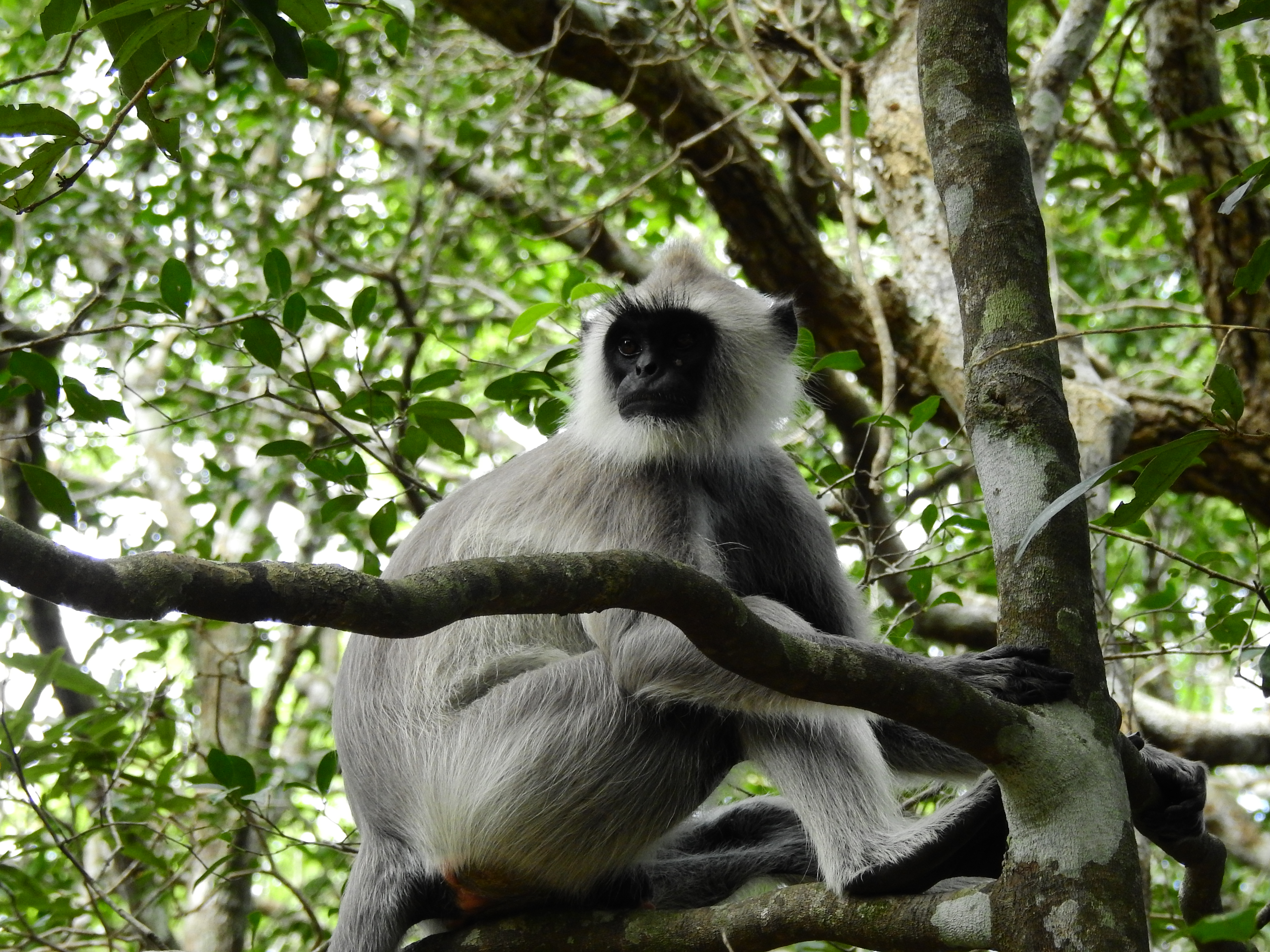
Tufted gray langur
