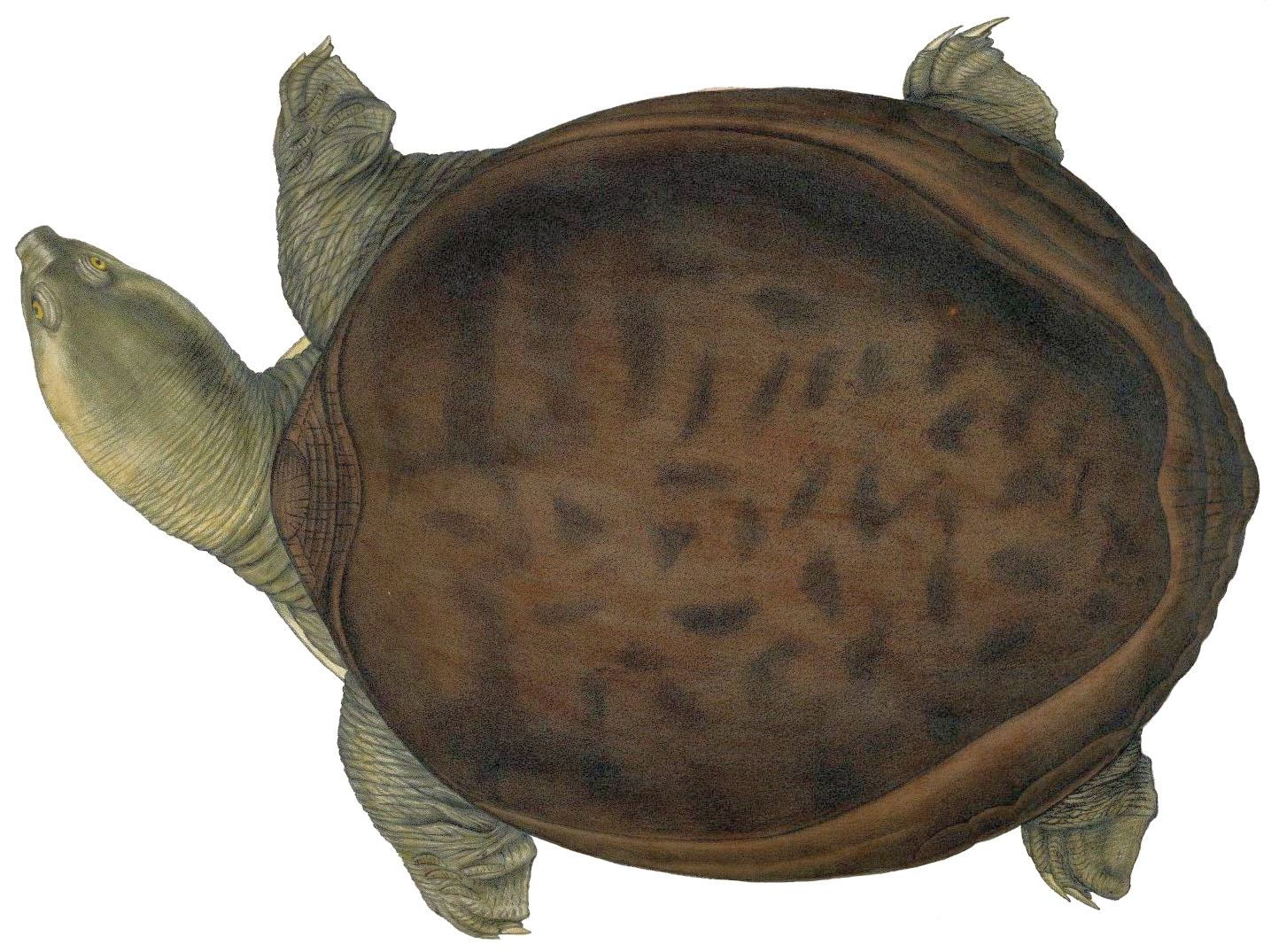

Conservation status
- Least Concern (IUCN 3.1)
- CITES Appendix II

Scientific classification
- Kingdom: Animalia
- Phylum: Chordata
- Class: Reptilia
- Order: Testudines
- Suborder: Cryptodira
- Family: Trionychidae
- Genus: Lissemys
- Species: L. scutata

Binomial name
- Lissemys scutata (W. Peters, 1868)

Synonyms
- Emyda scutata W. Peters, 1868; Emyda fuscomaculata Gray, 1873; Emyda granosa scutata — Annandale, 1912; Lissemys punctata scutata — M.A. Smith, 1931; Trionyx punctatus scutatus — Mertens, L. Müller & Rust, 1934; Lissemys scutata — Webb, 1982

= Burmese flapshell turtle =

Species of turtle

The Burmese flapshell turtle (Lissemys scutata), is a species in the family Trionychidae. The species is endemic to Asia.

== Taxonomy ==
Some experts (M.A. Smith, 1931; Mertens, L. Müller & Rust, 1934) considered L. scutata to be a subspecies of L. punctata rather than its own species.

== Description ==
L. scutata has an olive-brown to brown carapace with some dark spotting (in juveniles) or reticulations (in adults), and the first peripheral is smaller than the second. The head is olive to brown with an indistinct dark stripe extending backward from each orbit and another passing backward between the orbits.

== Distribution and habitat ==
L. scutata lives in the Irrawaddy and Salween rivers of Myanmar, the vicinities of Bhamo, Pathein, Chauk, Yangon, Bago, and Mawlamyine in Myanmar, northeastern Thailand, and possibly in Yunnan Province, China (Kuchling, 1995).

== Ecology and behavior ==
=== Diet ===
The Burmese flapshell turtle is a piscivore.

=== Life cycle ===
L. scutata reproduces sexually. It is oviparous.

== Conservation ==
Although the Burmese flapshell turtle is listed as Least Concern, some speculate it may be Vulnerable as it is traded in large numbers in East Asian food markets. However, not enough research has been done to come to a conclusion on this species' conservation status.
