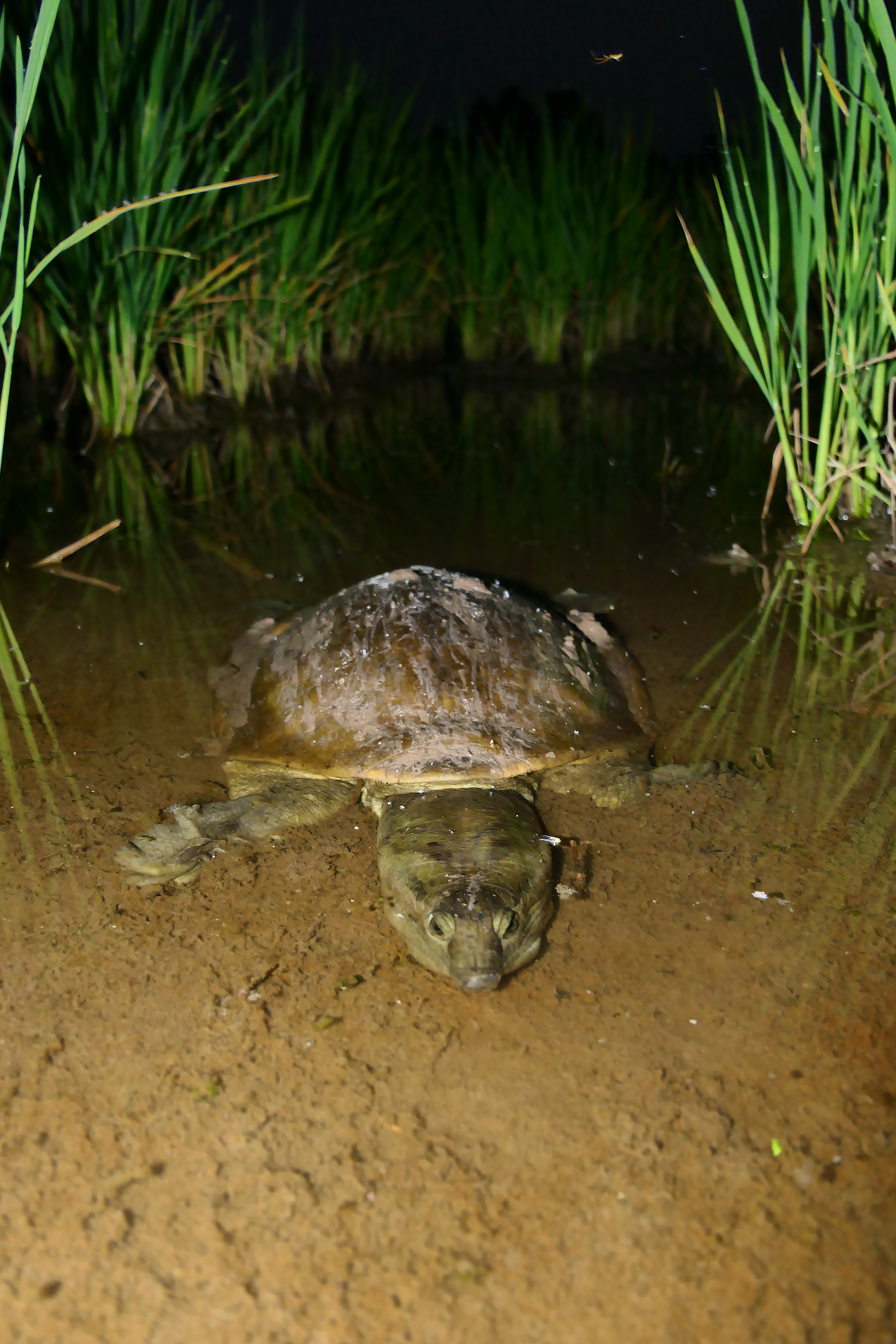

Conservation status
- CITES Appendix II (CITES)

Scientific classification
- Domain: Eukaryota
- Kingdom: Animalia
- Phylum: Chordata
- Class: Reptilia
- Order: Testudines
- Suborder: Cryptodira
- Family: Trionychidae
- Genus: Lissemys
- Species: L. ceylonensis

Binomial name
- Lissemys ceylonensis (Gray, 1856)

Synonyms
- List: Emyda ceylonensis Gray 1856; Emyda granosa Boulenger 1889 partim; Emyda granosa ceylonensis Annandale 1912; Lissemys punctata granosa Smith 1931; Lissemys ceylonensis Praschag et al. 2011; Lissemys ceylonensis Karunarathna & Amarasinghe 2011; Lissemys ceylonensis TTWG 2014

= Lissemys ceylonensis =

Species of turtle

Lissemys ceylonensis, commonly known as the Sri Lankan flapshell turtle, is a species of freshwater turtle endemic to Sri Lanka.

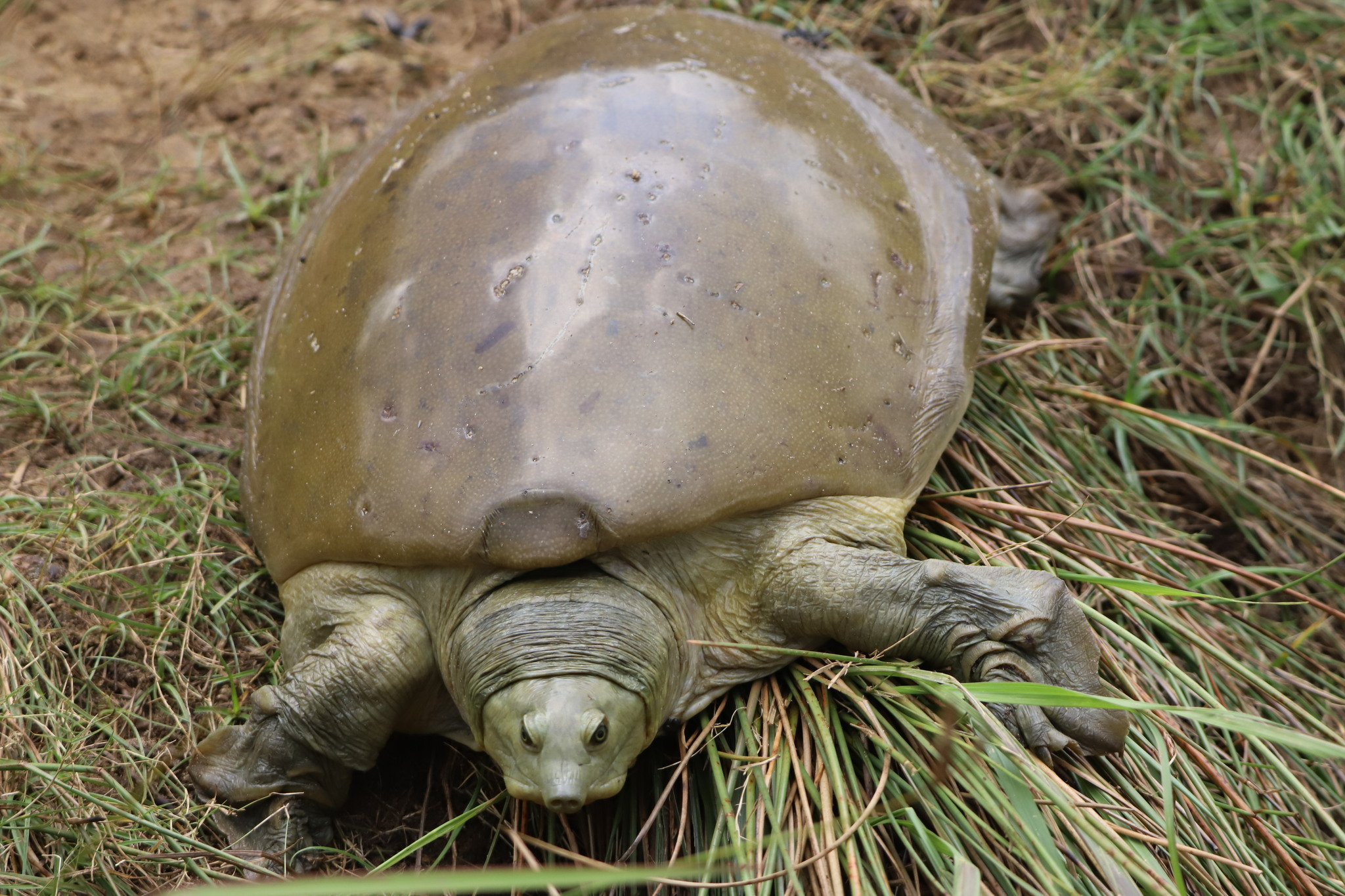

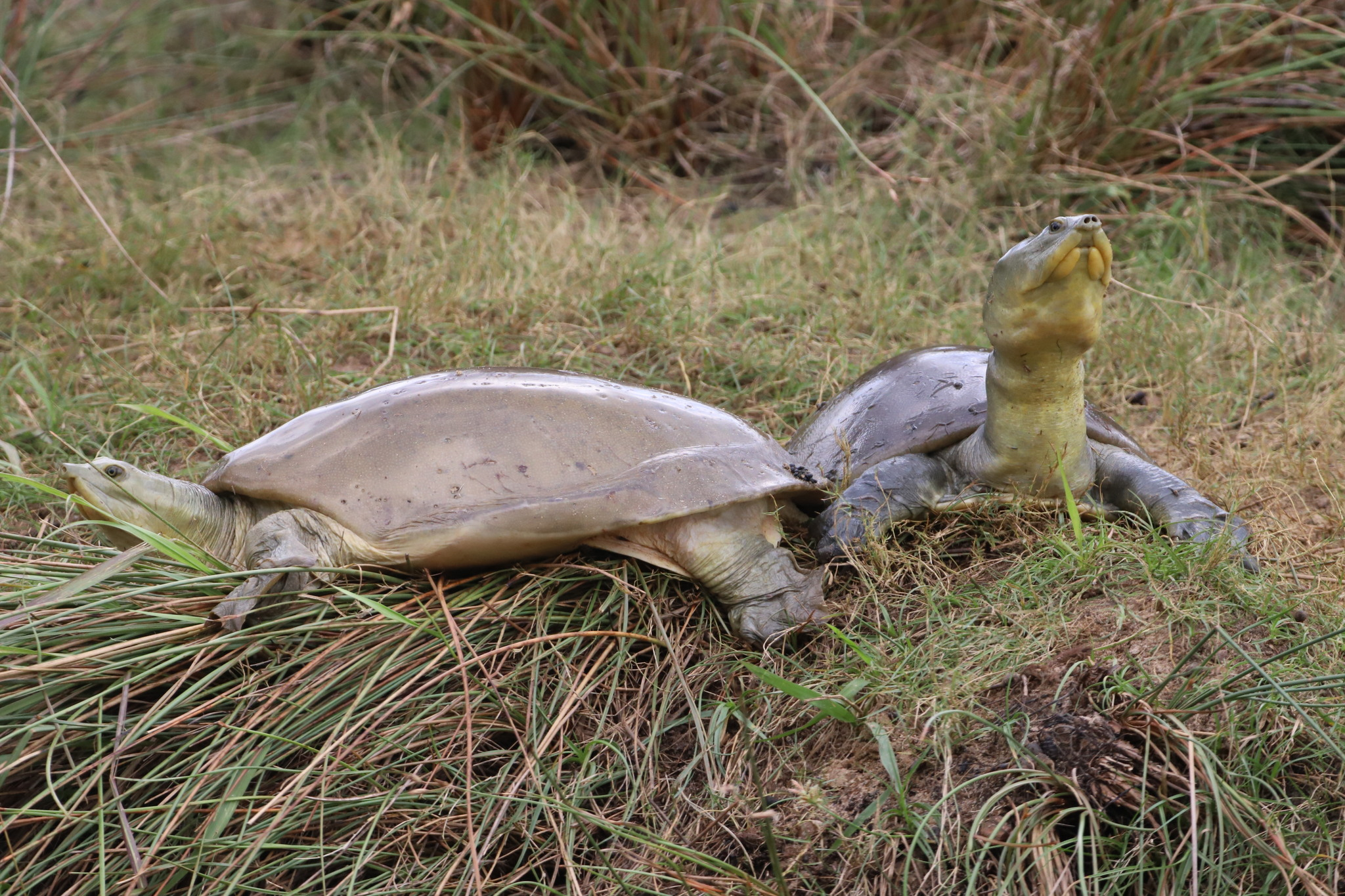

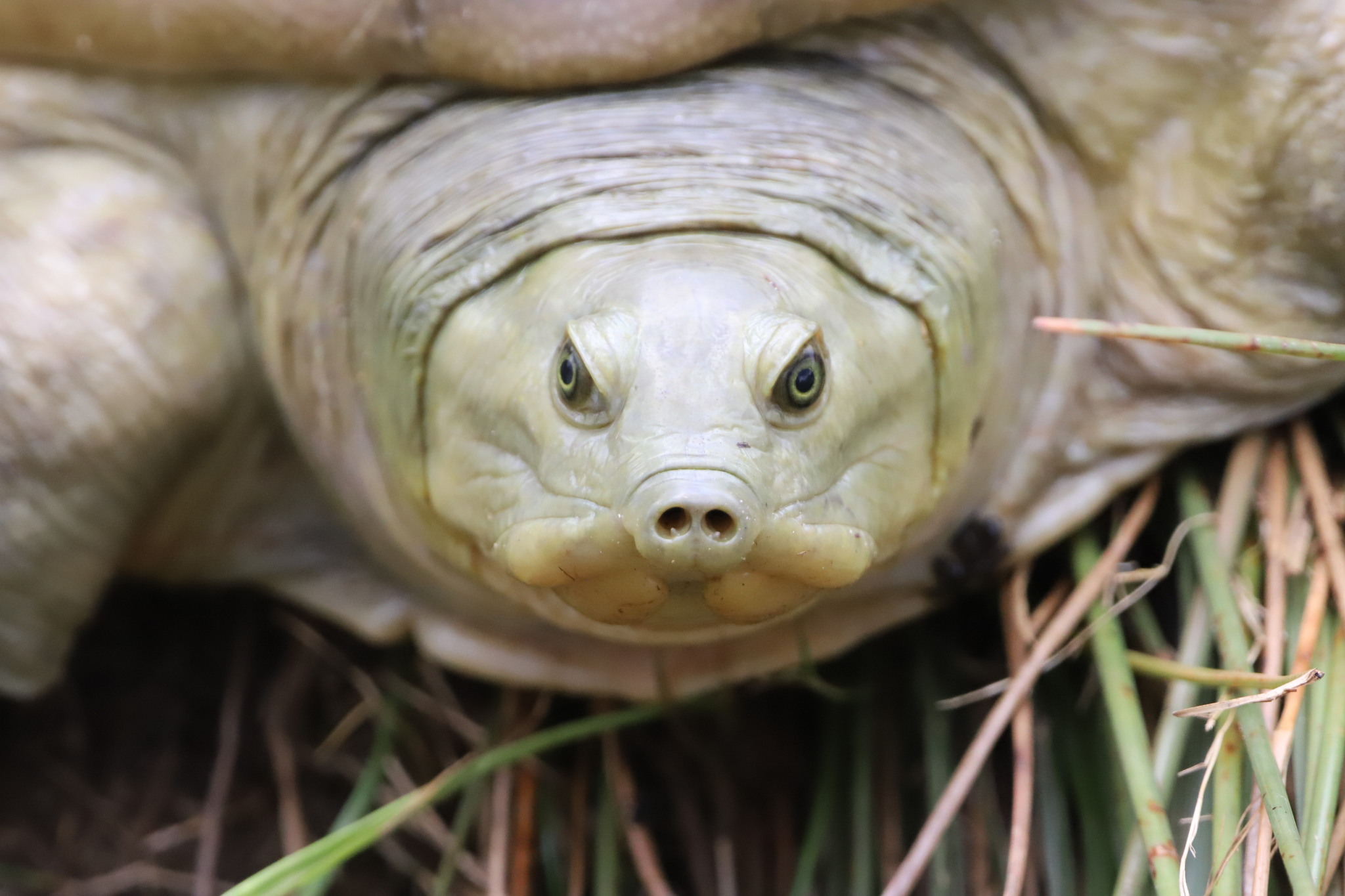
