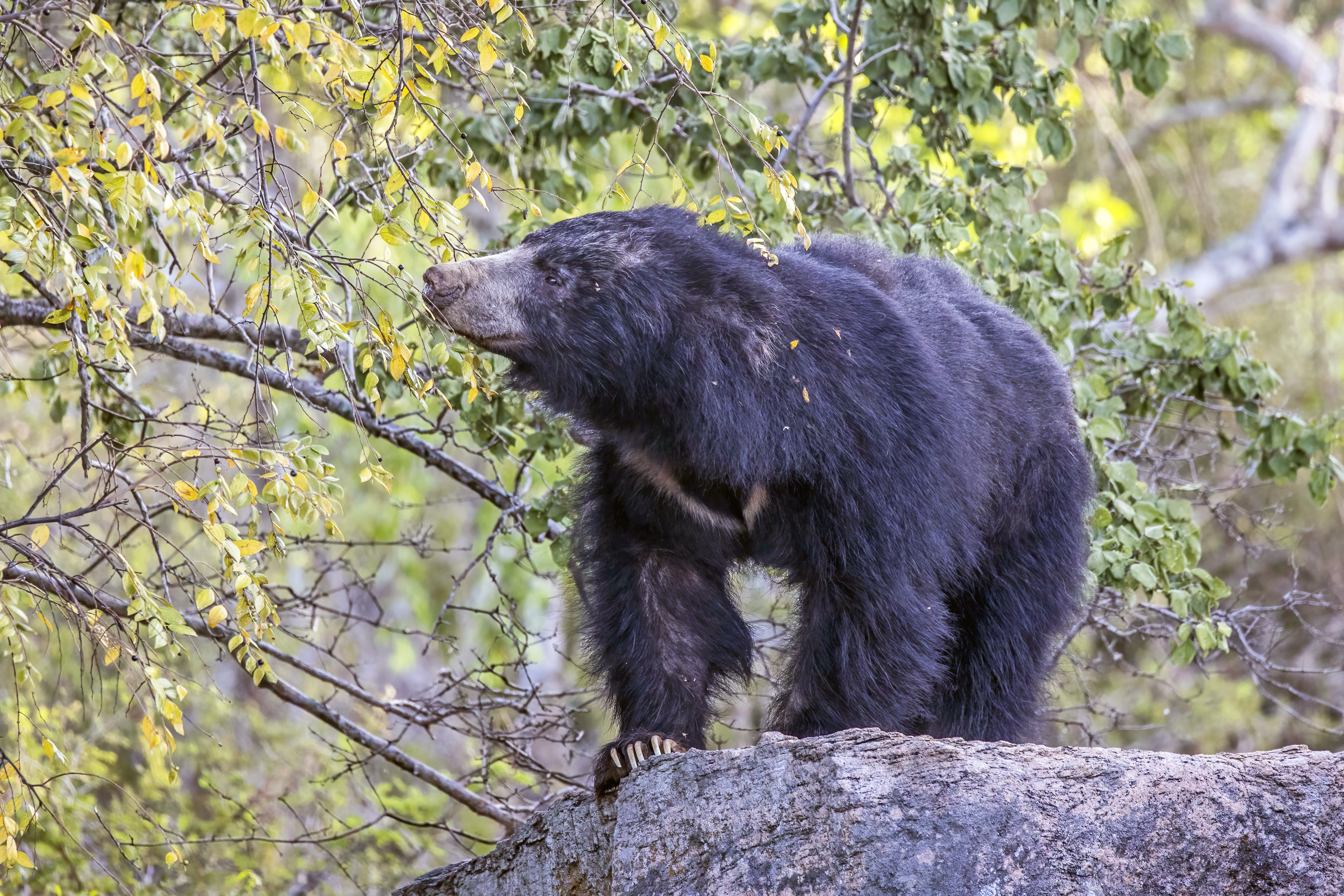
- Male in Yala National Park

Conservation status
- Endangered (IUCN 3.1)

Scientific classification
- Kingdom: Animalia
- Phylum: Chordata
- Class: Mammalia
- Order: Carnivora
- Family: Ursidae
- Genus: Melursus
- Species: M. ursinus
- Subspecies: M. u. inornatus

Trinomial name
- Melursus ursinus inornatus Pucheran, 1855

= Sri Lankan sloth bear =

Subspecies of carnivore

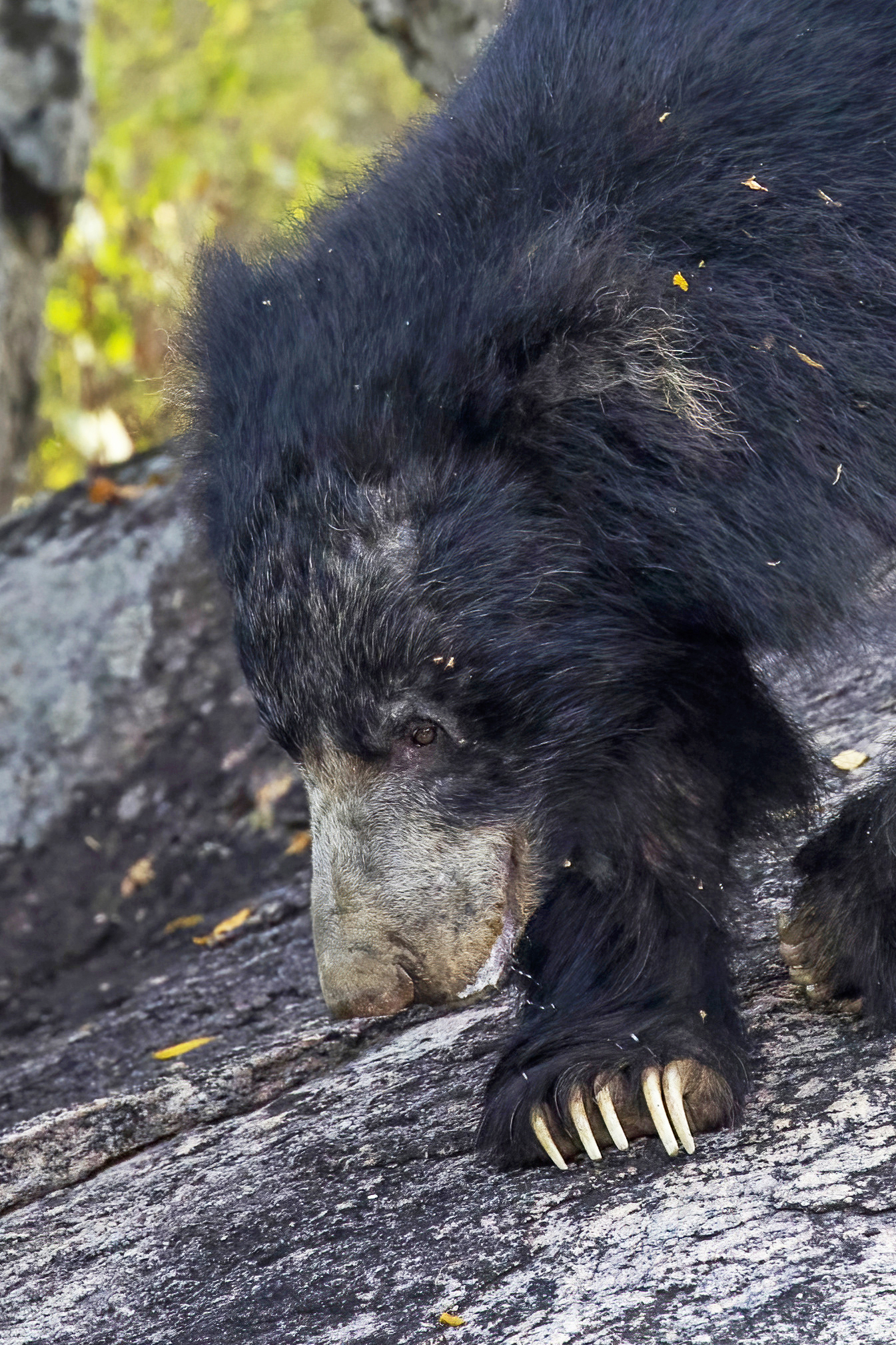
In Yala National Park

The Sri Lankan sloth bear (Melursus ursinus inornatus) is a subspecies of the sloth bear which is found mainly in lowland dry forests in the island of Sri Lanka.

== Ecology ==
Being omnivorous, it feeds on nuts, berries, and roots, as well as carrion and meat. One of its main staples is insects, which it removes from rotting stumps and trees with its long, hairless snout. Otherwise, it rarely kills animals.

== Conservation status ==
The Sri Lankan sloth bear is highly threatened, with a population less than 1000 (the wild population may be as few as 500) in many isolated populations with population decrease. Destruction of dry-zone natural forest is its main threat because unlike other large Sri Lankan animals, the Sri Lankan sloth bear is highly dependent on natural forests for its food source. An increase in sloth bear-human interaction has also caused many conflicts. These conflicts include death and injury to humans, livestock loss, damage to property, and retaliatory killing of wildlife causing humans to fear this species.

== Cultural significance ==
In its native habitat of Sri Lanka, this bear is called the walaha in Sinhalese and karadi in Tamil. Both terms simply translate to "bear" in English.

== See also ==
- Wildlife of Sri Lanka
- Yala National Park
