= Kaudulla National Park =

National park in Sri Lanka

- IUCN category II (national park)
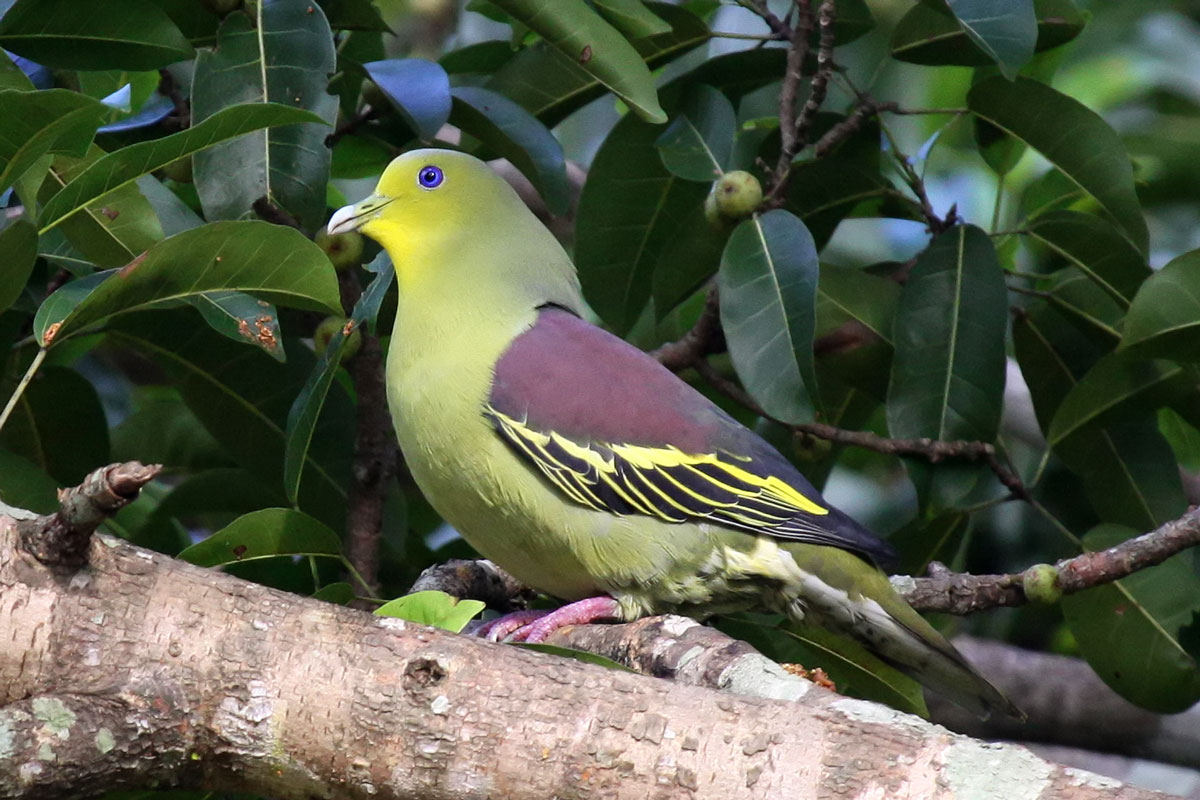
- A Sri Lanka Green Pigeon in Kaudulla National Park

- Location within Sri Lanka
- Location: North Central province, Sri Lanka
- Nearest city: Polonnaruwa
- Coordinates: 8°09′40″N 80°54′18″E
- Area: 6,900 ha (17,000 acres)
- Established: April 01, 2002
- Visitors: 10,000 (in 2005)
- Governing body: Department of Wildlife Conservation

Kaudulla National Park is a national park on the island of Sri Lanka located 197 kilometres (122 mi) away from the largest city, Colombo. It was designated a national park on April 1, 2002, becoming the 15th such area on the island. In the 2004–2005 season more than 10,000 people visited the National Park, generating an income of Rs.100,000 from entrance fees. Along with Minneriya and Girithale BirdLife International have identified Kaudulla as an Important Bird Area.

Historically Kaudulla was one of the 16 irrigation tanks built by King Mahasen. Following a period of abandonment it was reconstructed in 1959. It now attracts and supports a variety of plant and animal life, including large mammals, fish and reptiles.

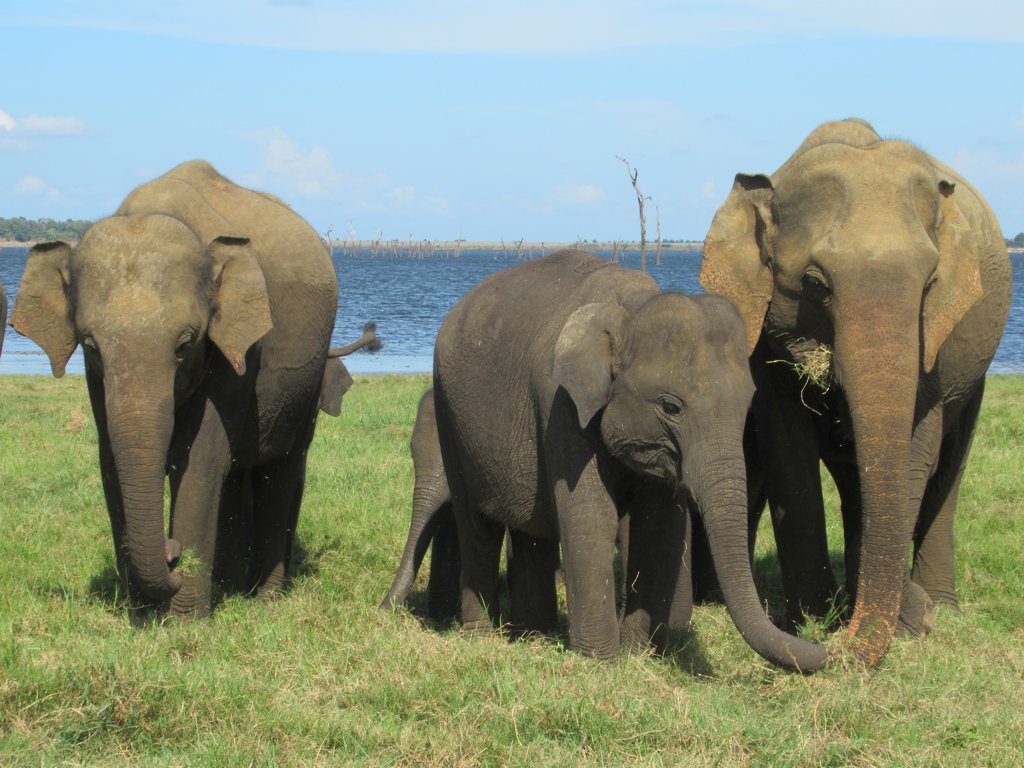
Elephants at Kaudulla National Park

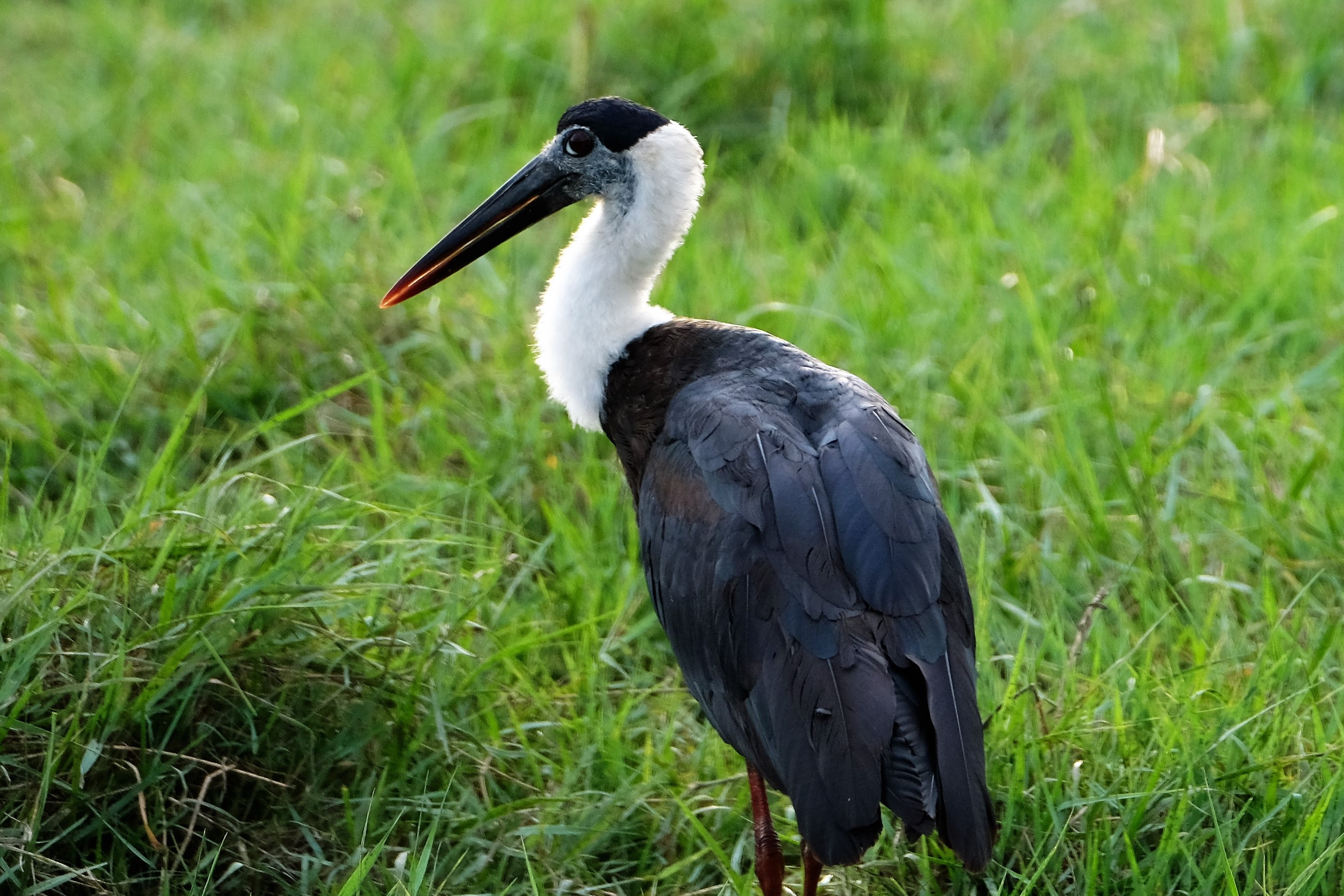
Asian woolly-necked stork in the park.

== Physical features ==
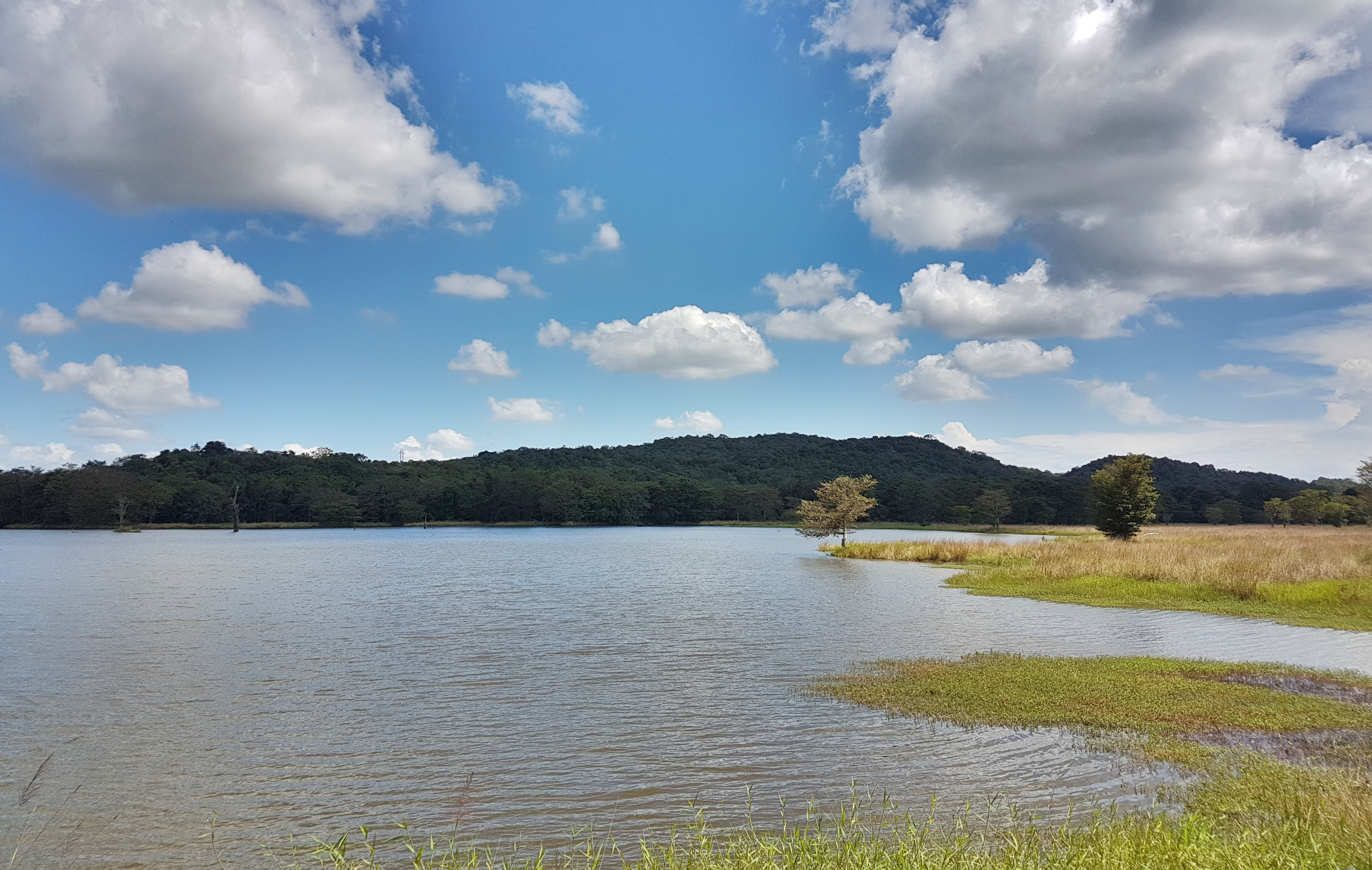
Watering hole at the park.

The region receives an annual rainfall of 1,500–2,000 millimetres (59–79 in) including rain from the north-east monsoon. A dry period persists from April to October. Temperature ranges from 20.6 °C (69.1 °F) to 34.5 °C (94.1 °F). Many plant and grass species grow well during the rainy season whilst an abundance of food and water, even in the dry period, attracts a large number of herbivorous mammals to the park.

== Flora ==
The vegetation of the park represents Sri Lanka's dry evergreen forests. Chena cultivation and grasslands surround the tank area. The community of phytoplankton in the Kaudulla tank includes blue green algae, Microcystis spp. and diatoms such as Melosira spp.. Manilkara hexandra, Chloroxylon swietenia and Vitex altissima are the dominant tree species in the forest surrounding the tank. Bushes such as Randia dumetorum, and Calotropis gigantea and grasses such as Imperata cylindrica, and Panicum maximum are abundant in some areas.

== Fauna ==
The faunal species recorded in the park include 24 species of mammals, 25 species of reptiles, 26 species of fish, and 160 species of bird.

In the drought period Sri Lankan elephants move to the Minneriya tank to drink and feed. Around the month of September the elephants move to the Kaudulla tank in search of more water and food. Despite the escalating human-elephant conflict, the number of elephants increased in the dry zone and 211 individuals have been counted in Kaudulla as recently as 2008.

Sri Lankan sambar deer, Sri Lankan axis deer, chevrotain, wild boar, Sri Lankan leopard, and sloth bear are other mammals found in the park. Kaudulla National Park is also one of the sites in which the gray slender loris is reportedly found in Sri Lanka. Following the discovery of a two-month-old albino Sri Lankan axis deer calf abandoned by her mother, it is supposed that Kaudulla is probably the only national park in Sri Lanka to have albino axis deer.

Large water birds such as spot-billed pelican and lesser adjutant visit the Kaudulla tank. Fish species in the tank include the freshwater Oreochromis mossambicus. Fejervarya pulla is an endemic amphibian to Sri Lanka that inhabits the National Park. Freshwater turtles, Indian flap-shelled turtle and Indian black turtle are the noteworthy reptiles.

== Conservation ==
It is reported that the spread of invasive, alien species such as Lantana camara is posing a threat to the wildlife of the park. The Kaudulla-Minneriya jungle corridor linking Kaudulla to Minneriya National Park was declared a Wildlife Sanctuary in 2004.

== See also ==
- Protected areas of Sri Lanka
