= Paddy frog =

Paddy frog may refer to:

- Green paddy frog (Hylarana erythraea), a frog in the family Ranidae found in Southeast Asia
- Hong Kong paddy frog (Fejervarya multistriata), a frog in the family Dicroglossidae found in China and Taiwan and possibly Vietnam, Laos, Thailand, and Myanmar
- Stejneger's paddy frog (Micryletta steinegeri), a frog in the family Microhylidae endemic to Taiwan
