= Kalu Ganga Dam =

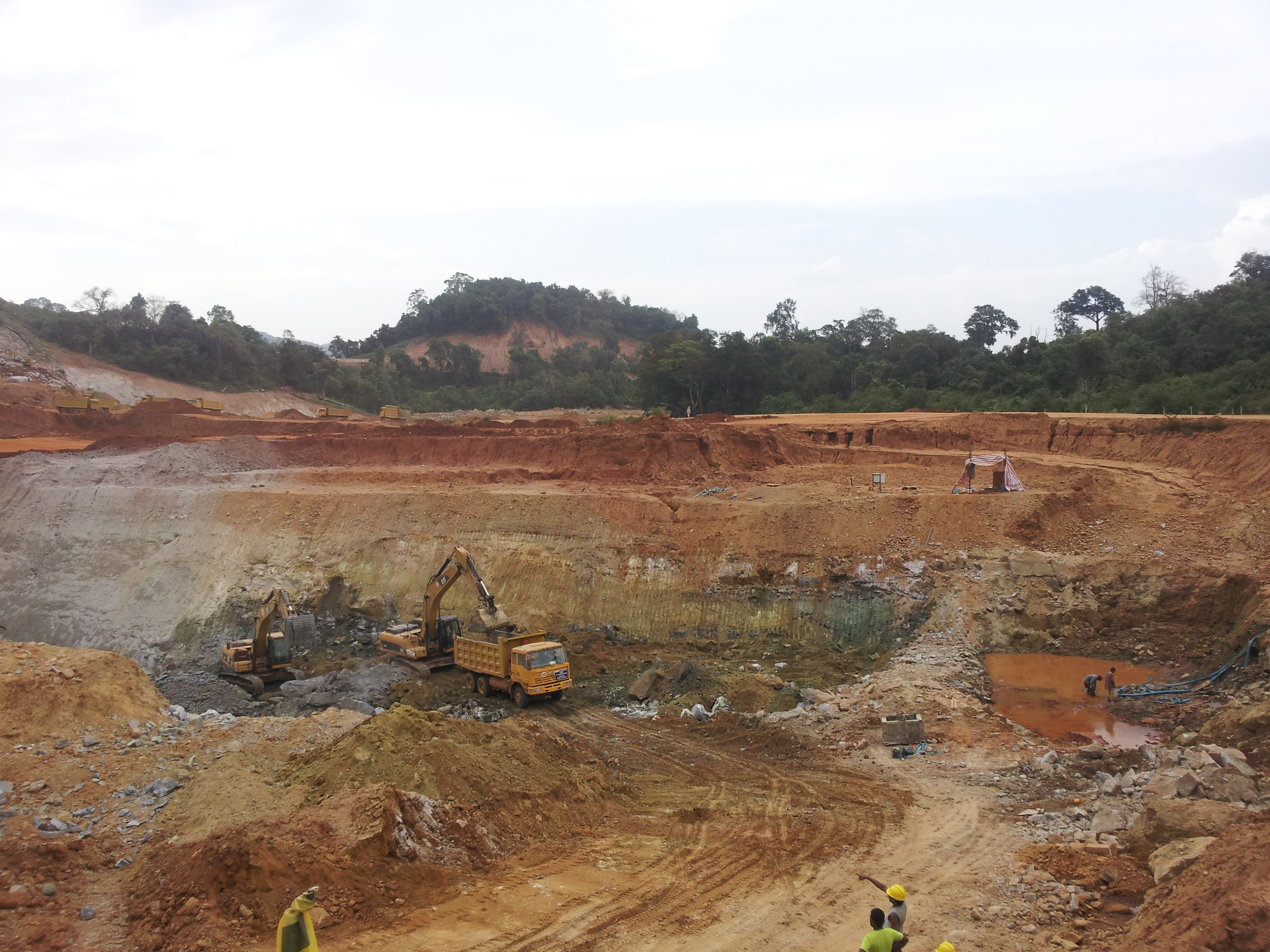
- Kaluganga Dam project site

- Location within Sri Lanka
- Country: Sri Lanka
- Location: Pallegama
- Coordinates: 07°33′35″N 80°50′09″E
- Purpose: Irrigation
- Status: Operational
- Construction began: 02 April 2014
- Opening date: 26 December 2018
- Owner: Mahaweli Authority

Dam and spillways
- Type of dam: Gravity dam
- Impounds: Kalu Ganga
- Height: 67 m (220 ft)
- Length: 546 m (1,791 ft)

Reservoir
- Creates: Kalu Ganga Reservoir

The Kalu Ganga Dam is a large gravity dam, and the second vital component of the larger and more complex Moragahakanda — Kalu Ganga Project across the Kalu Ganga at Pallegama, in the Matale District of Sri Lanka. The Kalu Ganga is a tributary of the Amban Ganga which in turn is a tributary of the Mahaweli River, the longest river in Sri Lanka. Construction of the project was launched by President Mahinda Rajapaksa on 25 January 2007. The maiden waters of the dam was released in July 2018.

The larger combined project involved the construction of the Kalu Ganga Dam and Reservoir, along with the separate Moragahakanda Dam and Reservoir, for irrigation and power generation purposes. Both these sites were going to be located approximately 10 km (6.2 mi) apart.

The total development cost for both sites totaled to approximately Rs. 48.145 billion (approximately US$370 million) and was being carried out by Central Engineering Consultancy Bureau and Sinohydro.(

== Funding ==
The development of the Kalu Ganga segment was supposed to cost US$167 million. 22% or US$37 million of this was funded by the Kuwait Fund, 27.5% or US$46 million was funded by the Saudi Fund for Development, while the rest was borne by the Government of Sri Lanka. The funds will be payable in 20 years, including a 5-year grace period.

The funding from OPEC will carry an interest rate of 3.2% and a service charge of 1% on the principal amount withdrawn and outstanding.

== Dam and reservoir ==
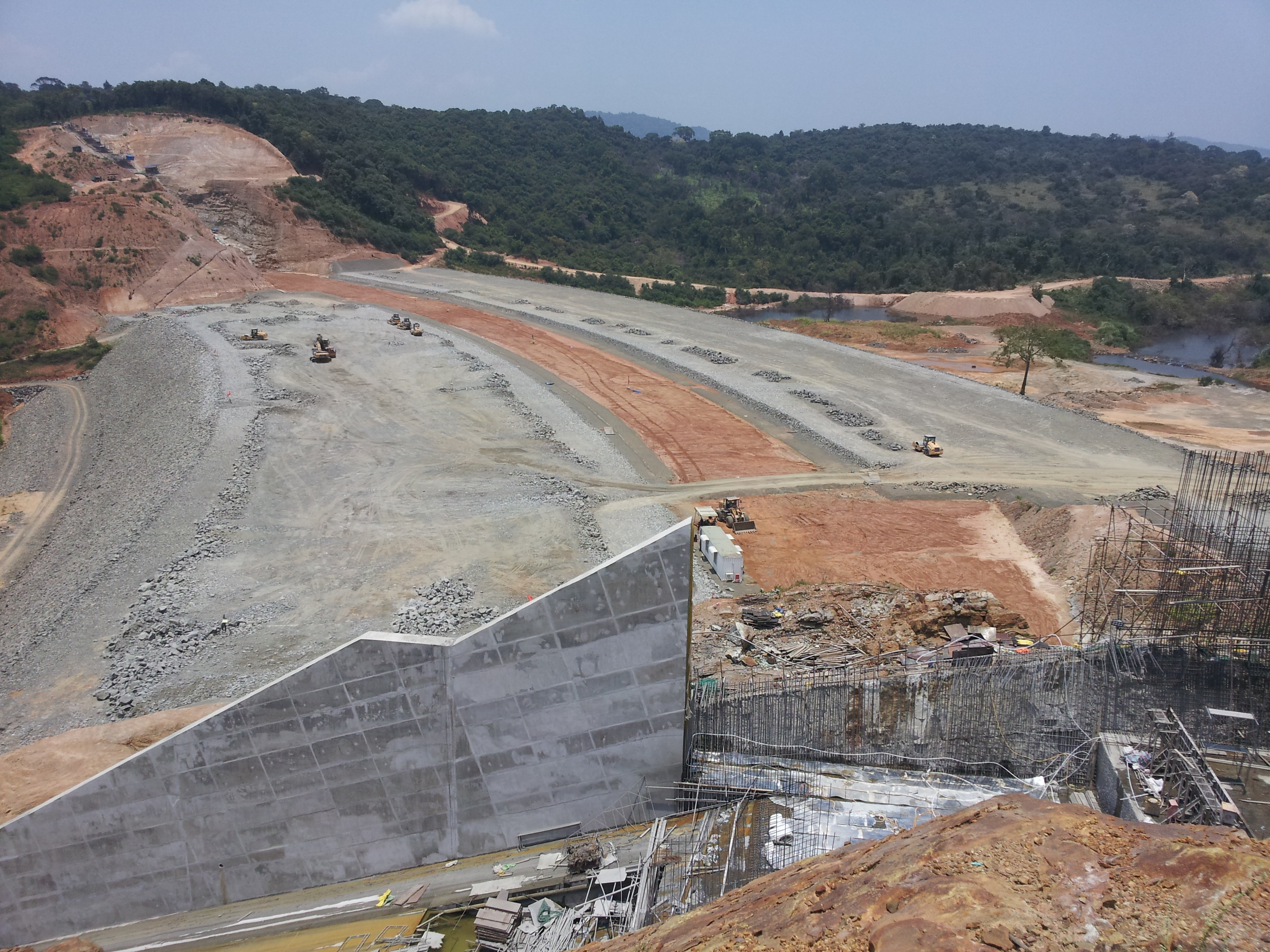
Base of Kaluganga Dam

The primary Kalu Ganga Dam will be a 67 m (220 ft) high concrete gravity dam, measuring 546 m (1,791 ft) in length. To support the new Kalu Ganga Reservoir created by the dam, two additional saddle dams were also to be created to contain the reservoir. The primary dam and saddle dams were estimated to cost approximately US$102.2 million.

In addition to using the reservoir's water for irrigation, a percentage of it would be consistently transferred via tunnel to the Moragahakanda Reservoir for further irrigation uses and hydroelectricity generation.

== Environmental and Social Impact of the Dam Construction ==
A large area of forest east of Pallegama has been cleared for the construction of the dam, and even more has been cleared for the construction of a new residential and agricultural colony east of the dam. The forest area cleared is adjoining Wasgamuwa National Park and linked the forests on the eastern side of Knuckles Mountain Range with the Wasgamuwa National Park. Elephants and other wildlife used to inhabit this area and used it as corridor. There are attempts to minimize environmental impact by reforesting catchment areas, and declaration of elephant corridors to the Wasgamuwa, Girithale, and Mineriya national parks.

Several old villages, including Pallegama and Rambukoluwa, have to be abandoned and all the residents have to relocate to the new colony, about 5 to 10 kilometers northeast of Pallegama. Each family is compensated with two acres of land, 1.5 acres of paddy land and half an acre in the residential area to construct a new house.

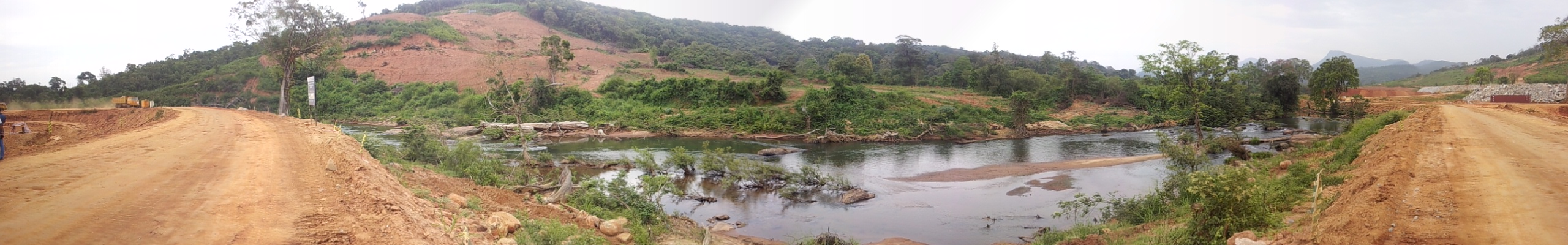
Panorama view of Kaluganga Tunnel construction site.

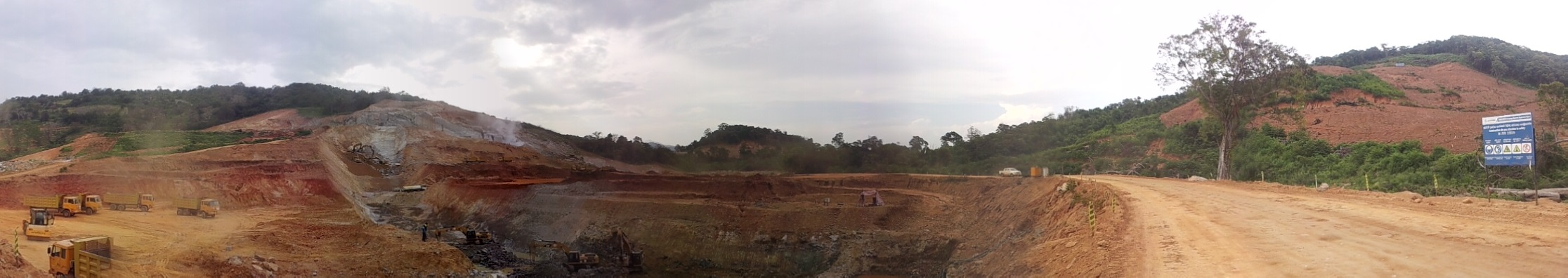
Panorama view of Kaluganga construction site

== See also ==
- List of dams and reservoirs in Sri Lanka
