= Minneriya National Park =

Sri Lankan national park

- මින්නේරිය ජාතික වනෝද්‍යානය மின்னேரியா தேசிய வனம்
- IUCN category II (national park)
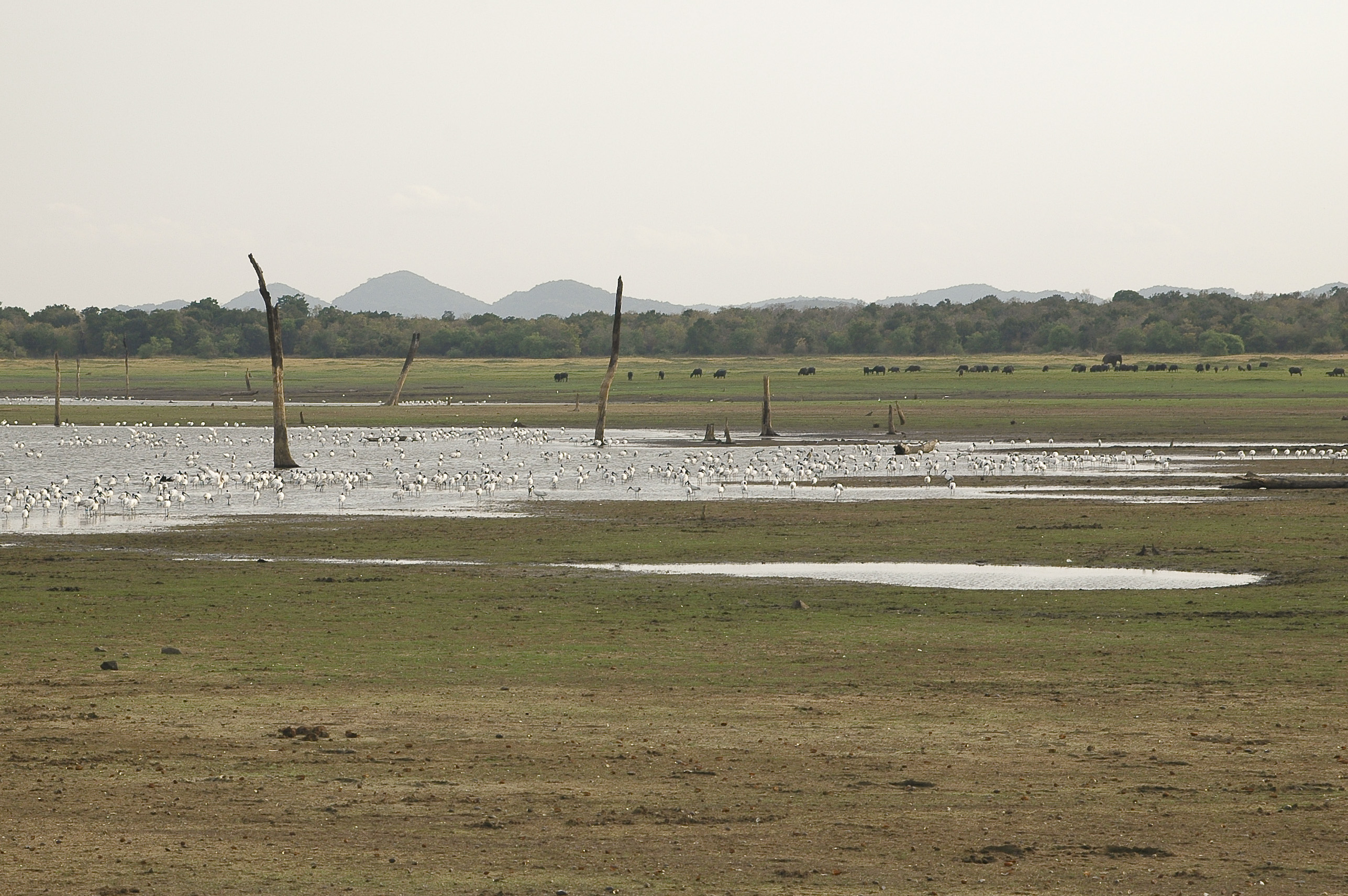
- A flock of birds near the Minneriya reservoir

- Location within Sri Lanka
- Location: North Central province, Sri Lanka
- Nearest city: Polonnaruwa
- Coordinates: 7°58′44″N 80°50′56″E
- Area: 8,889.4 ha (21,966 acres)
- Established: August 12, 1997
- Governing body: Department of Wildlife Conservation

Minneriya National Park (Sinhala: මින්නේරිය ජාතික වනෝද්‍යානය, romanized: Minnēriya Jātika Vanōdyānaya; Tamil: மின்னேரியா தேசிய வனம், romanized: Miṉṉēriyā Tēciya Vaṉam) is a national park in North Central Province of Sri Lanka. The area was designated as a national park on 12 August 1997, having been originally declared as a wildlife sanctuary in 1938. The reason for declaring the area as protected is to protect the catchment of Minneriya tank and the wildlife of the surrounding area. The tank is of historical importance, having been built by King Mahasen in third century AD. The park is a dry season feeding ground for the elephant population dwelling in forests of Matale, Polonnaruwa, and Trincomalee districts. The park earned revenue of Rs. 10.7 million in the six months ending in August 2009. Along with Kaudulla and Girithale, Minneriya forms one of the 70 Important Bird Areas (IBAs) of Sri Lanka. The park is situated 182 kilometres (113 mi) from Colombo.

== Physical features ==
The area is situated in dry zone of Sri Lanka and receives an average rainfall of 1,500–2,000 millimetres (59–79 in). The lowest temperature and highest of the park are 20.6 °C (69.1 °F) and 34.5 °C (94.1 °F) respectively. The main sources of water for the tank are a diversion of Amban River and Elahera canal. The wet season lasts during the north eastern monsoon from October to January and from May to September considered as the dry season. The main habitats of Minneriya are of several types, including low-canopy montane forests, intermediate high-canopy secondary forests, scrublands, abandoned chena lands, grasslands, rocky outcrops, and wetlands.

== Flora ==
Terminalia arjuna, Manilkara hexandra, neem (Azadirachta indica), sacred fig (Ficus religiosa) and Piliostigma racemosum are commonly found in the area around the Minneriya tank. Chloroxylon swietenia, Vitex altissima, Berrya cordifolia, Diospyros quaesita, and Drypetes sepiaria are dominant plant species in Minneriya. Randia dumetorum, crotons, and Calotropis gigantea are common in abandoned chena cultivations and scrublands. Plantations of eucalyptus and teak, established by the Department of Forest Conservation, can be seen within the park. Monocots and grass species include Bambusa bambos, Ceylon date palm (Phoenix pusilla), Imperata cylindrica, and Panicum maximum.

== Fauna ==
The national park's faunal species include 24 species of mammals, 160 species of birds, 9 species of amphibians, 25 species of reptiles, 26 species of fish, and 75 species of butterflies.

=== Elephant gathering ===
The annual elephant gathering and migration in the Minneriya National Park

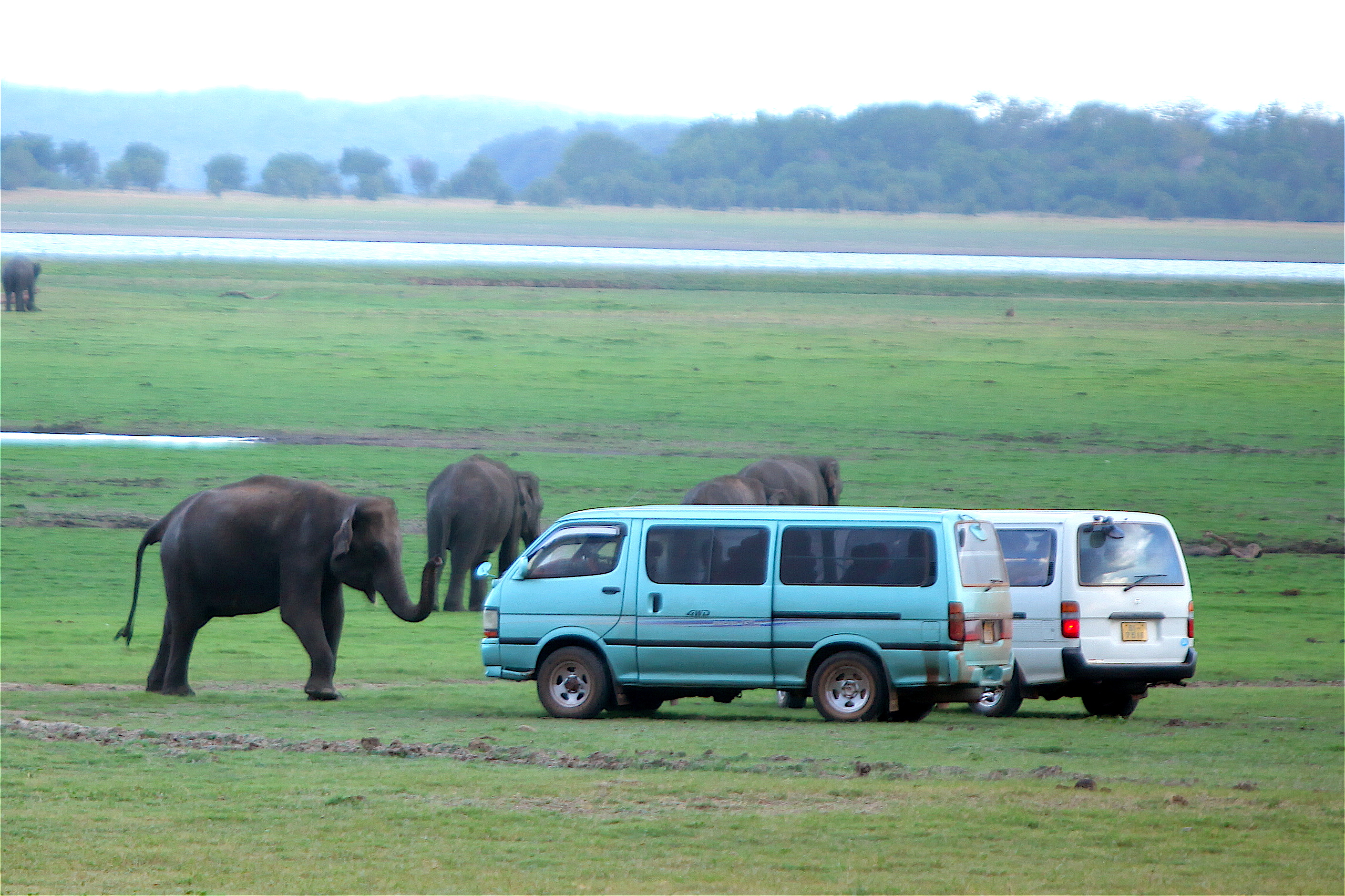
At the park, certain elephants are known to be more aggressive as a result of encounters with humans. According to park wardens, this elephant lost a baby when it was struck by a car. Pregnant again, she has rammed some 15 tourist vehicles in the park this past month.

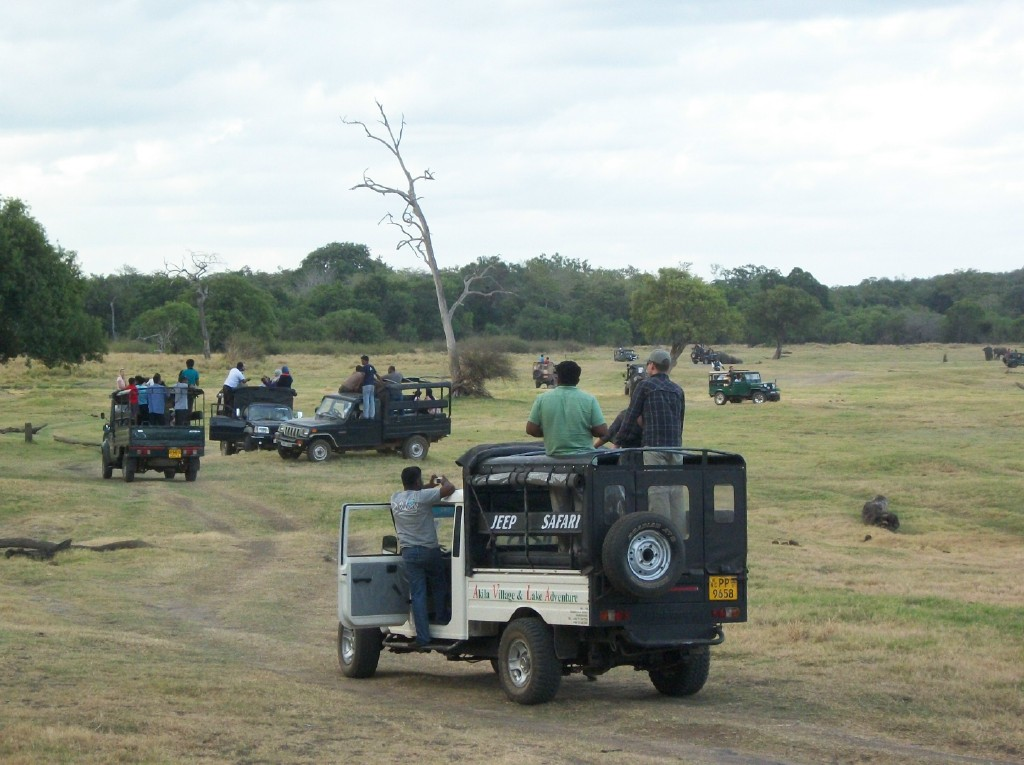
Safari vehicles in the Park

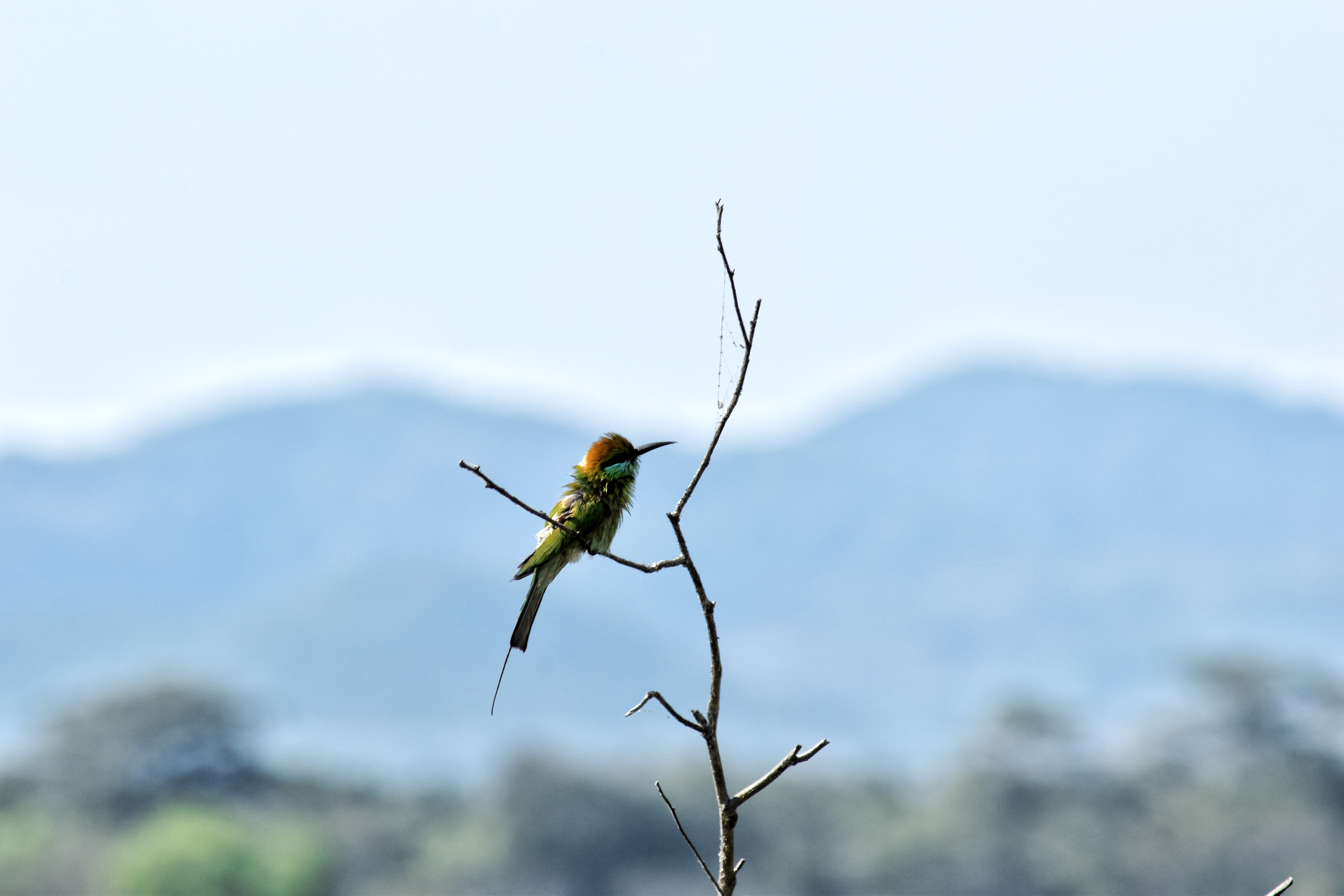
Asian green bee-eater (Merops orientalis) in the park.

Large numbers of Sri Lankan elephants are attracted to grass fields on the edges of the reservoir during the dry season. The Minneriya tank contributes to sustain a large herd. Elephants gathered here is numbering around 150–200. Some reports account number of elephants to as high as 700. They migrate here from Wasgamuwa National Park and benefit from food and shelter of the park's forest. Tourists visit Minneriya largely because of elephants, especially in dry season.

=== Other animals ===
The park is an important habitat for the two endemic monkeys of Sri Lanka: purple-faced langur and toque macaque. Large herbivorous mammals such as Sri Lankan sambar deer and Sri Lankan axis deer frequent the park. Rare and endangered species such as Sri Lankan leopard and Sri Lankan sloth bear inhabit in Minneriya. Minneriya is one of the areas where the gray slender loris is reportedly found in Sri Lanka.

The Minneriya reservoir is an important habitat for large water birds such as lesser adjutant, painted stork, and spot-billed pelican. Minneriya is a dormitory for many resident as well as migrant bird species. Flocks of 2000 little cormorants have been reported. Great white pelican, ruddy turnstone, and grey heron are the other water birds here. Among the endemic birds are Sri Lanka junglefowl, Sri Lanka hanging parrot, brown-capped babbler, Sri Lanka grey hornbill, black-crested bulbul and crimson-fronted barbet. The number of threatened birds recorded from this national park is 11.

Amphibians of Fejervarya pulla and Polypedates cruciger have been recorded from the area. There are eight species of endemic reptiles, and all of them are considered threatened. Painted-lip lizard and Lankascincus fallax are among them. Saltwater crocodile, Indian python, Asian water monitor, and Bengal monitor are among the other reptiles. Four of the fresh water fishes recorded from Minneriya are endemic to Sri Lanka.

== Threats and conservation ==
The main threat to the park's forest is clearance for firewood and the practice might be resulted in decreasing the levels of water of the reservoir. Water pollution in bathing areas, encroachment, illegal agricultural practices, overfishing, poaching are the other threats caused by man. Spread of invasive Lantana camara is a natural threat. The area is also part of Minneriya-Giritale Nature Reserve which declared in four stages from 1988 to 1997. Conservative measures including habitat restoration and removing livestock from the area, have been proposed.

== See also ==
- Protected areas of Sri Lanka
