= Hong Kong frog =

Hong Kong frog may refer to:

- Hong Kong cascade frog (Amolops hongkongensis), a frog in the family Ranidae found in China
- Hong Kong paddy frog (Fejervarya multistriata), a frog in the family Dicroglossidae found in China and Taiwan and possibly Vietnam, Laos, Thailand, and Myanmar
- Hong Kong spiny frog (Quasipaa exilispinosa), a frog in the family Dicroglossidae found in China
- Hong Kong whipping frog (Polypedates megacephalus), a frog in the family Rhacophoridae found in China and Taiwan
