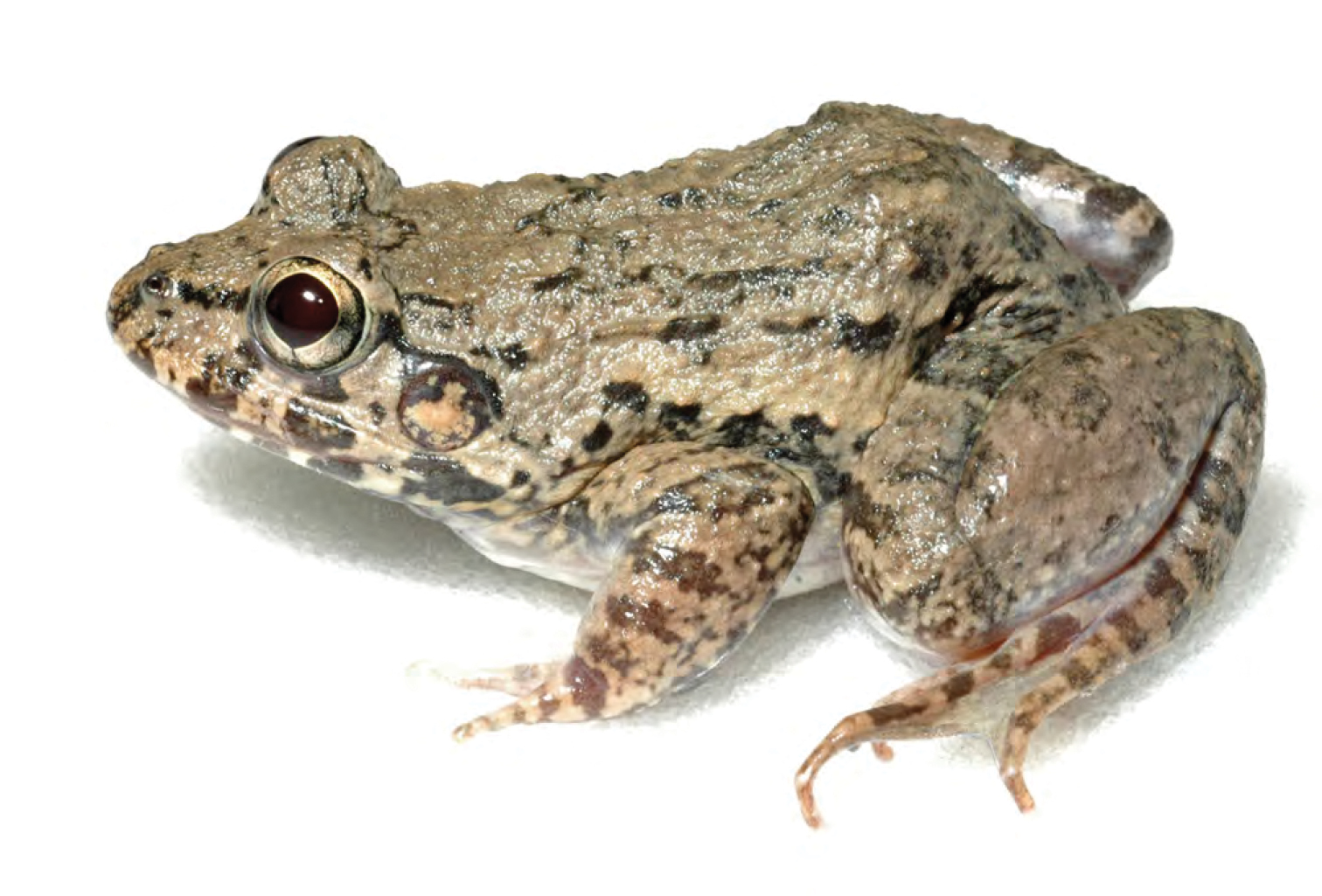

Conservation status
- Least Concern (IUCN 3.1)

Scientific classification
- Kingdom: Animalia
- Phylum: Chordata
- Class: Amphibia
- Order: Anura
- Family: Dicroglossidae
- Genus: Fejervarya
- Species: F. moodiei

Binomial name
- Fejervarya moodiei (Taylor, 1920)

Synonyms
- Rana moodiei Taylor, 1920

= Fejervarya moodiei =

Species of frog

Fejervarya moodiei is a species of frog in the family Dicroglossidae. It has in the past been often mixed with Fejervarya cancrivora; its distribution is not well known but includes the Philippines (its type locality is Manila, Luzon), Thailand, Hainan Island (China), and India. Its natural habitats are freshwater marshes and intermittent freshwater marshes.
