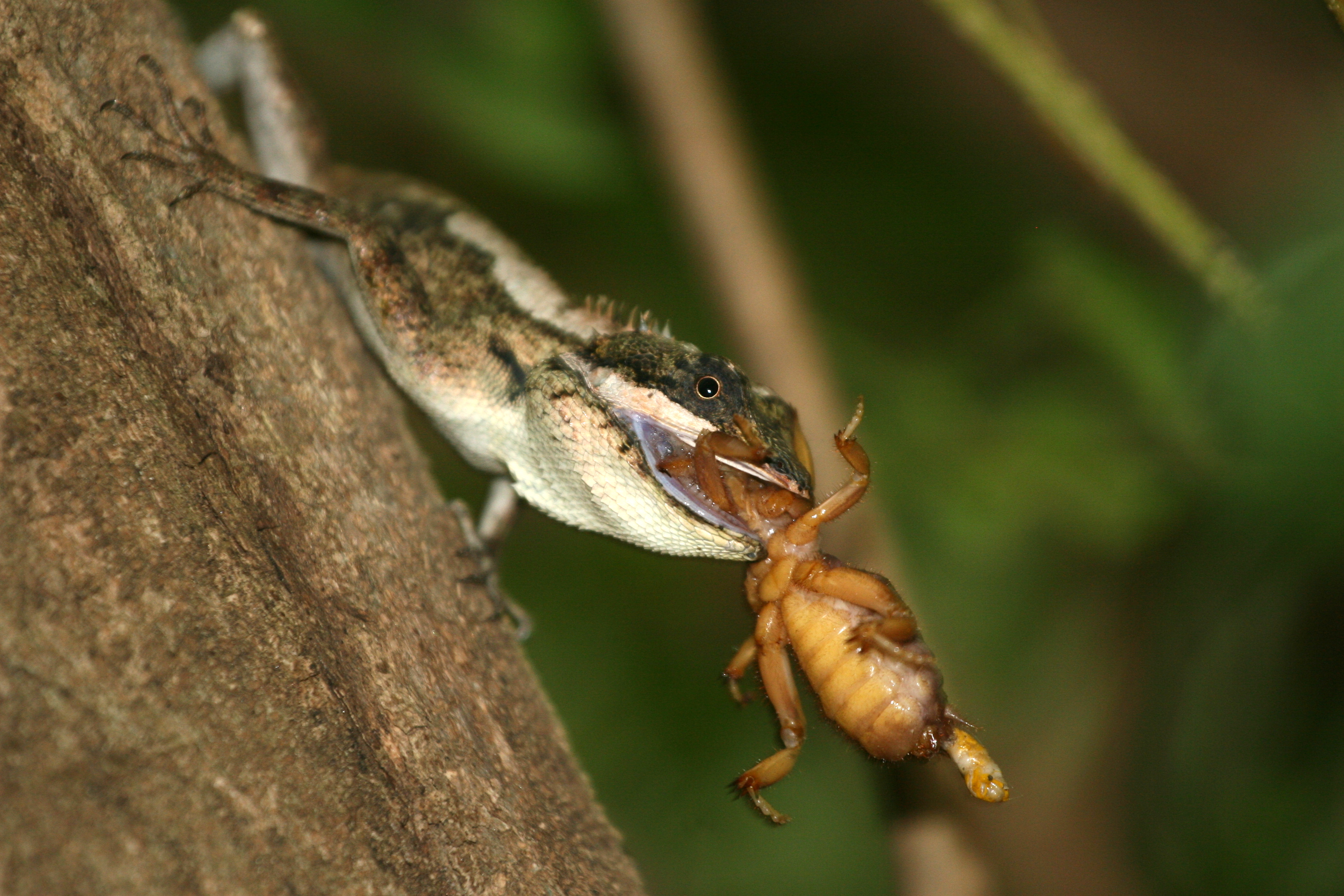

Conservation status
- Least Concern (IUCN 3.1)

Scientific classification
- Kingdom: Animalia
- Phylum: Chordata
- Class: Reptilia
- Order: Squamata
- Suborder: Iguania
- Family: Agamidae
- Genus: Calotes
- Species: C. ceylonensis

Binomial name
- Calotes ceylonensis F. Müller, 1887

Synonyms
- Calotes mystaceus var. ceylonensis Müller, 1887; Calotes ceylonensis Boulenger, 1890; Calotes kelaarti Nevill, 1887; Calotes saleoides Werner, 1896; Calotes ceylonensis Smith, 1935; Calotes ceylonensis Taylor, 1953; Calotes ceylonensis Wermuth, 1967; Calotes ceylonensis Macey et al. 2000; Calotes ceylonensis Karunarathna & Amarasinghe, 2011

= Calotes ceylonensis =

Species of lizard

Calotes ceylonensis, commonly known as the painted-lipped lizard or the Ceylon bloodsucker, is a species of lizard in the family Agamidae. It is one of four Calotes species endemic to Sri Lanka.In Sinhalese language, it is known as "Thol Visithuru Katussa - තොල් විසිතුරු කටුස්සා"

== Habitat ==
C. ceylonensis is confined to monsoon forests, plantations, and home gardens in the dry and intermediate zones of Sri Lanka.

== Geographic range ==
Localities in Sri Lanka at which C. ceylonensis has been collected include Mankulam, Elahera, Nilgala, Minneriya National Park, Sigiriya, Kandalama, Laggala, Kumana National Park, Puttalam and Kumbalgamuwa, up to elevation of about 400 m (1,300 ft).

== Description ==
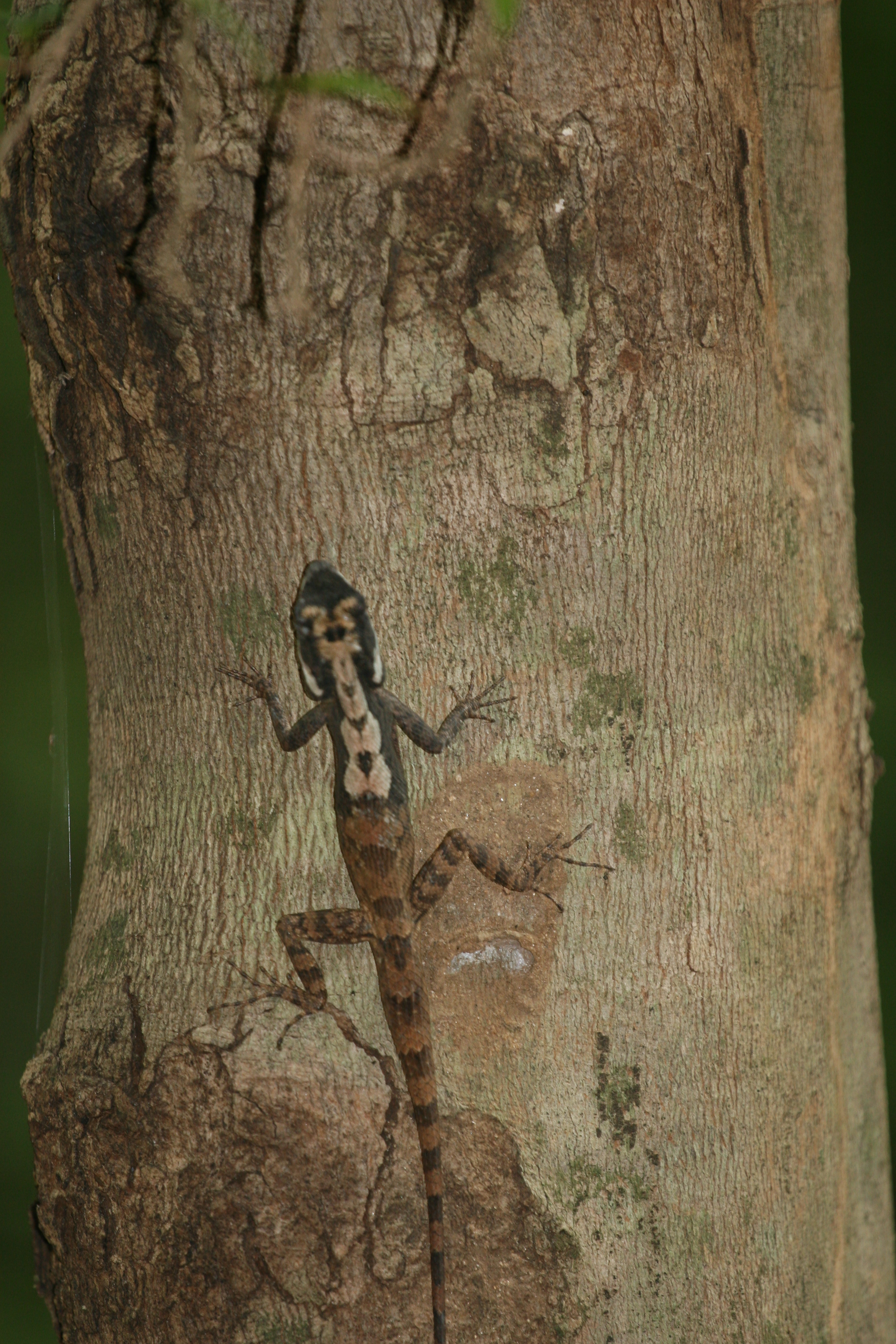
Basking

C. ceylonensis is a colorful, arboreal agamid. The length of the head is one and half times the width. The body is laterally compressed. The tail is long and slender, about or over twice the head-body length. The cheeks are swollen. Two separated spines can be seen above the tympanum. The nuchal crest is formed with low spines. Midbody scale rows number 54–60.

The dorsum is brown, with indistinct brown crossbands. The head and anterior part of body are blackish-brown. There is a bright red or reddish-orange stripe on the upper lip that extends to the back of the head. When the lizard is threatened, or agitated by stress, the brown-colored lip turns to a bright white color, as does the dorso-nuchal crest. The throat of adult males is black. The tail is brown with dark crossbands. The venter is pale brown with darker crossbands.

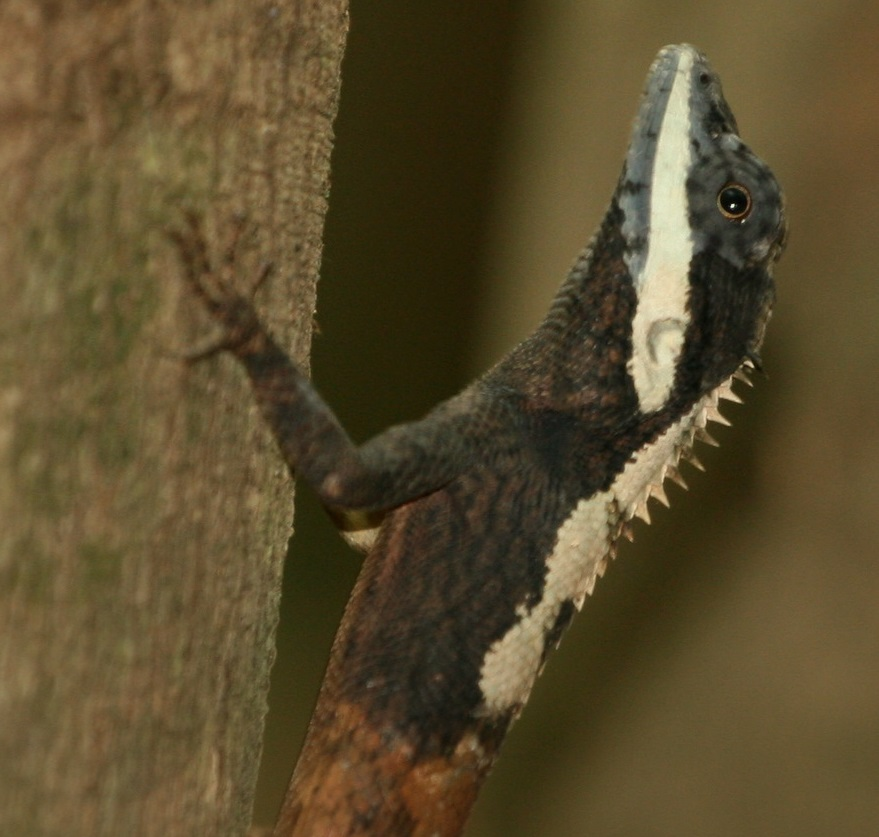

== Behavior ==
C. ceylonensis is active during the day on tree trunks.

== Diet ==
The diet of C. ceylonensis comprises insects and other arthropods.

== Reproduction ==
About 5–10 eggs, measuring 14.5 mm × 16.5 mm (0.57 in × 0.65 in), are produced at a time.
