= Kulasinghe Reservoir, Moragahakanda =

Moragahakanda Dam
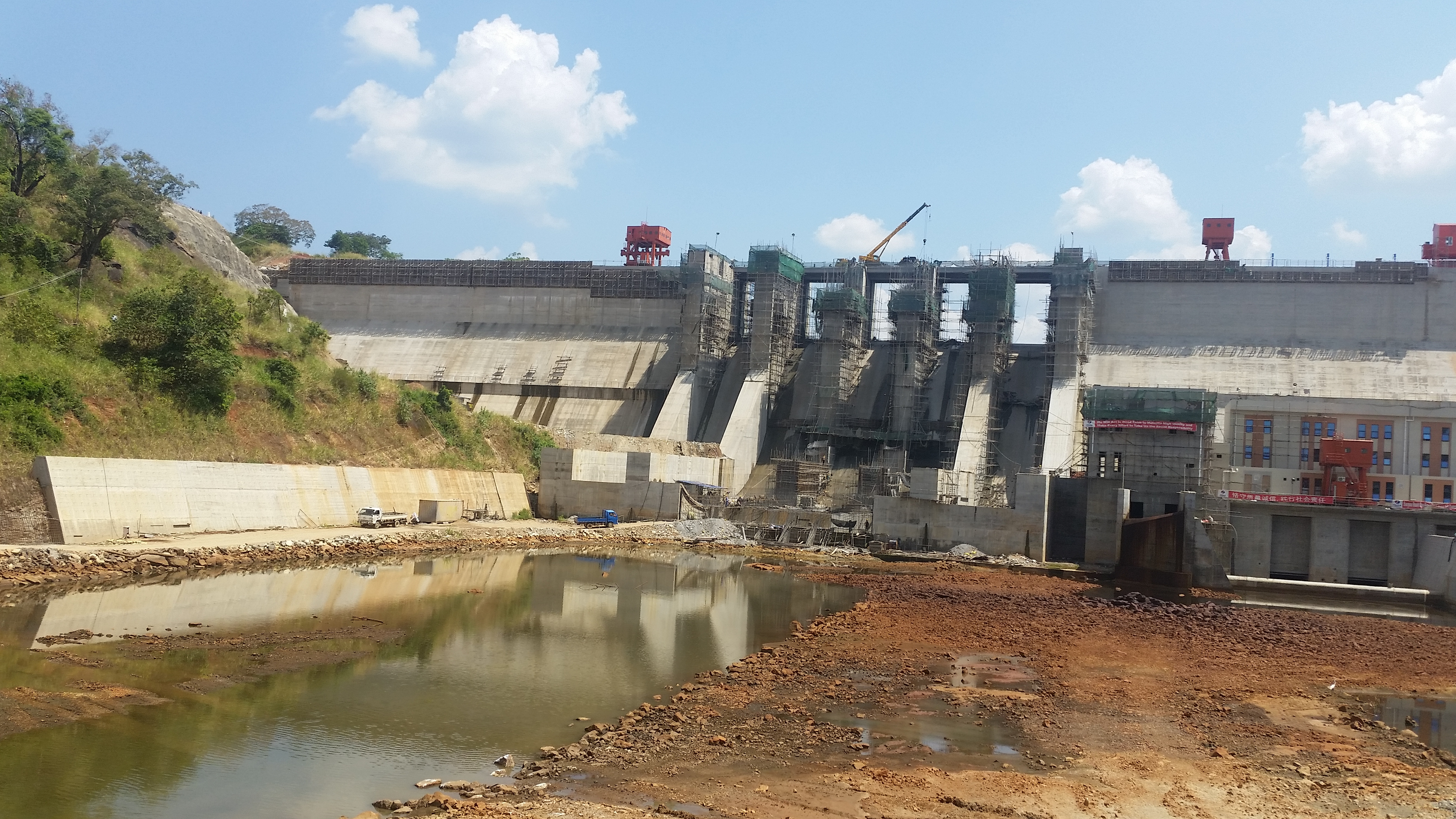
- Spillways of the Moragahakanda Dam.

- Location within Sri Lanka
- Official name: මොරගහකන්ද අරමුන
- Country: Sri Lanka
- Location: Elahera, North Central Province
- Coordinates: 07°41′56″N 80°46′12″E
- Purpose: Power
- Status: Operational
- Construction began: 25 January 2007
- Opening date: 8 January 2018
- Owner: Mahaweli Authority

Dam and spillways
- Type of dam: Gravity dam
- Impounds: Amban River
- Height (foundation): 65 m (213 ft)

Reservoir
- Creates: Kulasinghe Reservoir කුලසිංහ ජලාශය
- Active capacity: 521,000,000 m^{3} (1.84×10^{10} ft^{3})
- Normal elevation: 185 m (607 ft)

Power Station
- Coordinates: 07°41′59″N 80°46′11″E
- Operator: Mahaweli Authority of Sri Lanka-MASL
- Installed capacity: 25 MW

The Moragahakanda Dam (Sinhala: මොරගහකන්ද ව්‍යාපෘතිය), officially Kulasinghe Reservoir, is a large gravity dam, and the main component of the larger and more complex Moragahakanda — Kalu Ganga Project, across the Amban River at Elahera, in the Matale District of Sri Lanka. Construction began on 25 January 2007 and was completed in 2018. The maiden water release of the dam was in January 2017. Morgahakanda/Kaluganga project is the last of the Great Mahaveli project

The larger combined project involves the construction of the Moragahakanda Dam and Reservoir, along with the separate Kalu Ganga Dam and Reservoir, for irrigation and power generation purposes. Both these sites would be located approximately 10 km (6.2 mi) apart.

The total development cost for both sites totals to approximately Rs. 48.145 billion (approximately US$370 million) and is being carried out by SMEC Holdings and Sinohydro.

A granite Buddha statue built opposite the Moragahakanda reservoir was unveiled on 23 July 2018.

== History ==
The original Moragahakanda reservoir was first constructed by King Wasaba in 111 AD.

=== Mahaweli Development programme ===
According to the Mahaweli Master Plan of 1968, the development of Mahaweli was divided to three projects named A, B and C out of which the last 'C' project was the Moragahakanda Multi-Purpose Reservoir. In 1977 the project was modified and the Accelerated Mahaweli Scheme(AMS) started and was completed in 6 years. However Moragahakanda was not in the AMS. The J.R. Jayewardene Government would later secure funding for the project from Japan but communal violence delayed the project. The construction of the project commenced on 2007 under Mahinda Rajapakse Government and completed in 2018.

== Dam and reservoir ==
The Moragahakanda Dam, is a 65 m (213 ft) high gravity dam. The dam created the Moragahakanda Reservoir, which has an active storage capacity of 521,000,000 m^{3} (1.84×10^{10} ft^{3}) of water, at a surface elevation of 185 m (607 ft).

Two additional embankment saddle dams will also be built to contain the Moragahakanda Reservoir. The reservoir of the Kalu Ganga Dam will be linked via tunnel.

== Primary uses ==
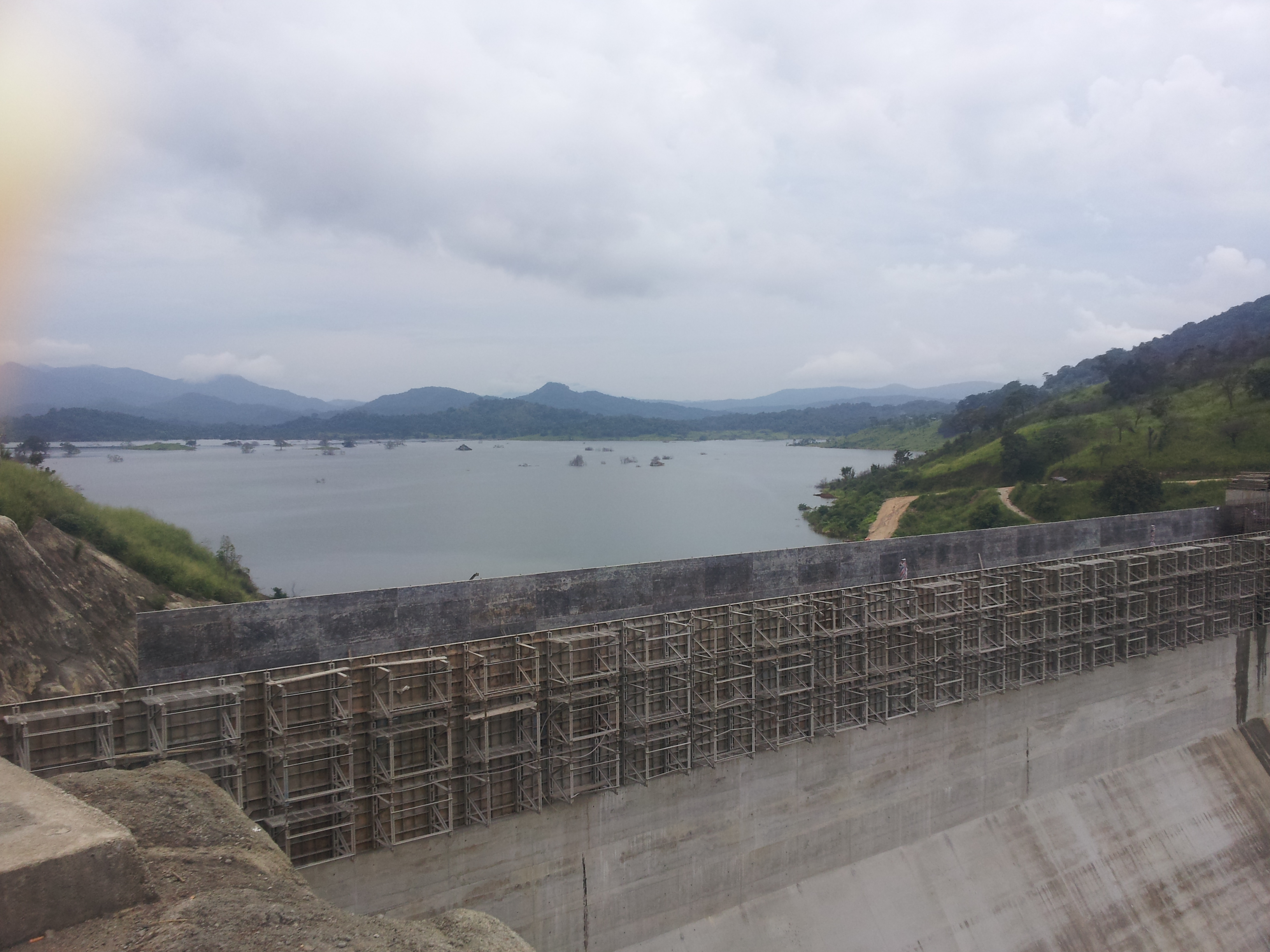
Moragahakanda Reservoir in February 2017.

=== Irrigation ===
Water from both, the Moragahakanda and Kalu Ganga reservoirs, will be primarily used to support agricultural needs to an area of at least 81,422 ha (814.2 km^{2}). This will increase rice production by 81% or 109,000 t (240,000,000 lb), amounting to an estimated monetary benefit of US$1.67 million, annually.

=== Inland fishing ===
The reservoirs would also create a source of inland fishing, generating approximately 4,700 t (10,400,000 lb) or the monetary equivalent of US$1.67 million, annually.

=== Water supply ===
Along with the reservoir of the Kalu Ganga Dam, an increase of 64,000,000 m^{3} (2.3×10^{9} ft^{3}) of potable and industrial water supply could be ensured by 2032, to regions including Matale, Anuradhapura, Trincomalee, and Polonnaruwa.

=== Power generation ===
Water from the Moragahakanda Reservoir is used to power the 25-megawatt Moragahakanda Hydroelectric Power Station. The substitution of this hydropower with traditional fossil fuel power generation is estimated to save up to US$ 2.49 billion annually. *[This latter claim requires correction, as it is impossible to generate this much power from a 25-megawatt generator in one year. The maximum power possible from a 25-megawatt generator at .06 per kw (wholesale) is $13.14 million (US).]

Construction of the power station costs US$382 million, with an EIRR (Economic Internal Rate of Return) of 22%.

== Roads and bridges ==
The construction of the dam and reservoir also required the construction of multiple access roads and rerouting of existing main roads, as well as the construction of the 300 m (984 ft) long Moragahakanda Bridge costing Rs. 308 million.

== Rename ==
On 23 July 2018, under the patronage of president Maithreepala Sirisena, the reservoir was officially named as Kulasinghe Reservoir, in memory of late Dr. A. N. S. Kulasinghe. Kulasinghe was a Sri Lankan civil engineer who served in several projects throughout the country.

== See also ==
- List of dams and reservoirs in Sri Lanka
- List of power stations in Sri Lanka
