= Fejervarya iskandari =

Conservation status
- Least Concern (IUCN 3.1)

Scientific classification
- Kingdom: Animalia
- Phylum: Chordata
- Class: Amphibia
- Order: Anura
- Family: Dicroglossidae
- Genus: Fejervarya
- Species: F. iskandari

Binomial name
- Fejervarya iskandari Veith, Kosuch, Ohler & Dubois, 2001

Species of amphibian

Fejervarya iskandari is a species of frog that is endemic to Java, Indonesia. It is named in honor of Djoko Iskandar, an Indonesian herpetologist. It has been recorded in Bandung and Sukabumi, West Java.

Male Fejervarya iskandari have a moderately stout body and measure 40–43 mm (1.6–1.7 in) in snout–vent length. It is a locally common species living on paddy fields where it also breeds. It is not considered threatened.
