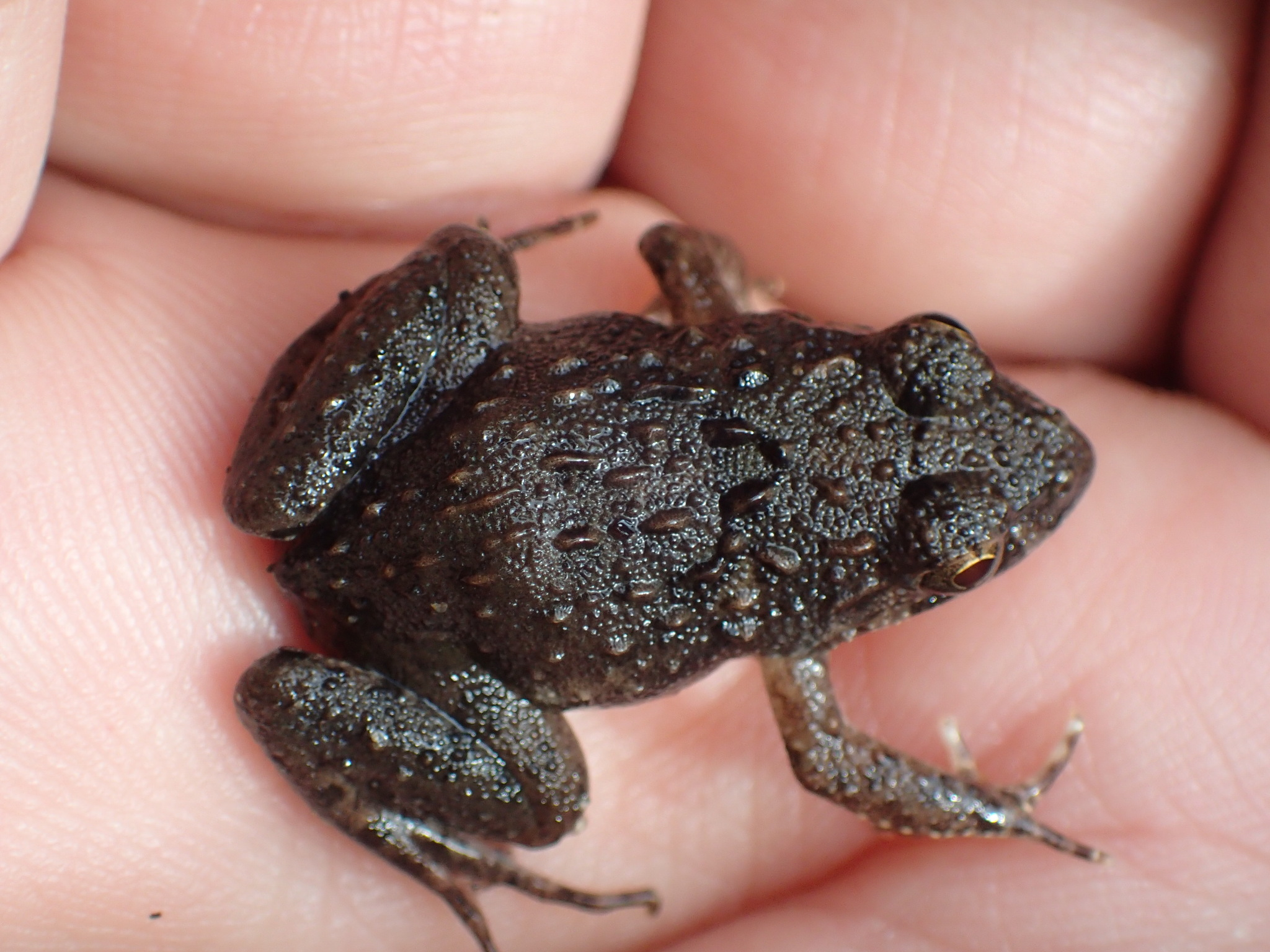

Conservation status
- Data Deficient (IUCN 3.1)

Scientific classification
- Kingdom: Animalia
- Phylum: Chordata
- Class: Amphibia
- Order: Anura
- Family: Dicroglossidae
- Genus: Fejervarya
- Species: F. sakishimensis

Binomial name
- Fejervarya sakishimensis Matsui, Toda & Ota, 2007

= Fejervarya sakishimensis =

Species of amphibian

Fejervarya sakishimensis is a species of frogs in the family Dicroglossidae. It is endemic to Taiwan and the Ryukyu Islands of Japan. It belongs to the Fejervarya limnocharis species complex.

== Sources ==
- Matsui, Masafumi; Toda, Miki; Ota, Hidetoshi (2007). "A new species of frog allied to Fejervarya limnocharis from southern Ryukyus, Japan (Amphibia: Ranidae)". Current Herpetology. 26 (2). Kyoto: 59–63.
- "Fejervarya sakishimensis". American Museum of Natural History.
