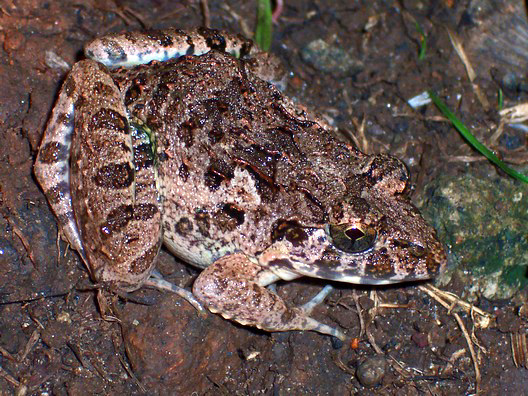
- Crab-eating frog (Fejervarya cancrivora), one of the "true" Fejervarya

Scientific classification
- Kingdom: Animalia
- Phylum: Chordata
- Class: Amphibia
- Order: Anura
- Family: Dicroglossidae
- Subfamily: Dicroglossinae
- Genus: Fejervarya; Bolkay, 1915

Type species
- Rana limnocharis Gravenhorst, 1829

Species
- 14 species, see text

= Fejervarya =

Genus of amphibians

Fejervarya is a genus of frogs in the family Dicroglossidae found in Asia. First proposed in 1915 by István József Bolkay, a Hungarian naturalist, the genus did not see widespread adoption at first. As late as the 1990s it was generally included in Rana, but more recent studies have confirmed its distinctness.

These frogs are remarkable for being extremely euryhaline by amphibian standards. Species such as the crab-eating frog (F. cancrivora) can thrive in brackish water, and its tadpoles can even survive in pure seawater.

== Systematics and taxonomy ==
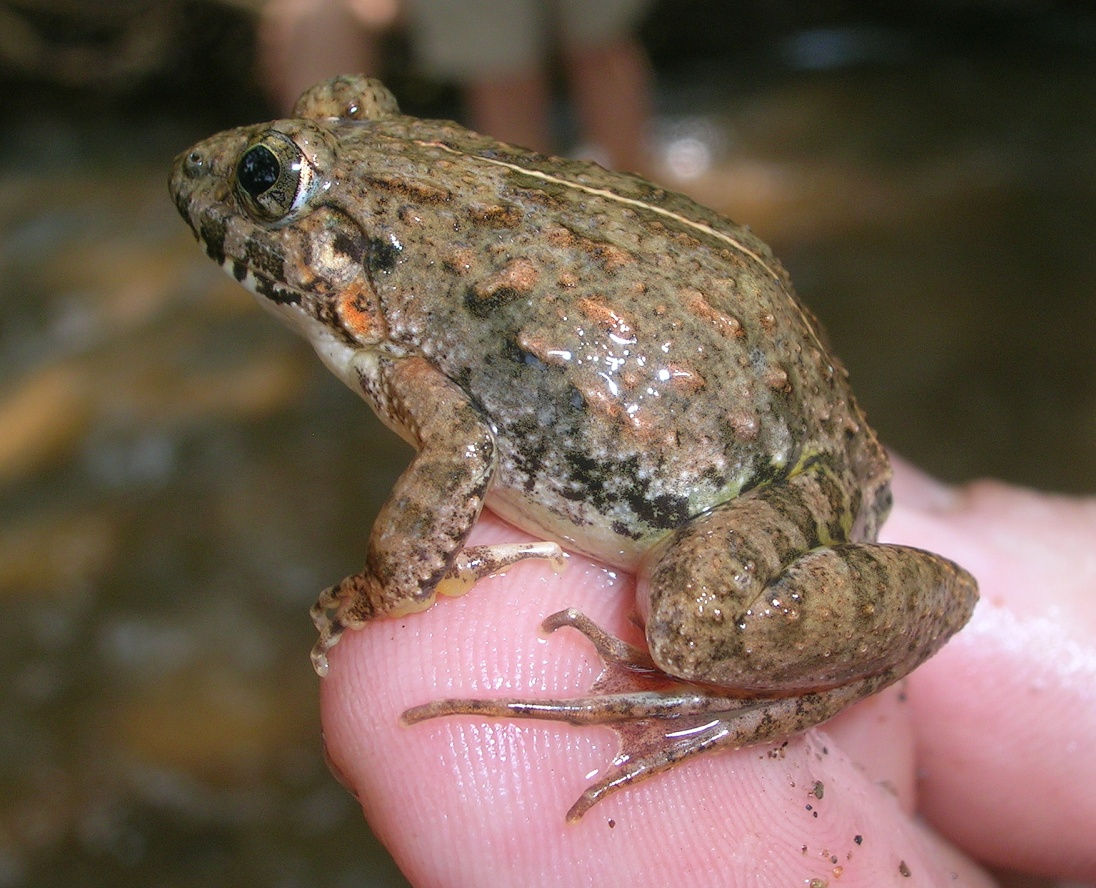
This specimen from the Javadi Hills of Tamil Nadu, India, resembles the Cricket Frog (F. limnocharis) of Indonesia, but its origin suggests that it does not belong to that species, and perhaps not even in the genus Fejervarya sensu stricto.

The name of Fejervarya honors Hungarian zoologist Géza Gyula Fejérváry. It was first introduced as subgenus of Rana and later placed as subgenus of Limnonectes, and was treated as an independent genus first in 1998. However, Fejervarya sensu lato was found to be paraphyletic with respect to Sphaerotheca. This issue was eventually resolved in 2011 by splitting some species to the genus Zakerana (renamed in 2021 as Minervarya). Fejervarya, as now defined, is distributed from eastern India (Orissa) eastwards through Myanmar to southern China and Indochina to the islands of the Sunda Shelf as well as Japan. In contrast, Minervarya contains species from southern Asia (Sri Lanka and Indian subcontinent including Pakistan, Nepal, and Bangladesh).

The widespread Cricket Frog (F. limnocharis) and some others have also been suspected to be cryptic species complexes since at least the 1970s, and indeed a few populations have been identified that almost certainly constitute undescribed species.

== Species ==
The following 15 species are recognised in the genus Fejerverya:

- Fejervarya cancrivora (Gravenhorst, 1829)
- Fejervarya goemchi (Dinesh, Kulkarni, Swamy, and Deepak, 2018)
- Fejervarya iskandari (Veith, Kosuch, Ohler, and Dubois, 2001)
- Fejervarya jhilmilensis (Bahuguna, 2018)
- Fejervarya kawamurai (Djong, Matsui, Kuramoto, Nishioka, and Sumida, 2011)
- Fejervarya kupitzi (Köhler et al., 2019)
- Fejervarya limnocharis (Gravenhorst, 1829)
- Fejervarya moodiei (Taylor, 1920)
- Fejervarya multistriata (Hallowell, 1861)
- Fejervarya orissaensis (Dutta, 1997)
- Fejervarya pulla (Stoliczka, 1870)
- Fejervarya sakishimensis (Matsui, Toda, and Ota, 2008)
- Fejervarya triora (Stuart, Chuaynkern, Chan-ard, and Inger, 2006)
- Fejervarya verruculosa (Roux, 1911)
- Fejervarya vittigera (Wiegmann, 1834)

== Phylogeny ==
The following phylogeny of Fejervarya is from Pyron & Wiens (2011). 7 species are included. Fejervarya is a sister group of Minervarya, which had until recently been included in Fejervarya.

- Fejervarya
  - - - Fejervarya cancrivora
      - Fejervarya vittigera
    - - Fejervarya triora
      - - - Fejervarya iskandari
          - Fejervarya orissaensis
        - - Fejervarya sakishimensis
          - Fejervarya limnocharis

== Vocalisation behaviour ==
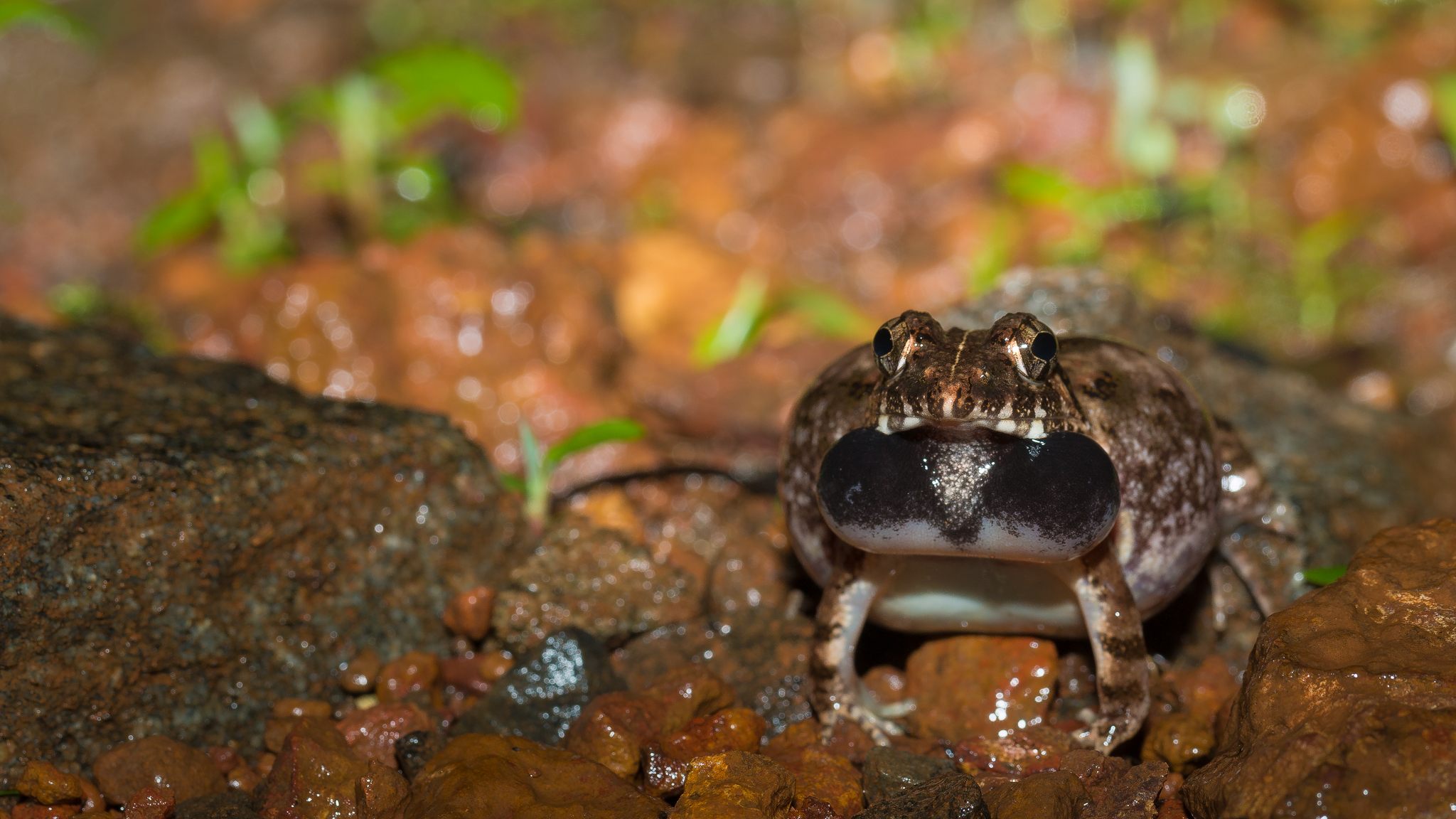
1. Preparing to vocalise - front view

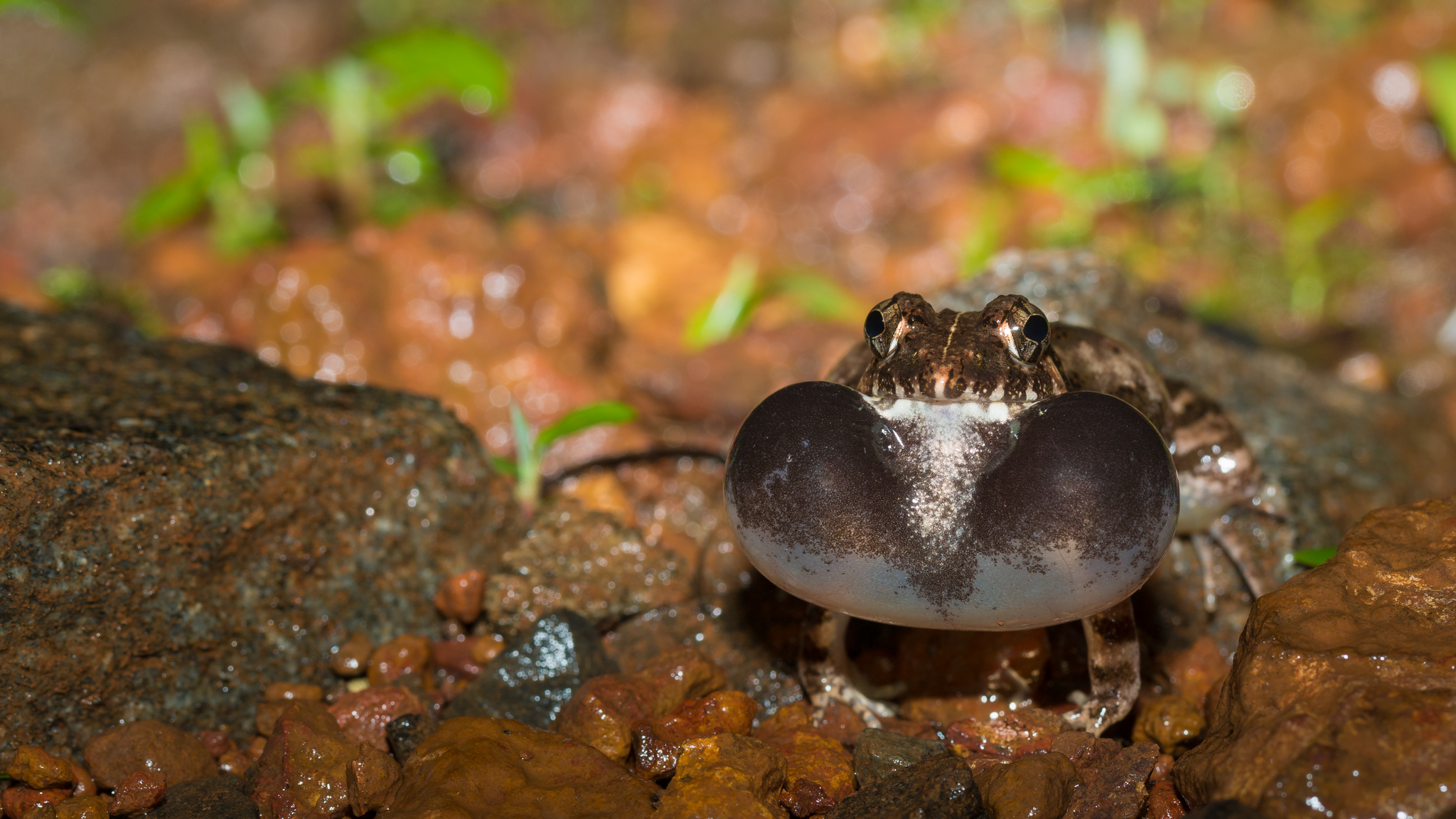
2. Vocalising front view

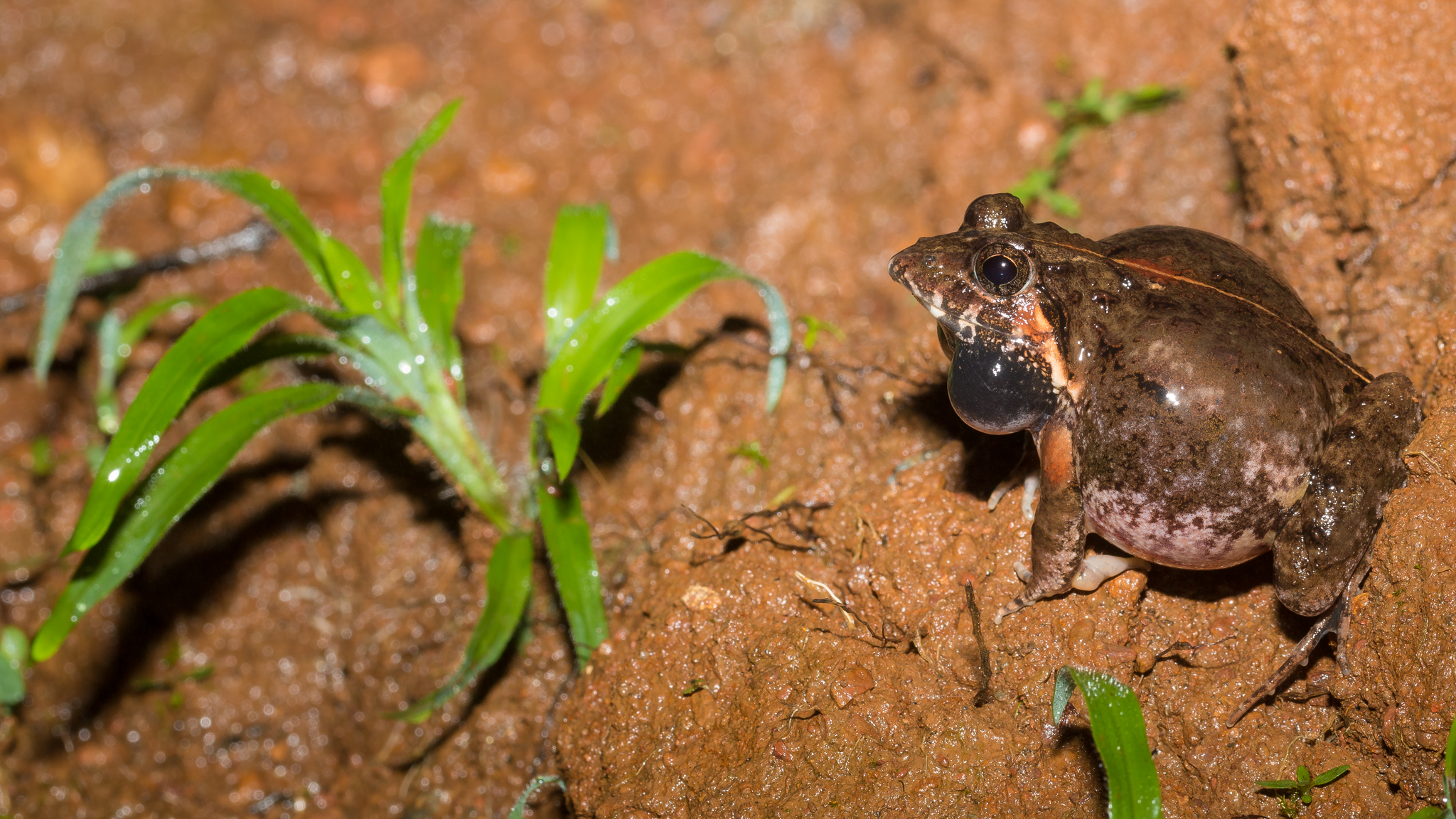
3. Preparing to vocalise - side view

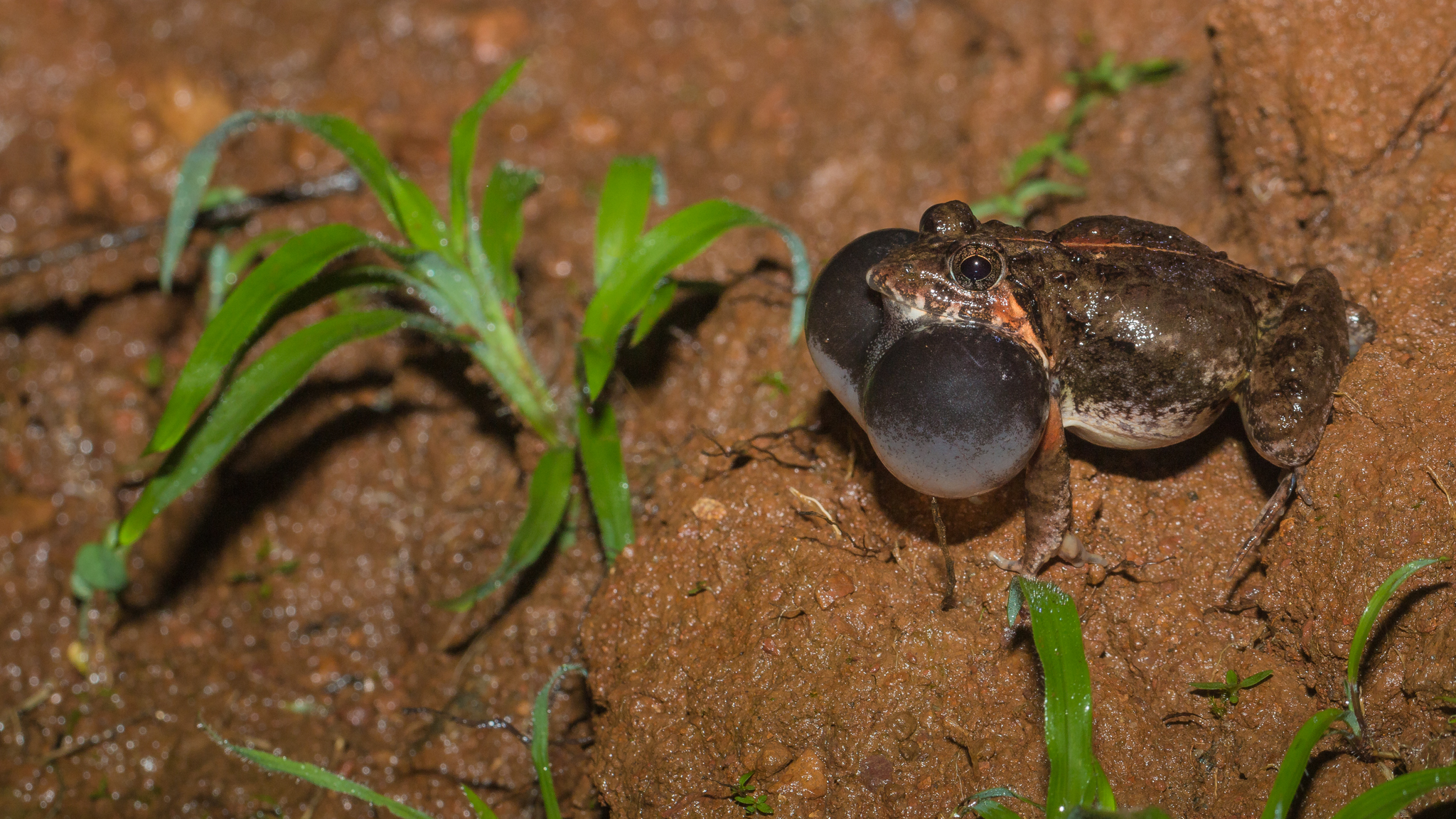
4. Vocalising side view
