= Fejervarya verruculosa =

Conservation status
- Least Concern (IUCN 3.1)

Scientific classification
- Kingdom: Animalia
- Phylum: Chordata
- Class: Amphibia
- Order: Anura
- Family: Dicroglossidae
- Genus: Fejervarya
- Species: F. verruculosa

Binomial name
- Fejervarya verruculosa (Roux, 1911)

Synonyms
- Rana tigrina var. verruculosa Roux, 1911

Species of amphibian

Fejervarya verruculosa (common name: Sundas wart frog) is a species of frog. It is found in the Lesser Sunda Islands of Indonesia and Timor-Leste. It is an abundant species found in paddy fields where it also breeds.
