= Fejervarya vittigera =

Conservation status
- Least Concern (IUCN 3.1)

Scientific classification
- Kingdom: Animalia
- Phylum: Chordata
- Class: Amphibia
- Order: Anura
- Family: Dicroglossidae
- Genus: Fejervarya
- Species: F. vittigera

Binomial name
- Fejervarya vittigera (Wiegmann, 1834)

Synonyms
- Rana vittigera Wiegmann, 1834

Species of amphibian

The Luzon wart frog (Fejervarya vittigera) is a species of frog in the family Dicroglossidae. It is endemic to the Philippines where it occurs on all the major islands. It is an abundant and common species occurring in a range of man-made habitats, such as agricultural areas, ditches, artificial ponds and lakes. It uses nearly any body of available water for breeding.
