= Fejervarya orissaensis =

Conservation status
- Least Concern (IUCN 3.1)

Scientific classification
- Kingdom: Animalia
- Phylum: Chordata
- Class: Amphibia
- Order: Anura
- Family: Dicroglossidae
- Genus: Fejervarya
- Species: F. orissaensis

Binomial name
- Fejervarya orissaensis (Dutta, 1997)

Synonyms
- Limnonectes orissaensis Dutta, 1997

Species of amphibian

Fejervarya orissaensis (common name: Orissa frog) is a species of frog that is endemic to Orissa state in eastern India. It is also found in Nepal, Myanmar, Thailand, and Bangladesh.

== Habitat ==
This frog is known from grasslands and farms that have ponds, streams, and other suitable wetlands nearby. It not only tolerates human-disturbed habitats but seems to prefer them. Scientists observed the frog no higher than 700 m (2,300 ft) above sea level.

This frog has been found in many protected parks, for example Chandaka Wildlife Sanctuary, Simlipal Tiger Reserve, Kanger Ghati National Park, Rajaji National Park, Sanjay National Park, and Nauradehi Wildlife Sanctuary.

== Reproduction ==
The female frog lays eggs in temporary pools of rainwater, where the tadpoles develop.

== Threats ==
The IUCN classifies this frog as least concern of extinction. Its largest known threat is pollution from agrochemicals: fertilizers and pesticides.
