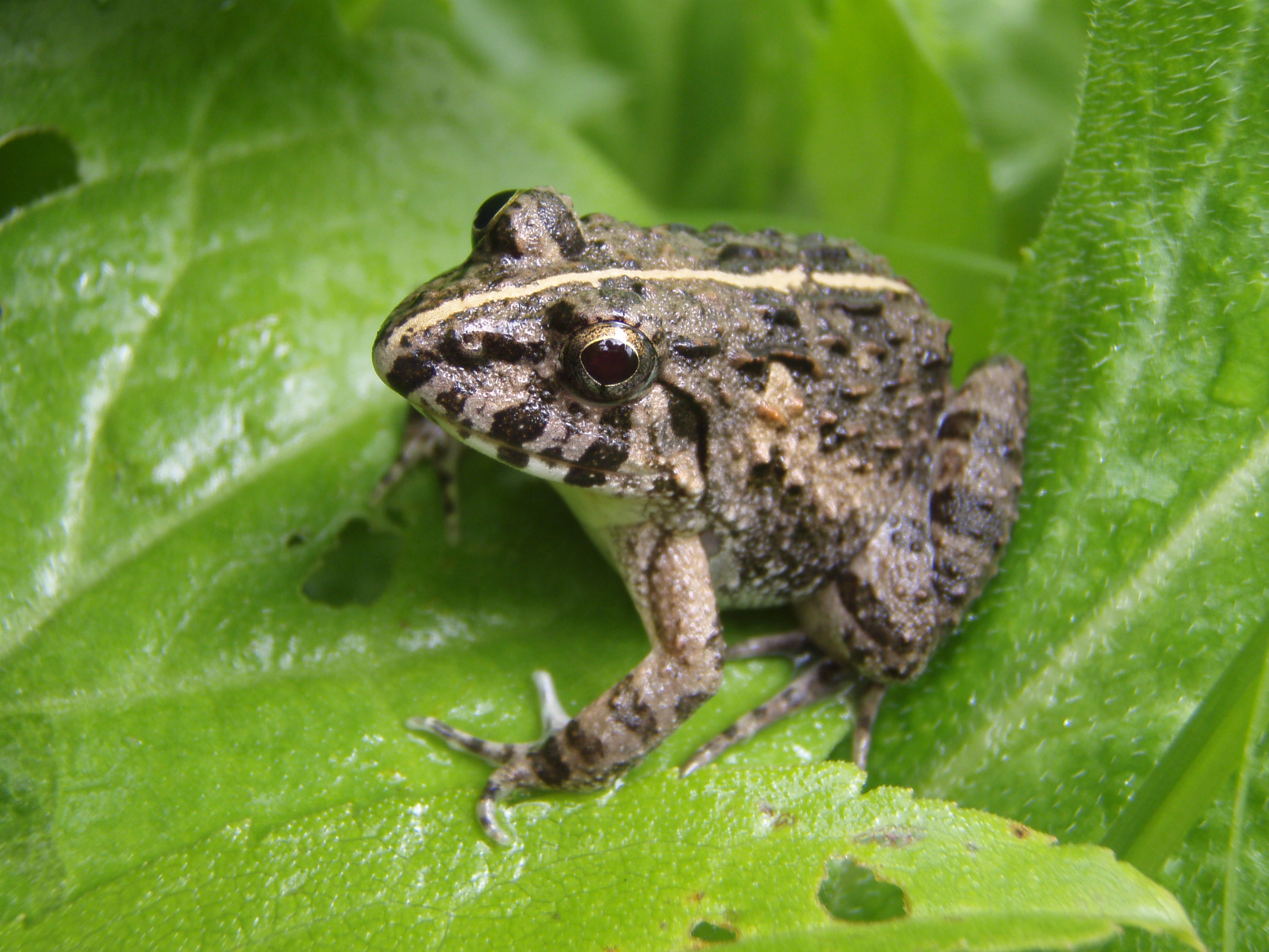

Conservation status
- Data Deficient (IUCN 3.1)

Scientific classification
- Kingdom: Animalia
- Phylum: Chordata
- Class: Amphibia
- Order: Anura
- Family: Dicroglossidae
- Genus: Fejervarya
- Species: F. kawamurai

Binomial name
- Fejervarya kawamurai Djong, Matsui, Kuramoto, Nishioka & Sumida, 2011

= Fejervarya kawamurai =

Species of frog

Fejervarya kawamurai is a species of frog in the family Dicroglossidae. It is endemic to Taiwan, Japan (Ryukyu Islands and Honshu), and China. It belongs to the Fejervarya limnocharis species complex.

== Description ==
F. kawamurai is a relatively small species of paddy frog. Males have a snout-vent length of 36–41 mm, and females are slightly larger at 40–47 mm.

== Distribution and habitat ==
F. kawamurai is widespread species, ranging across central and eastern China, western Taiwan, much of South Korea, and, in Japan, the western part of Honshu, Shikoku, Kyushu, and the Ryukyu Islands, apart from the Sakishima Islands.

It has also recently invaded the Kanto region of Japan. Its presence there was first recorded in 1997, and it may have been accidentally introduced by way of imported soil or crop seeds. There is also speculation that global warming may be enabling its spread to previously unliveable areas.

This species is most commonly found in paddy fields, and rarely ventures into other habitats.

== Reproduction and development ==
This frog lays multiple clutches of eggs during breeding and its tadpoles undergo metamorphosis swiftly after hatching.

F. kawamurai‘s breeding season lasts from the first half of May to the first half of August, according to surveys in the Kanagawa Prefecture of Central Japan. But this frog’s distribution is broad, ranging across a variety of climates including the subtropical Ryukyu Islands, where populations of the species may have very different life histories.

In central Japan, both sexes finish metamorphosis and begin to emerge in the first half of July, reaching adult body size by August. Males reach sexual maturity immediately after overwintering, and females mature slightly later, during the first half of May. Surveyed populations of F. kawamurai consisted mostly of young individuals that metamorphosed less than a year prior.

== Diet and feeding behaviour ==
The analysis of this frog’s stomach contents suggests that it is a generalist predator that primarily consumes invertebrates. However, there have also been observations of adult and juvenile F. kawamurai, eating other frogs; in one case, a juvenile F. kawamurai fully swallowed a juvenile Hyla japonica, while in other cases prey was partially swallowed, but later released. Another event was recorded where two F. kawamurai were seen competing over a worm by pulling at either end.

Most metamorphosed frogs hunt live prey. However, a 2016 study reported the first case of scavenging behaviour in the genus Fejervarya and the family Dicroglossidae. An adult F. kawamurai was observed feeding on the dead body of a Pelophylax nigromaculatus at the edge of a rice patty in central Japan.

== Sources ==
- Djong, Matsui, Kuramoto, Nishioka & Sumida, 2011 : A new species of the Fejervarya limnocharis complex from Japan (Anura, Dicroglossidae). Zoological Science, vol. 28, p. 922-929 (original text).
- http://research.amnh.org/vz/herpetology/amphibia/Amphibia/Anura/Dicroglossidae/Dicroglossinae/Fejervarya/Fejervarya-kawamurai
