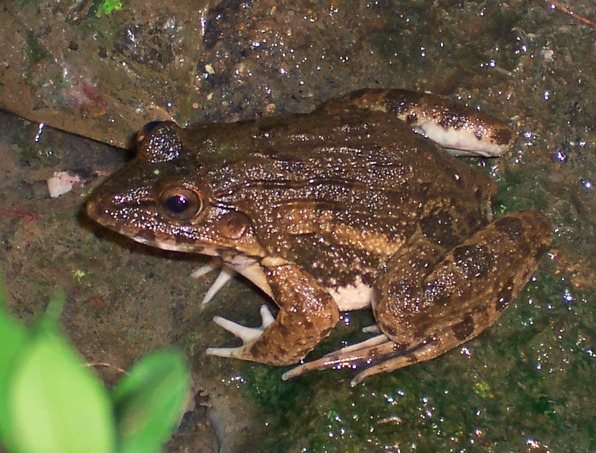
- Fejervarya cancrivora from Bogor, West Java

Conservation status
- Least Concern (IUCN 3.1)

Scientific classification
- Kingdom: Animalia
- Phylum: Chordata
- Class: Amphibia
- Order: Anura
- Family: Dicroglossidae
- Genus: Fejervarya
- Species: F. cancrivora

Binomial name
- Fejervarya cancrivora (Gravenhorst, 1829)

Synonyms
- Rana cancrivora Gravenhorst, 1829; Rana cancrivora ssp. raja Smith, 1930; Fejervarya raja (Smith, 1930)

= Crab-eating frog =

Species of amphibian

The crab-eating frog (Fejervarya cancrivora) is a frog native to south-eastern Asia including Taiwan, China, Sumatra in Indonesia, the Philippines and more rarely as far west as Orissa in India. It has also been introduced to Guam, most likely from Taiwan. It inhabits mangrove swamps and marshes and is one of 144 known modern amphibians which can tolerate brief excursions into seawater, and is possibly the only extant marine amphibian.

This frog can tolerate marine environments (immersion in sea water for brief periods or brackish water for extended periods) by increasing urea production and retention, and by remaining slightly hyperosmotic within urea and sodium flux. Adults can survive in salt water with salinity as high as 2.8%, and tadpoles can survive salinities as high as 3.9%.

== Diet ==
The food sources of the crab-eating frog are mainly determined by the locally available prey. Near fresh water, its diet consists largely of insects. But in an environment with brackish water, small crustaceans, including crabs, form the main part. Species from Taiwan are known to eat pearl crabs found in mangrove swamps.

== Human consumption ==
In Southeast Asia, the crab-eating frog is locally hunted for food and is often farmed for its edible legs, including in Java, Indonesia, where the dish is known as swikee.

== See also ==
- Cuban tree frog
- Trematosauroidea (an extinct batrachomorph radiation that independently adopted a marine mode of life)
