= Fejervarya multistriata =

Conservation status
- Least Concern (IUCN 3.1)

Scientific classification
- Kingdom: Animalia
- Phylum: Chordata
- Class: Amphibia
- Order: Anura
- Family: Dicroglossidae
- Genus: Fejervarya
- Species: F. multistriata

Binomial name
- Fejervarya multistriata (Hallowell, 1861)

Synonyms
- Rana gracilis Wiegmann, 1834 (non Gravenhorst, 1829: preoccupied); Rana gracilis Bourret, 1927 (non Gravenhorst, 1829: preoccupied); Rana multistriata Hallowell, 1861

Species of amphibian

Fejervarya multistriata (common name: Hong Kong paddy frog or simply paddy frog) is a species of frog in the family Dicroglossidae. It is found in southern China (from Yuannan to Guangdong and Hainan) and in Taiwan, but its range likely extends to Vietnam, Laos, Thailand, and Myanmar.

The taxonomy of Fejervarya multistriata and related frogs in China is complicated and not fully settled. What was formerly referred to as Fejervarya limnocharis is now considered to consist of the more southern Fejervarya multistriata and the more northern Fejervarya kawamurai. Accounts on Fejervarya limnocharis represent either Fejervarya multistriata or Fejervarya kawamurai, whereas accounts on Fejervarya multistriata could represent Fejervarya kawamurai described as late as in 2011.
