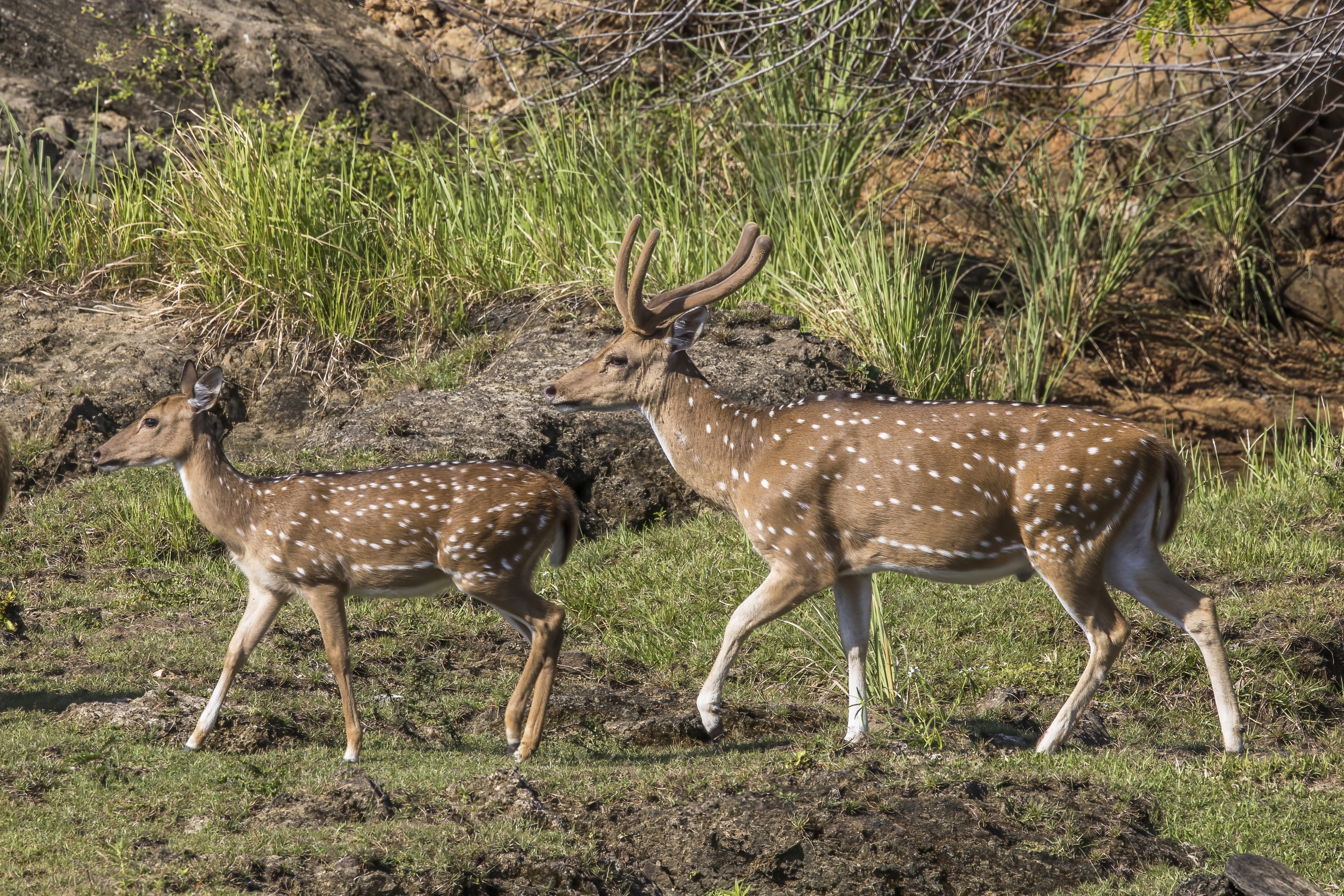
- female (left) and male in velvet Yala National Park Block 5

Scientific classification
- Kingdom: Animalia
- Phylum: Chordata
- Class: Mammalia
- Order: Artiodactyla
- Family: Cervidae
- Genus: Axis
- Species: A. axis
- Subspecies: A. a. ceylonensis

Trinomial name
- Axis axis ceylonensis (Fischer, 1829)

= Sri Lankan axis deer =

Subspecies of deer

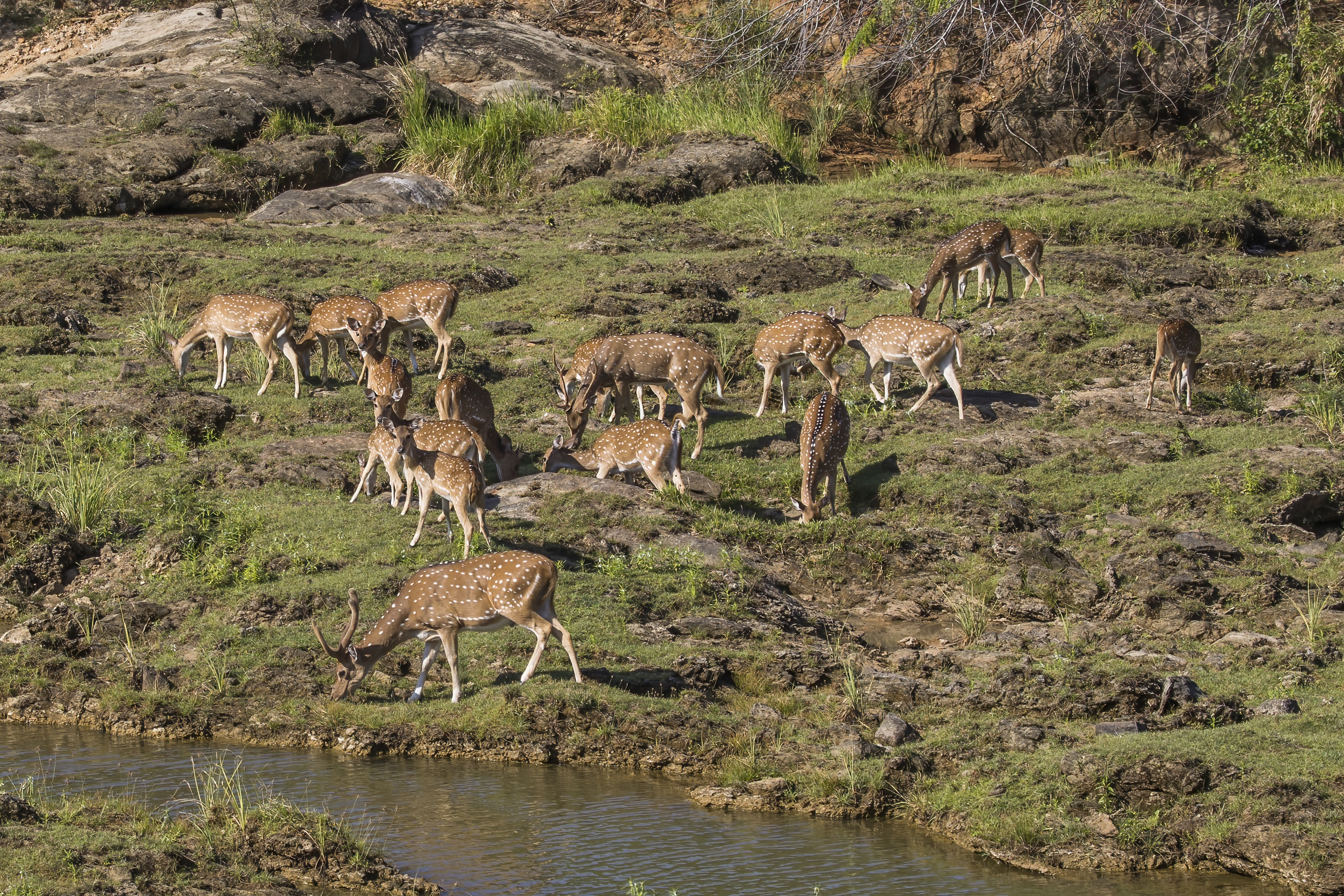
Females and two males. The male in the foreground has velvet antlers and the male in the centre of the herd has hard antlers

The Sri Lankan axis deer (Axis axis ceylonensis) or Ceylon spotted deer is a subspecies of axis deer (Axis axis) that inhabits only Sri Lanka. The name chital is not used in Sri Lanka. Its validity is disputed, and some maintain that the axis deer is monotypic (i.e., has no subspecies).

== Food ==
Sri Lankan axis deer are active primarily during early morning and again during the evening, but they are commonly observed near waterholes anytime. The Sri Lankan axis deer eats primarily grasses, but it also eats fallen fruits and leaves. The Sri Lankan axis deer graze closely with langur, peacock, wild buffalo, and sambar deer. They usually live in groups of between 10 and 60 animals, though herds may include up to 100 animals.

Axis deer are important prey for the Sri Lankan leopard. It is also prey for sloth bears, jackals, and crocodiles.

== Habitat range and conservation status ==
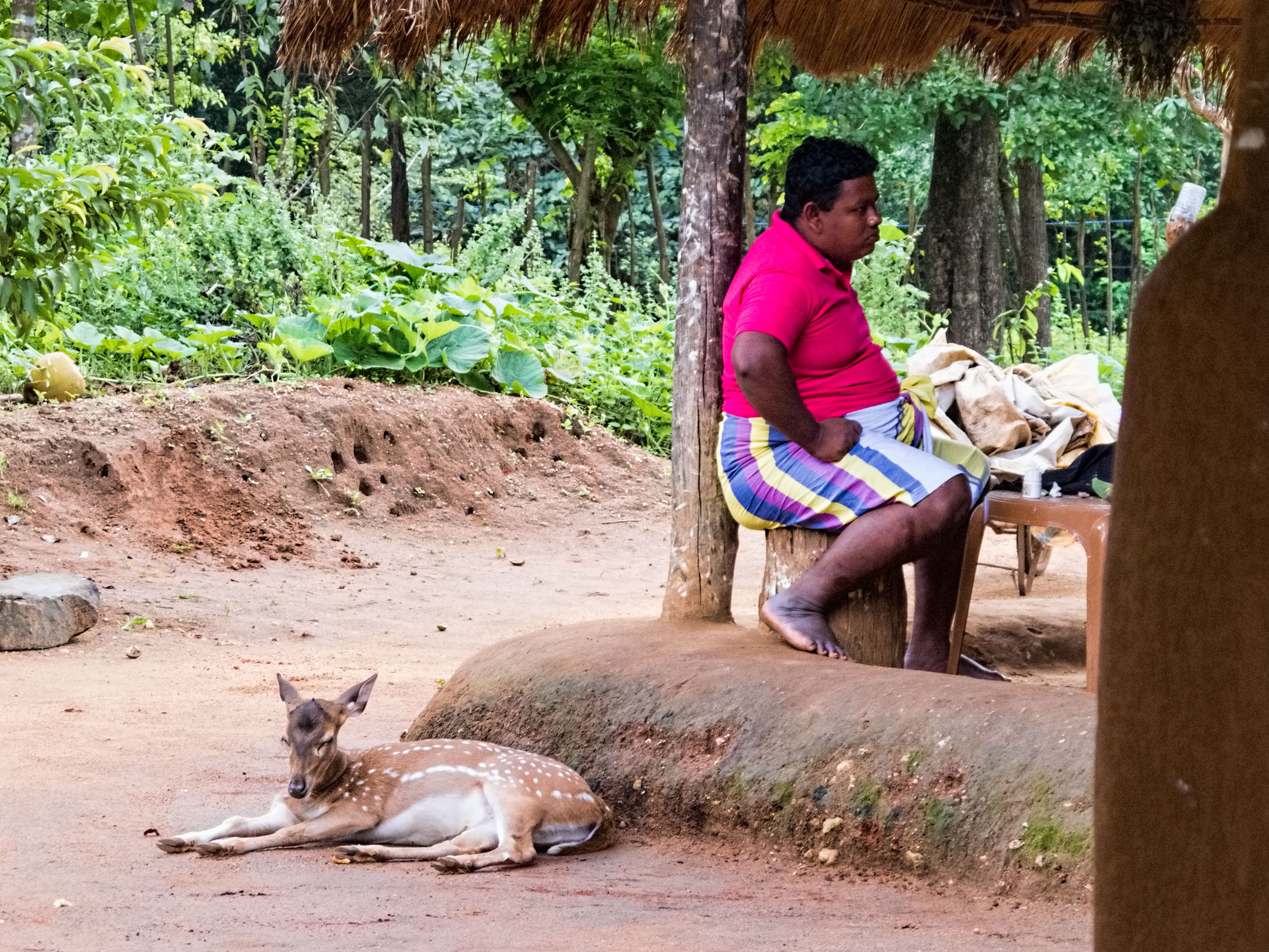
A pet deer at the Veddah village outside the chief's house

These deer inhabit lowland dry forests, savannas, and shrub lands. Very rarely, these deer inhabit dry mountain areas.

Unlike the mainland axis deer (Axis axis) which is plentiful, Sri Lankan axis deer populations are considered to be vulnerable. Threats include hunting for meat and deforestation. Historically, axis deer were found in very large numbers in the entire dry zone of Sri Lanka, but these numbers have been significantly reduced. Today several thousand of these deer are found in Sri Lanka. Sri Lankan axis deer are mainly found in protected areas in the dry zone, with a small number of herds living outside the protected forest areas. Large herds can be found only in protected areas.

They can be seen on the streets or beaches of Trincomalee. Particularly, they wander near the walls of Fort Fredrick.

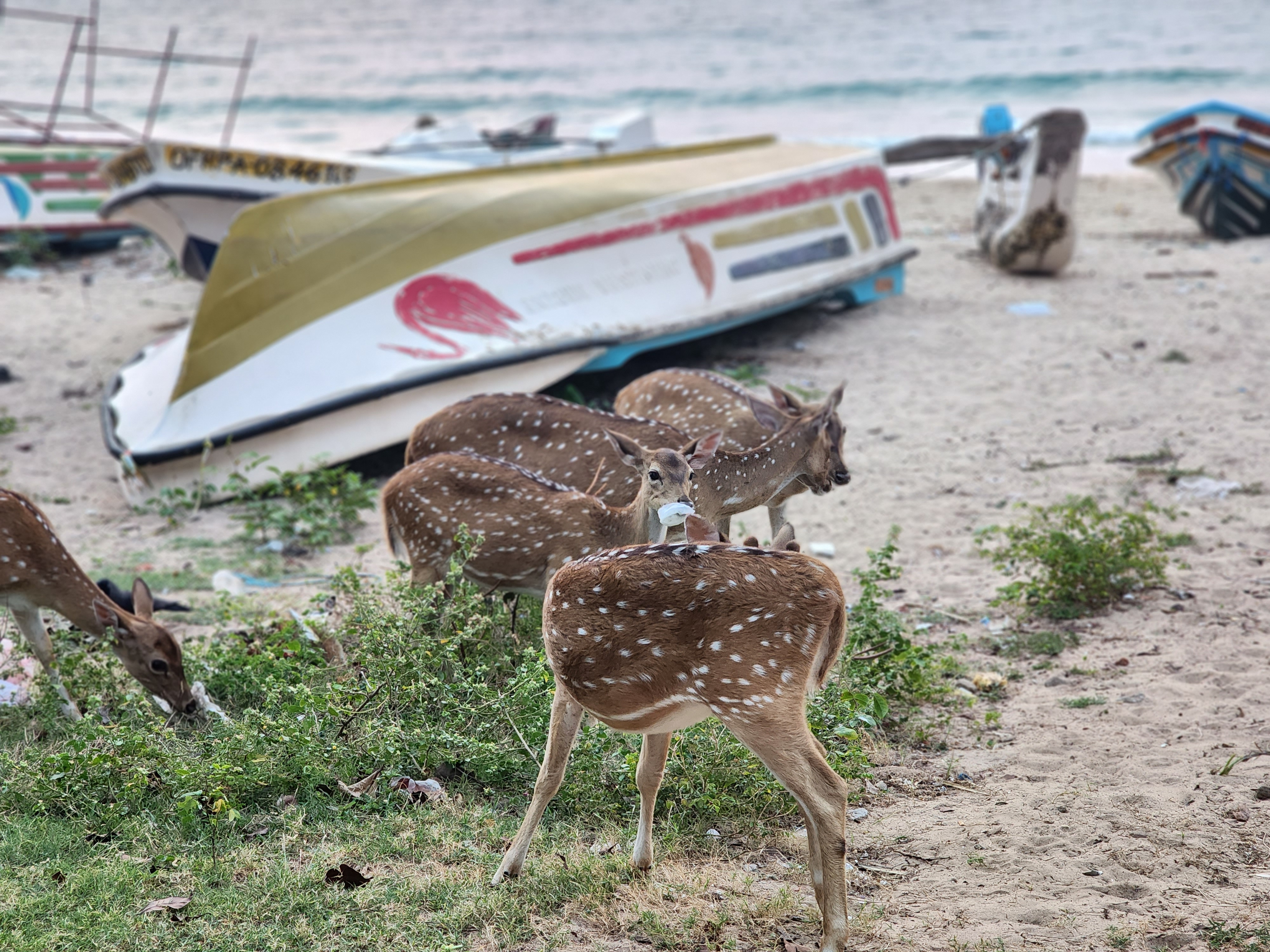
Baby deers on a beach near the Trincomalee
