= Fejervarya pulla =

Conservation status
- Data Deficient (IUCN 3.1)

Scientific classification
- Kingdom: Animalia
- Phylum: Chordata
- Class: Amphibia
- Order: Anura
- Family: Dicroglossidae
- Genus: Fejervarya
- Species: F. pulla

Binomial name
- Fejervarya pulla (Stoliczka, 1870)

Synonyms
- Rana gracilis var. pulla Stoliczka, 1870

Species of frog

Fejervarya pulla is a species of frog in the family Dicroglossidae. It is endemic to Malaysia and only known from its type locality, Penang Hill. Little is known about this species that might even belong to Hoplobatrachus instead of Fejervarya.
