= Surfing in Sri Lanka =

- Country: Sri Lanka
- Governing body: Sri Lanka Surfing Federation
- National team: Sri Lanka national surf team

International competitions
- World Surf League

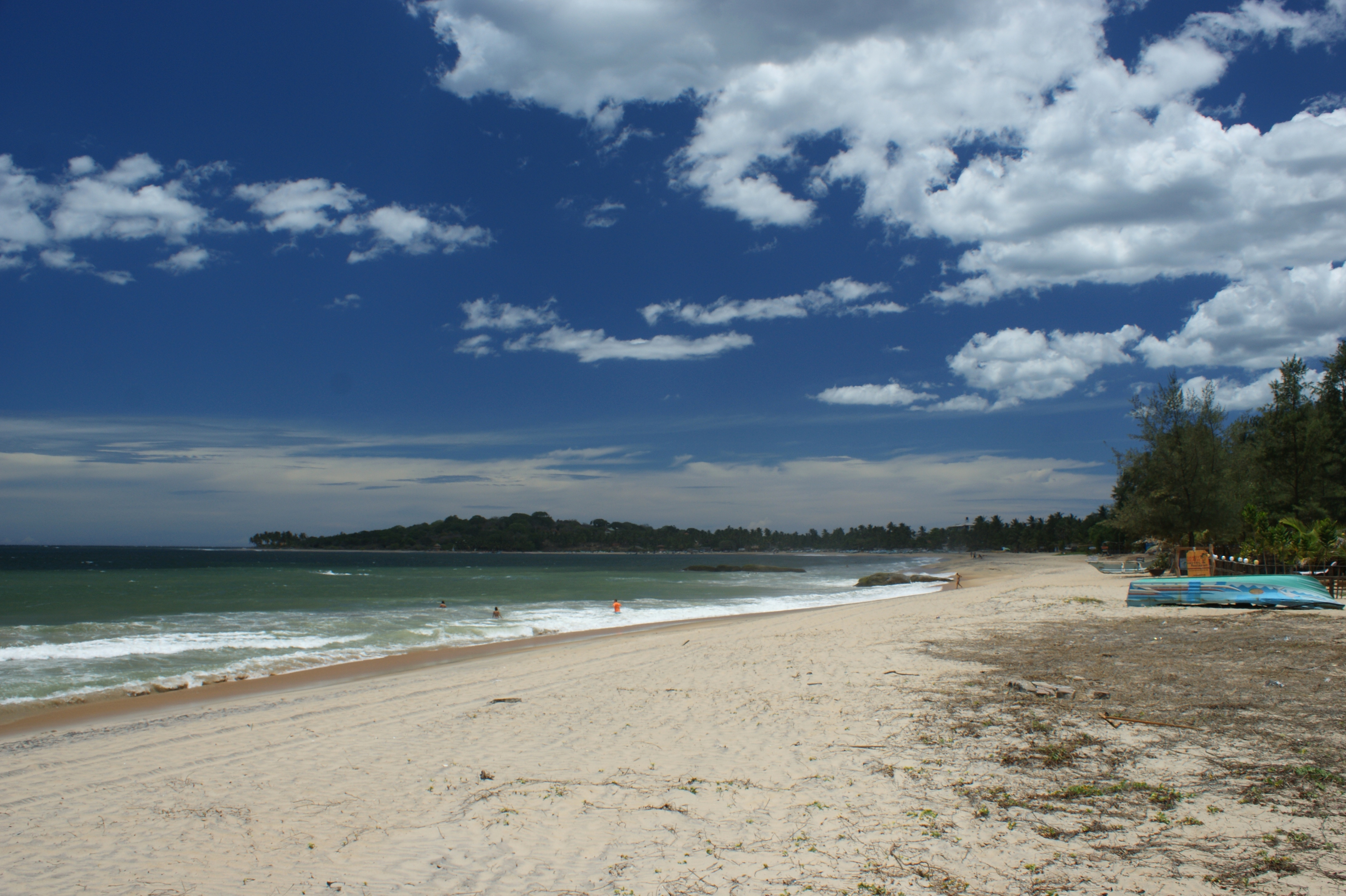
Arugam Bay one of the finest surf locations

Surfing in Sri Lanka is one of the popular sports in Sri Lanka among foreign tourists despite not being popular among the Sri Lankan locals. Surfing in Sri Lanka dates back to early 1960s. The country has many beaches for surfing, especially in the southern and eastern regions. Places such as Arugam Bay, Hikkaduwa, Weligama, Mirissa and Unawatuna are popular surf spots in Sri Lanka and among tourists. The Tourism in Sri Lanka is also very closely related to the sport of surfing and the Sri Lanka Tourism Promotion Bureau considers the sport of surfing as one of the measures of attracting tourists.

== History ==
=== Early years ===
Surfing was introduced to Sri Lanka somewhere around the 1960s when American surfer Rusty Miller and three of his close friends came to Sri Lanka on a holiday trip to experience surf in Sri Lankan shores.

In 1993, Hikkaduwa hosted the first ever Sri Lankan local surfing competition and the tournament was successfully staged by Channa Navaratne along with a small bunch of Americans to kick start an interest among locals on the sport. However, his intention was short-lived, mainly due to the 26 year long civil war which ended in 2009. During the civil war, the foreigners were unable to engage in surfing due to security reasons when popular surfing spots such as Arugam Bay and Pasikudah were also engulfed by the terror threats.

=== Post Civil War ===
The Sri Lankan Surf Federation was established in 2017 and the inaugural edition of the National Surf Championship was held in 2018. The winner of the 2018 Sri Lankan National Surf Championship went onto qualify and participate at the 2019 ISA World Surfing Games which was held in Japan. It also marked the first ever instance that a delegation from Sri Lanka had competed in the World Surfing Games. Sri Lanka alongside Lebanon, Thailand and American Samoa also made their debuts at the World Surfing Games during the 2019 edition.

The Sri Lankan surf national team also toured India in 2018 and made little progress when they gained second and third places in the Cove-Long Point Surfing Championships in Chennai. During when surfing and tourism were adversely affected due to the impact of the COVID-19 pandemic, SLT Mobitel came in as the official telecommunications partner for the National Surf Championship 2020 in a bid to revive the tourism sector.

In late 2018, the Arugam Bay Surf Club officially became the all-female surf club of Sri Lanka when it registered through the Surfing Federation of Sri Lanka. Shamali Sanjaya who is deemed to be the first Sri Lankan native local female surfer is currently serving as the president of Arugam Bay Girls Surf Club. Shamali played an influential role in setting up an all-female surf club in Arugam Bay and she apparently played a vital role in changing the stereotype regarding the participation Sri Lankan women in surfing by being in the forefront of the development and empowerment of female surfers especially in a country like Sri Lanka which has a conservative society. The first ever women-only category surfing competition took place in Arugam Bay in 2020.

However, Sri Lankan surfing endured a major setback in July 2021 when the sports ministry issued an extraordinary gazette to suspend the registration of Surfing Federation of Sri Lanka along with four other sports federations. In July 2021, the government launched a programme to transform Arugam Bay into a worldwide destination for wind surfing.

Red Bull Ride My Wave, an International Open Surfing Championship is also conducted in Sri Lanka which is sponsored by Red Bull Sri Lanka and several local and international surfers compete in the competition annually. Sri Lankan local surfers Lakshitha Madushan and Nikita Rob were crowned as “King of the Wave” and “Queen of the Wave” respectively in the Red Bull Ride My Wave 2022 contest.

== Surfing spots ==
=== Arugam Bay ===
Arugam Bay is the most popular surf spot and is also the only international surf competition venue in Sri Lanka. It is also rated as one of the top ten surf destinations in the world. It has also hosted most of the international surfing competitions in Sri Lanka since 2004. Arugam Bay has also notably hosted two Pro Surf League competitions as part of the World Surf League in 2011 and in 2019. Most notably, Arugam Bay hosted the So Sri Lanka Pro 2019 event which was also the first major international competition to be held in Sri Lanka in 2019 since the Easter Sunday bombings. The event was won by Australia's Mitch Parkinson and Indonesia's Oney Anwar became runner-up.

In October 2018, the Arugam Bay Girls Surf Club registered with the Surfing Federation of Sri Lanka, making it Sri Lanka's first female surf club. As of October 2024, the club has 13 members, many of whom are certified instructors trained with support from the Australian government.

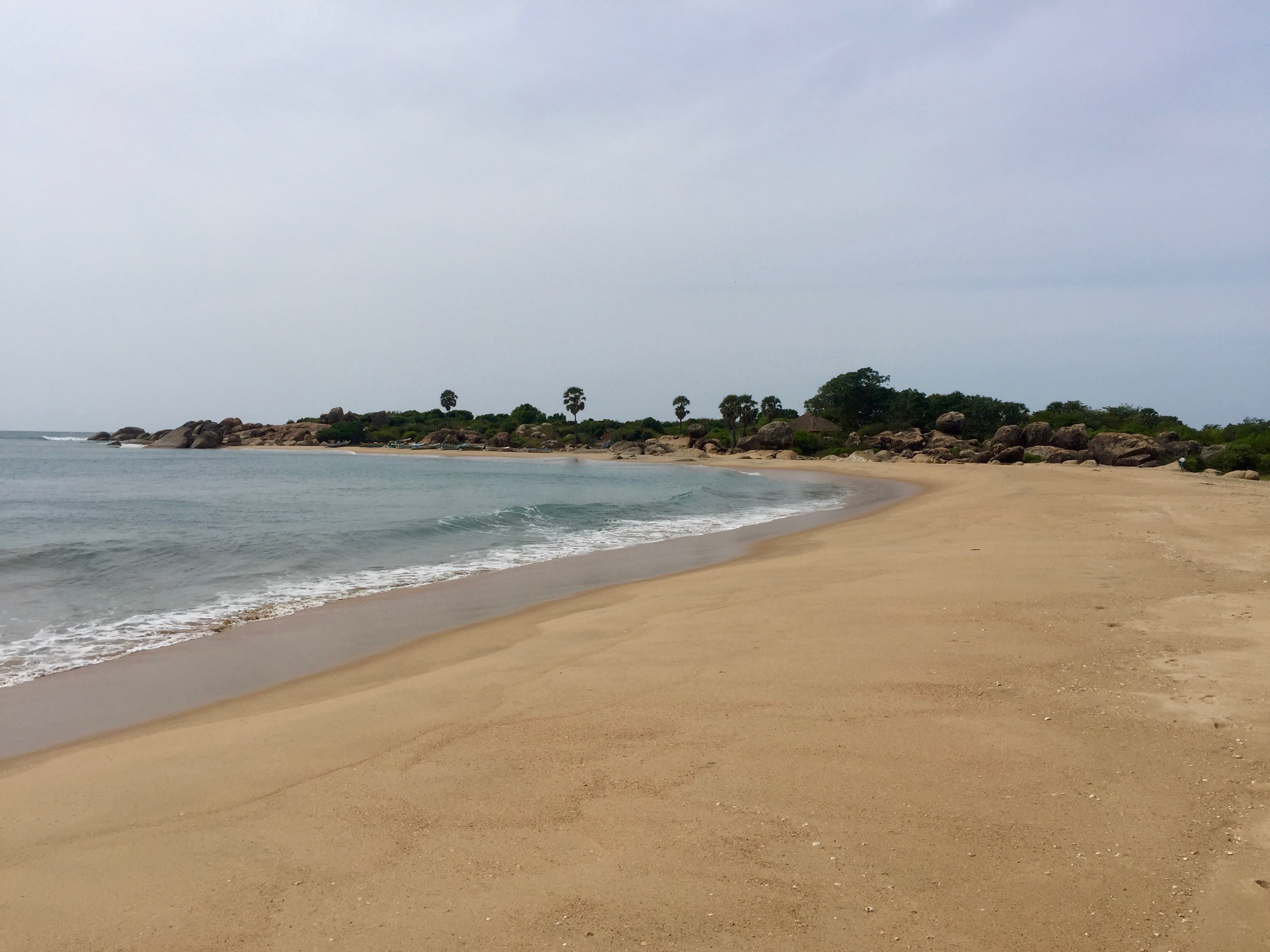
Whiskey Point in Arugam Bay

=== Hikkaduwa ===
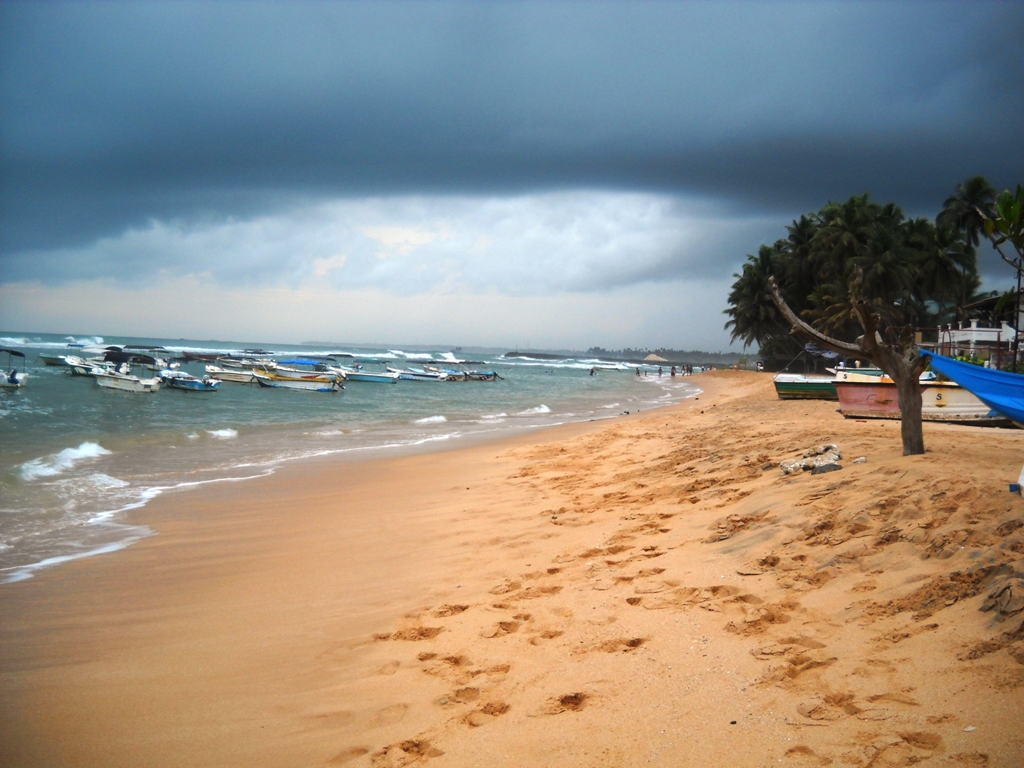
Hikkaduwa beeach with coral reefs

Hikkaduwa has become a mecca for Sri Lankan surfing. During the Sri Lanka surf season, Hikkaduwa surf attracts thousands between November and March with a mix of shore breaks and reefs for all levels. A part of the beach is known for its coral reefs, one of the three Marine National Parks in Sri Lanka. There’s a mixture of different breaks to pick from on the 1,000 metres or so of shoreline that’s occupied by Hikkaduwa. Generally speaking, going north makes things trickier. Meanwhile, the southernmost sands of Narigama Beach and Thiranagama Beach extend over 3 kilometers. This wide beach is calm with some luxury hotels and a few quality restaurants. Here are several surf spots there.

=== Mirissa ===
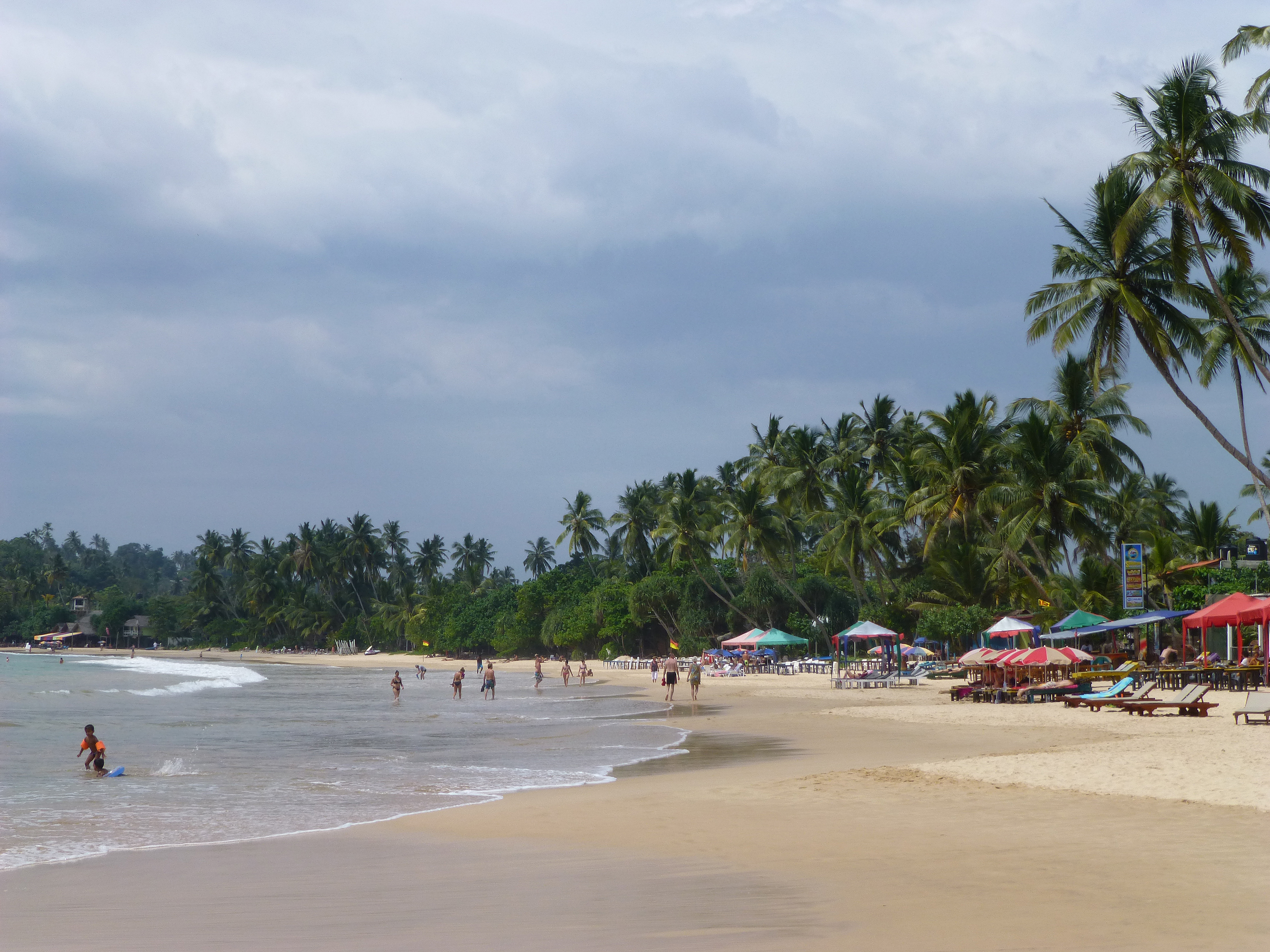
Mirissa beach

The areas such as Kabalana, Midigama, Weligama, Ahangama and Matara in Mirissa are notable spots for surfing.

== See also ==
- Sport in Sri Lanka
- Climate of Sri Lanka
- Tourism in Sri Lanka
