= List of beaches in Sri Lanka =

The following is a list of beaches in Sri Lanka, an island nation south of India in the Indian Ocean.

Beach	Image	Description	Location	District	Province
East Coast
Arugam Bay	Arugam Point at the Arugam Bay beach	Arugam Bay is located 317 km (197 mi) from Colombo and contains a wide beach with several fishing villages nearby. It is located in the dry zone of Sri Lanka's southeast coast. It has been identified as the best surfing beach in Sri Lanka and the fourth best in southeast Asia. Lahugal National Park and Yala East National Park are located within a 10–30 km (6.2–18.6 mi) radius from the Arugam Bay centre. Magul Maha Viharaya (Buddhist temple), Kudumbigala Temple (Buddhist temple), Shastrwela Buddhist Temple, Okanda Hindu Temple are all in the area.	Arugam Bay	Ampara District	Eastern Province
Batticaloa	Batticaloa	Batticaloa is a major city located in the Batticaloa district of the Eastern Province. The town sits on a strip of land with the Indian Ocean to the east and estuarine lagoons surrounding it. It is a popular snorkeling and scuba diving spot because of the rich coral along the coast. Batticaloa Lagoon is also known for its "singing fish" near the Kallady bridge, a couple kilometers from the town centre. The musical sound comes from a marine creature that resides in the waters of the lagoon.	Batticaloa	Batticaloa district	Eastern Province
Kalkudah Beach			Kalkudah	Batticaloa district	Eastern Province
Nilaveli Beach	Nilaveli Beach	Nilaveli is a beach resort town in the Trinco region and is only 4 km (2.5 mi) long. It is located 276 km (171 mi) from Colombo and 14 km (8.7 mi) from Trincomalee.	Nilaveli	Trincomalee District	Eastern Province
Pasikudah beach	Pasikudah beach	Kalkudah and Passekudah are two beaches located 34 km (21 mi) north of Batticaloa. Passekudah is a busy tourist spot with numerous luxury hotels and shallow beaches. In contrast, Kalkudah is mostly deserted due to the civil war and 2004 tsunami.	Pasikudah	Batticaloa district	Eastern Province
Trincomalee	Trincomalee Bay	Trincomalee is a deepwater harbor and is home to the beaches of Nilaveli, Uppuveli and the off-shore Pigeon Island. It is known as a whale watching destination and the seven hot springs at Kanniya are located only 8 km (5.0 mi) away. The Trincomalee district is considered a major Buddhist cultural and archaeological site.	<location>	Trincomalee District	Eastern Province
North Coast
Casuarina Beach	Casuarina Beach	Casuarina Beach is in Karainagar, Jaffna District about 20 km (12 mi) from Jaffna of Northern Province. It used to be a popular tourist destination, but tourist numbers have declined due to the Sri Lankan Civil War.	Karainagar	Jaffna District	Northern Province
Kilali Beach		Kilaaly Beach, also known as Kilali Beach, is located in the Jaffna District of the Northern Province. The region is very quiet and the beach is largely deserted.		Jaffna District	Northern Province
Vankalai		Vankalai is a major fishing village in Mannar, of Northern Province. The beach lacks water activities and is often scattered with trash due to fishing.	Vankalai	Mannar District	Northern Province
South Coast
Bentota Beach	Bentota Beach	Bentota is a city located 64 km (40 mi) south of Colombo and approximately 101 km (63 mi) south of Bandaranaike International Airport. It is largely a rural area and the land is dominated by tall coconut palm trees. It can be reached by the Colombo-Galle main road (A2) as well as the Colombo-Galle-Matara Southern Railway line.	Bentota	Galle District	Southern Province
Dickwella Beach	Dickwella Beach	Dickwella beach, also known as Dikwella or Dikwella South, is a small coastal town in the Matara district of Sri Lanka. It is located 22 km (14 mi) east of Matara. Sri Lanka's largest Buddhist statue is located in Dickwella as well. Many people swim along the shores of Dickwella beach because the waters are protected by headlands, reefs and sandbars.	Dickwella	Matara District	Southern Province
Hikkaduwa Beach	Hikkaduwa Beach	Hikkaduwa is a small town on the south coast of Sri Lanka about 14 km (8.7 mi) northwest of Galle. It is Sri Lanka's most developed beach resort, well known for surfing and sea turtles. The surrounding waters contain a coral sanctuary that is a large shallow body of water enclosed by a reef. There is also a small collection of small islets off the beach.	Hikkaduwa	Galle District	Southern Province
Koggala Beach	Stilt Farming	Koggala is a small village on Sri Lanka's south coast and is a well-known surfing destination. It is located 130 km (81 mi) south of Colombo. The Koggala River and Koggala Lake are also located in the area. The village is also known for the Martin Wickramasinghe Folk Art Museum.	Koggala	Galle District	Southern Province
Mirissa Beach	Panorama of Mirissa Beach	Mirissa is a beach located close to the southern tip of Sri Lanka, approximately 200 km (120 mi) from the equator, and 4 km (2.5 mi) southeast of Weligama, a town on the south coast of Sri Lanka. It is crescent-shaped and secluded. Coconut Tree Hill is located in the Mirissa beach and a popular tourist attraction.	Mirissa	Matara District	Southern Province
Polhena Beach	Beach at Matara	Polhena is a beach located in Matara and contains a 1.2 km (0.75 mi) long coral reef about 80 m (260 ft) off the shore. Because of this, the water near the shore is relatively calm and is a common spot for tourists to swim. Numerous people can be seen snorkelling, surfing and sunbathing along Polhena Beach. However, 90% of this fringing reef had died since the Tsunami and due to human intervention.	Polhena	Matara District	Southern Province
Tangalle Beach	Tangalle beach	Tangalle is a town located 35 km (22 mi) east of Matara and 195 km (121 mi) south of Colombo. It comprises several bays, including Goyambokka, Pallikkudawa, Medaketiya and Medilla. Tangalle is also known as a common swimming and diving destination. The name Tangalle is believed to be derived from ran-gala or golden rock.	Tangalle	Hambantota District	Southern Province
Thiranagama Beach	Thiranagama beach	Thiranagama is a village known for its luxury hotels including the only two 5-star hotels in Hikkaduwa region (Haritha Villas and Riff Hotel). The beach is one of the most expansive one in the South West of Sri Lanka, made up of Narigama beach and Thiranagama beach. Extending over 3 km (1.9 mi), this wide beach is calm with some luxury hotels and a few quality restaurants.	Thiranagama	Galle District	Southern Province
Unawatuna Beach	Unawatuna Beach	Unawatuna is a city located 140 km (87 mi) south of Colombo. The beach is semi-circular and stretches approximately 1 km (0.62 mi) in length. Unawatuna is also known for its sea turtle population and tourists are able to witness them laying eggs along the shore at various times during the year. Although Unawatuna suffered heavily in the 2004 Indian Ocean tsunami, it was rebuilt quickly and tourist activity resumed.	Unawatuna	Galle District	Southern Province
Weligama Beach	Weligama Beach	Weligama is a small fishing town located about 30 km (19 mi) east of Galle. It is relatively quiet and is located around a broad bay. The name Weligama is translated to Sandy Village, and describes the surrounding landscape. The beach is also known for its stilt fishermen. Weligama can be reached by the main A2 Colombo-Galle-Matara motor way, the Southern Expressway and the Colombo-Matara Railway line.	Weligama Beach	Matara District	Southern Province
West Coast
Alankuda Beach	Alankuda Beach	Alankuda Beach 150 km (93 mi) north of Colombo is located on the west coast of Kalpitiya peninsula. The village is mostly focused on agriculture, so there is just a few fisherman and the beach is usually empty. Great for walking, swimming, diving, kitesurfing, sunset watching or dolphin and whale watching trips. The beach goes from the Alankuda village up to St. Anne's shrine about 6 km (3.7 mi) north. There are very few settlements on the beach, except Udekki, Dolphin Beach Resort, Palagama and Dune Towers resorts.	Kalpitiya	Puttalam	North Western Province
Beruwala Beach	Beruwala	Beruwala is a city located 55 km (34 mi) south of Colombo and 92 km (57 mi) south of Bandaranaike International Airport. It is the first main beach resort in the south western coastal belt and can be reached by the main Colombo-Galle motor road (A2) as well as the Southern Coastal Railway line. It is also a large fishing centre.	Beruwala	Kalutara District	Western Province
Kalpitiya Beach	Sunset at Kalpitiya beach	Kalpitiya is a fishing village that is located on the western coast of Sri Lanka 170 km (110 mi) .The beaches are remote and uncrowded The major activities are centred around the lagoon, the wind is suitable for kite surfing and windsurfing. It is also one of the spots from where whale and dolphin watching trips can be undertaken.	Kalpitiya	Puttalam	North Western Province
Kalutara	Sunset at Kalutara	Kalutara is a city located 43 km (27 mi) from Colombo, the commercial capital of Sri Lanka. It has a tropical climate and beaches lined with palm trees. During colonial times, it was a prominent spice trading centre, and still contains a historic nature. It is home to the world's only hollow Buddhist Shrine (Kalutara Chaitya) and Richmond Castle, a plantation mansion.	Kalutara	Kalutara District	Western Province
Mount-Lavinia	Mount Lavinia Beach	Mount Lavinia is a city located 12 km (7.5 mi) from Colombo, the commercial capital of Sri Lanka. It is considered a middle-class and mostly residential suburb of Colombo. The city is known for its "Golden Mile" of beaches, making it a popular tourism location. Mount Lavinia's name comes from Sir Thomas Maitland who was the Governor General of Ceylon from 1805 to 1811. He fell in love with a local mestizo dancer, Lovina, at his welcoming party on the island and had a secret affair with her for a short period of time.	Mount Lavinia	Colombo District	Western Province
Negombo Beach	Negombo beach	Negombo is a beach town located 7 km (4.3 mi) from Bandaranaike International Airport and approximately 37 km (23 mi) from Colombo, the commercial capital of Sri Lanka It is also located at the mouth of the Negombo lagoon. The town's economy is based largely on tourism and the fishing industry, as it is home to wide beaches and a calm sea.	Negombo	Gampaha District	Western Province

== See also ==
- List of beaches
