= Edwards Pillar =

Edwards Pillar may refer to:

- Edwards Pillar, Antarctica
- Edward's Pillar, Sri Lanka
