= Coconut Tree Hill =

Lateritic headland in Mirissa, Sri Lanka

- Headland
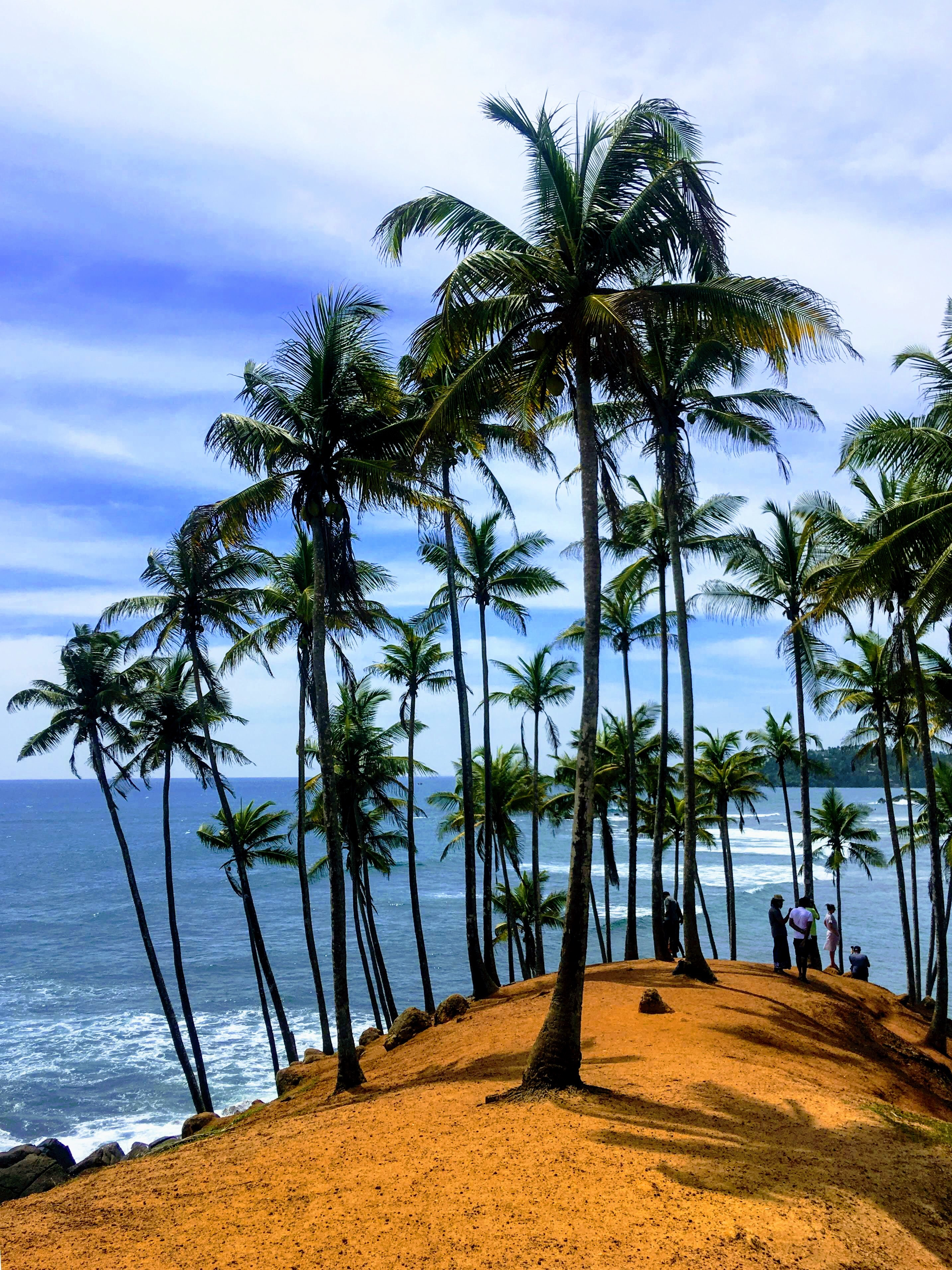
- Coconut Tree Hill is a lateritic headland in Southern Sri Lanka

- Location in Sri Lanka
- Coordinates: 5°56′21.4″N 80°28′05.1″E
- Location: Mirissa, Sri Lanka

Coconut Tree Hill is a lateritic headland in Mirissa, Sri Lanka located adjacent to the Indian Ocean. It is a popular tourist destination and is located at a headland with a coconut plantation. Coconut Tree Hill, despite being located on privately owned lands, is one of the most Instagrammed locations in Sri Lanka. In 1881, Ernst Haeckel portrayed Mirissa "red cliffs" in the sunset in his book, A visit to Ceylon and described "they seem to burn like coal...". The hill has been recommended as a place to watch the sunrise. The hill is located on the Mirissa beach which is contiguous to Weligama across the Weligama bay. Mirissa beach has been described as one of the "secret beaches" in the world.

== 2021 fencing off ==
In January 2021, a controversy arose after one of the two landowners of the hill built a fence across their part of the hill. Since the fence was erected without prior approval from the Urban Development Authority and the Coast Conservation Department, the owner of the land was ordered to demolish the fence. After a social media outrage, then prime minister Mahinda Rajapaksa was made aware of the situation. The hill is about 400 perches in area, of which 320 perches are owned by a Sri Lankan and the balance is owned by a foreigner. It is the Sri Lankan landowner who constructed the fence. In February 2021 the hill was reopened for visitors.

== See also ==
- List of beaches in Sri Lanka
