= Nooit Gedacht Hotel =

Coordinates: 6.01385°N 80.24844°E

Nooit Gedacht Heritage Hotel
- Interactive map of the Nooit Gedacht Heritage Hotel area

General information
- Location: 182 Matara Road, Unawatuna, Sri Lanka
- Opening: 1981
- Owner: Parakrama Jayasundara

Technical details
- Floor count: 2

Design and construction
- Architect: Mangalanatha Architects

Other information
- Number of rooms: 38
- Number of restaurants: 1

Website
- nooitgedachtheritage.com

Nooit Gedacht Heritage Hotel is a three-star heritage hotel in Unawatuna, Sri Lanka, at the base of Rumassala Kanda.

== History ==
Nooit Gedacht, which means "never thought of", was built in 1735 as a country house for the Dutch Commandeur of Point de Galle, Casparus de Jong (Lord of Spanbroek). When he retired from his official position de Jong became a merchant, supplying spices to the Dutch East India Company but following the arrival of the British in 1796 the residence was purchased by Mudaliar Amerasinghe of Amerasinghe Walauwa from Unawatuna, who had served as an Interpreter Mudaliyar for the Dutch.

The house is on the site of the military camp established by the Dutch in March 1640, which was used as a base from which they laid siege to the Portuguese fort of Galle. The camp was selected due to its proximity to the initial landing site, a freshwater spring and for the protection offered by the overlooking mountain, Rumassala. The canal here was built by the Dutch, and it was used to transport spices and other items to warehouses in Galle Fort. Two watchtowers, similar to those found at the Galle Fort, were located on the boundary of the hotel's land, but they have since collapsed as a result of the blasting at the nearby stone quarry.

In 1942, during World War II, it was commandeered by the British Army and used as a logistics centre for the nearby Koggala Air Base. It was reclaimed by the original proprietors in 1948 and in 1981 it was converted into a private hotel.

== Architecture ==
The building has a Dutch-style facade with a long verandah flanked by a two storied Victorian-style edifice from British period. Inside the Dutch portion of the house has terracotta floors. In 2011 a modern two-storey extension to the hotel, with an additional swimming pool and bar was added for a cost of RS. 42 million, designed by Mangalanatha Architects.
