= Edward's Pillar =

Coordinates: 6°0′59″N 80°14′25″E

Edward's Pillar or Galle Tower is a masonry column, which was used as a trigonometrical altitude station, located on the summit of Rumassala Kanda in Unawatuna.

== Location ==
The 15.3 m (50 ft) high column is located upon the hill, 80.4 m (264 ft) above sea level. Originally painted white it also served as a leading navigational mark for vessels entering the western channel into Galle Harbour. The pillar was erected in 1875 by W. Burton of the Ceylon Survey Department for trigonometrical work. The station was originally recorded as "Top of Galle Tower or Gibson's Hill near Galle Harbour". Gibson's Hill, now known as Rumassala Kanda, was named after William Carmichael Gibson, the first English Master Attendant of Galle Harbour, who resided on the hill.

Some locals, incorrectly, believe that it was erected as a fake lighthouse during World War I or served as a military lookout.

On 6 July 2007, it was formally recognised by the Government as an Archaeological Protected Monument.

== See also ==
- Unawatuna Peace Pagoda
- Unawatuna
