= Weligama =

Weligama වැලිගම வெலிகமை
- Town
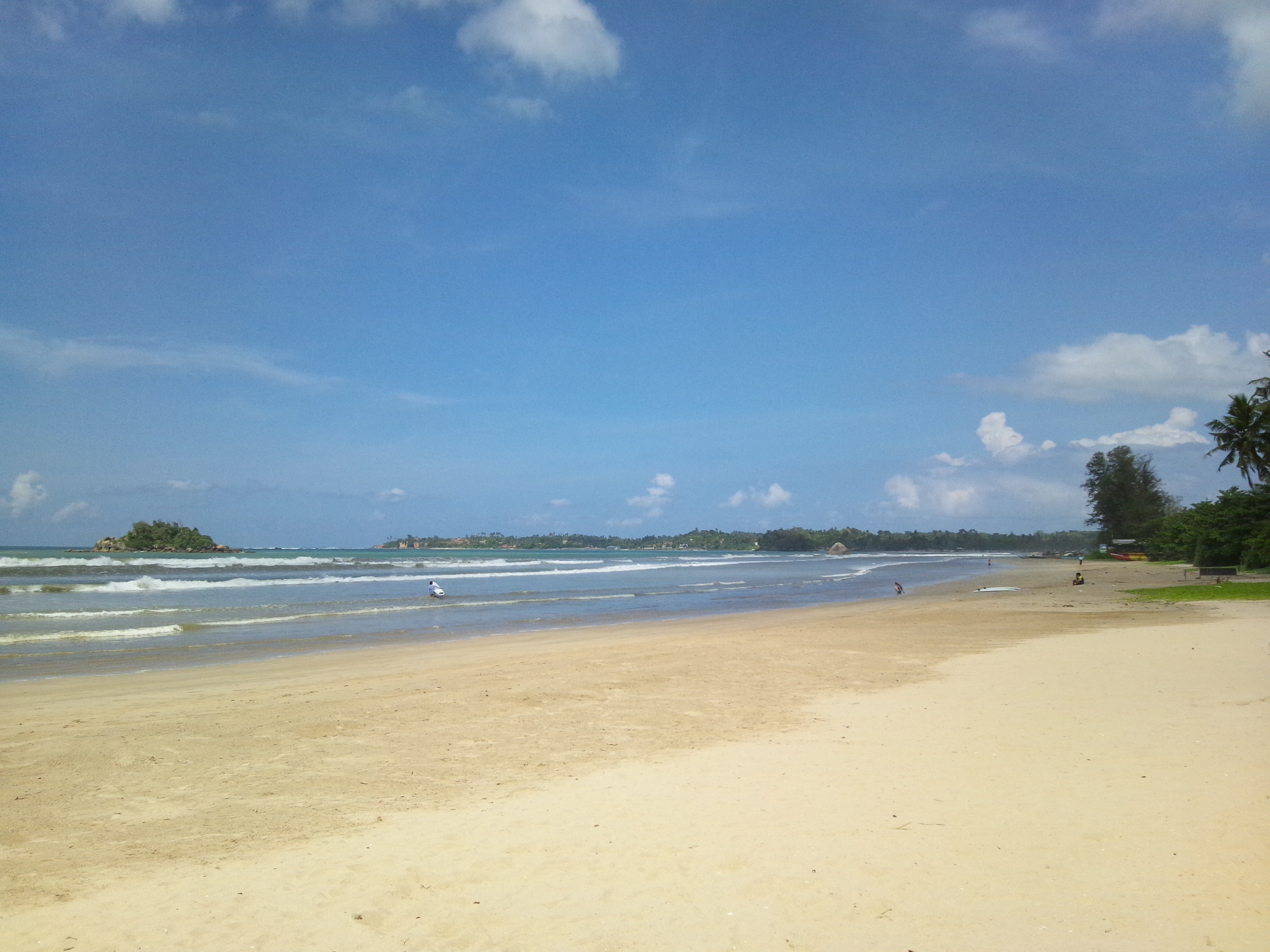
- Weligama Beach

- Location within Sri Lanka
- Coordinates: 5°58′26″N 80°25′46″E
- Country: Sri Lanka
- Province: Southern Province

Government
  - Chairman: Mohomad Husein Hajiyar Muhammad

Population (2012)
  - Total: 72,511
- Time zone: UTC+5:30 (Sri Lanka Standard Time Zone)
  - Summer (DST): UTC+6 (Summer time)

Weligama (Sinhala: වැලිගම, Tamil: வெலிகாமம்) is a town on the south coast of Sri Lanka, located in Matara District, Southern Province, Sri Lanka, governed by an Urban Council. The name Weligama, literally means "sandy village" which refers to the area's sandy sweep bay. It is approximately 144 kilometres (89 mi) south of Colombo and is situated at an elevation of 9 metres (30 ft) above the sea level.

== History ==
The main industries are tourism and fishing. Weligama is a popular tourist destination and hosts several boutique hotels including an off shore islet known as Taprobane, which houses a villa constructed by the French Count de Mauny, and is currently owned by Geoffrey Dobbs. It was the birthplace of the scholar monk Weligama Sri Sumangala.

Weligama was significantly affected by the tsunami caused by the 2004 Indian Ocean earthquake, with 15% of the area destroyed, with over 2,200 houses damaged or washed away, and 469 reported deaths.

There are a number of sites of historical importance within Weligama and its vicinity, including a 3 metres (9.8 ft) high bas-relief statue of Bodhisattva Avalokiteśvara, carved into the surrounding rock, between the 6th-9th century AD. It is known locally as Kusta Raja Gala or Rock of the Leper King and is thought to represent a king smitten with a skin disease (possibly leprosy "kusta"), who was prompted in a vision to take coconut pulp and water for three months as a cure. When he fulfilled the vision his health was restored, he then commissioned his figure to be carved on the rock commemorating this miraculous cure. This sculpture is believed to be all that is left of the old Agrabodhi Vihara that was located there.

Weligama is recognised for its beeralu bobbin lace-making. First introduced by the Portuguese in the 16th century, lace-making has remained a traditional handicraft along the coastal area of Weligama, with a number of households producing crochet and tatting lace.

The area is also famous for its distinct stilt fishermen, who erect a single pole in the chest-deep water on the beach, just few meters off-shore, where they perch on a cross bar and using bamboo fishing rods cast their lines out beyond the surf break to catch small fish.

== Gallery ==
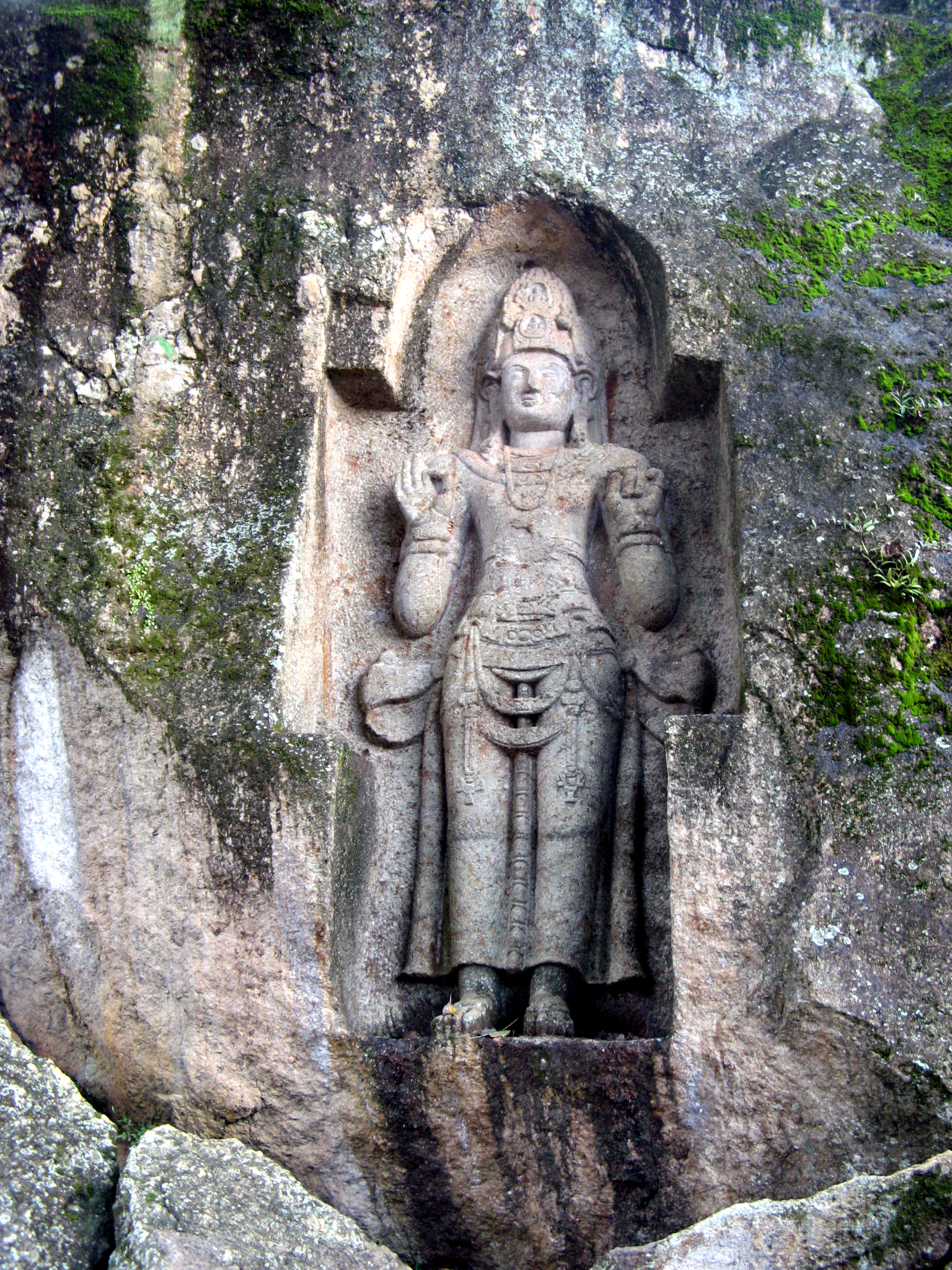
Avalokiteshvara

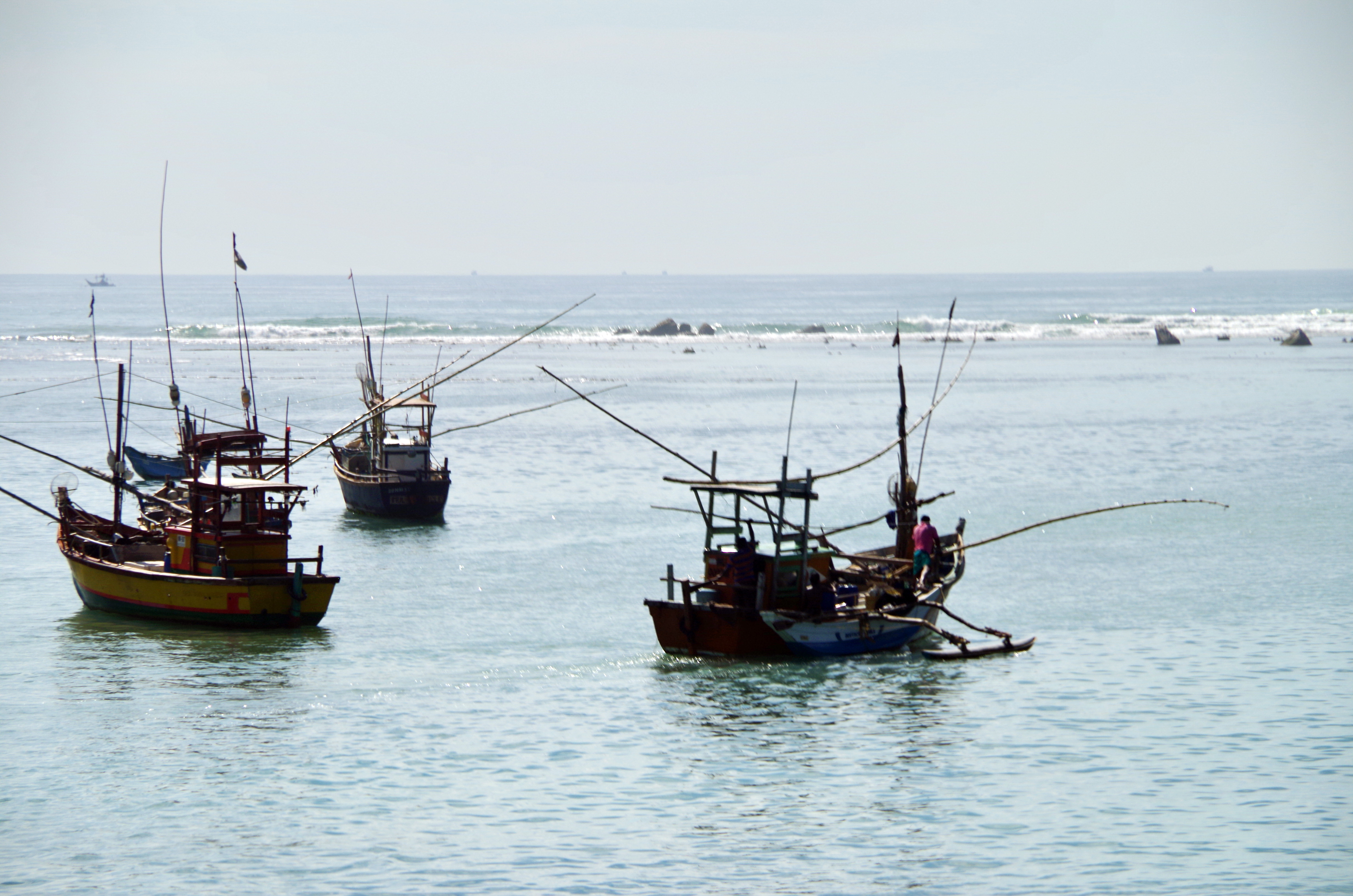
Fishing boats

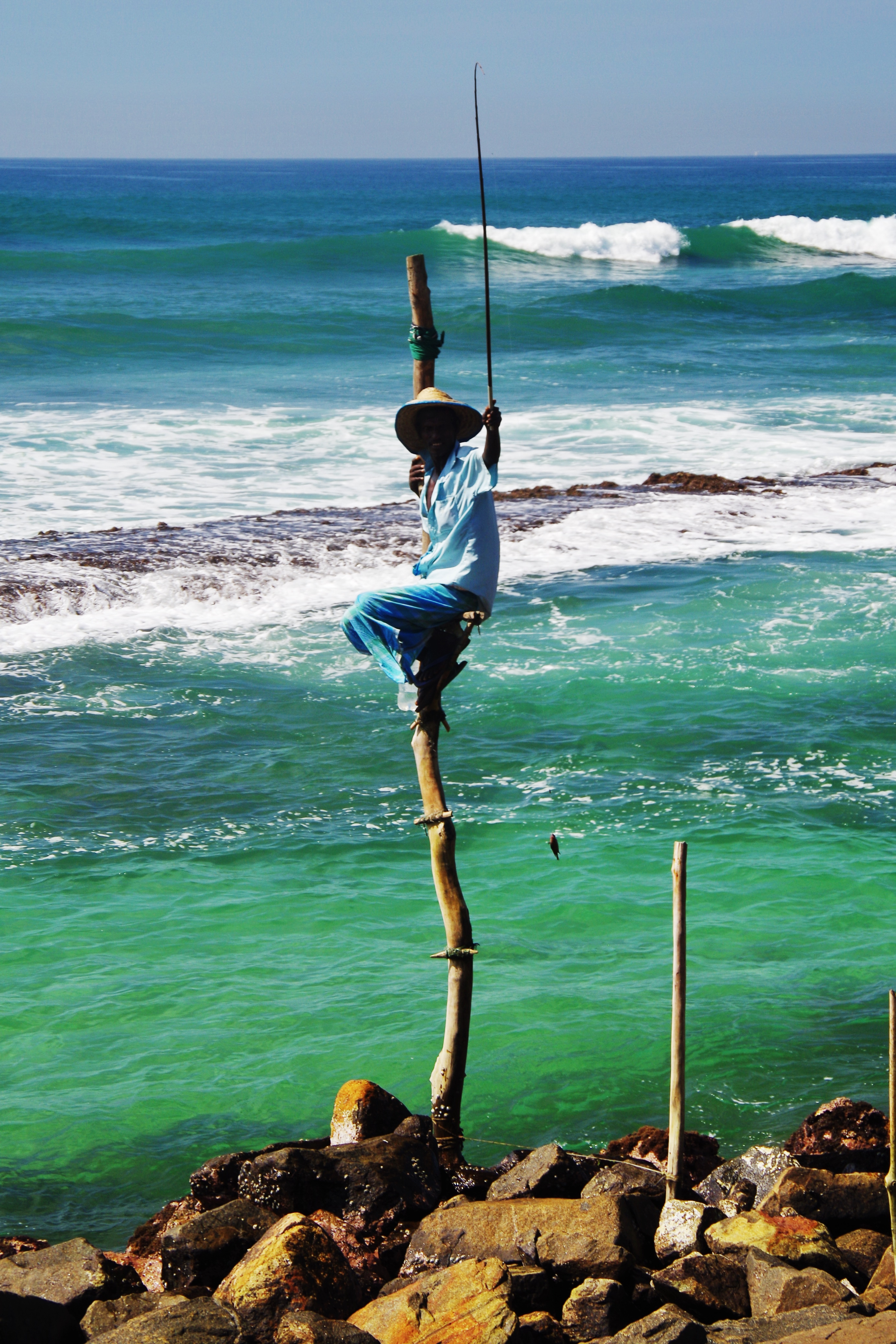
Stilt fisherman

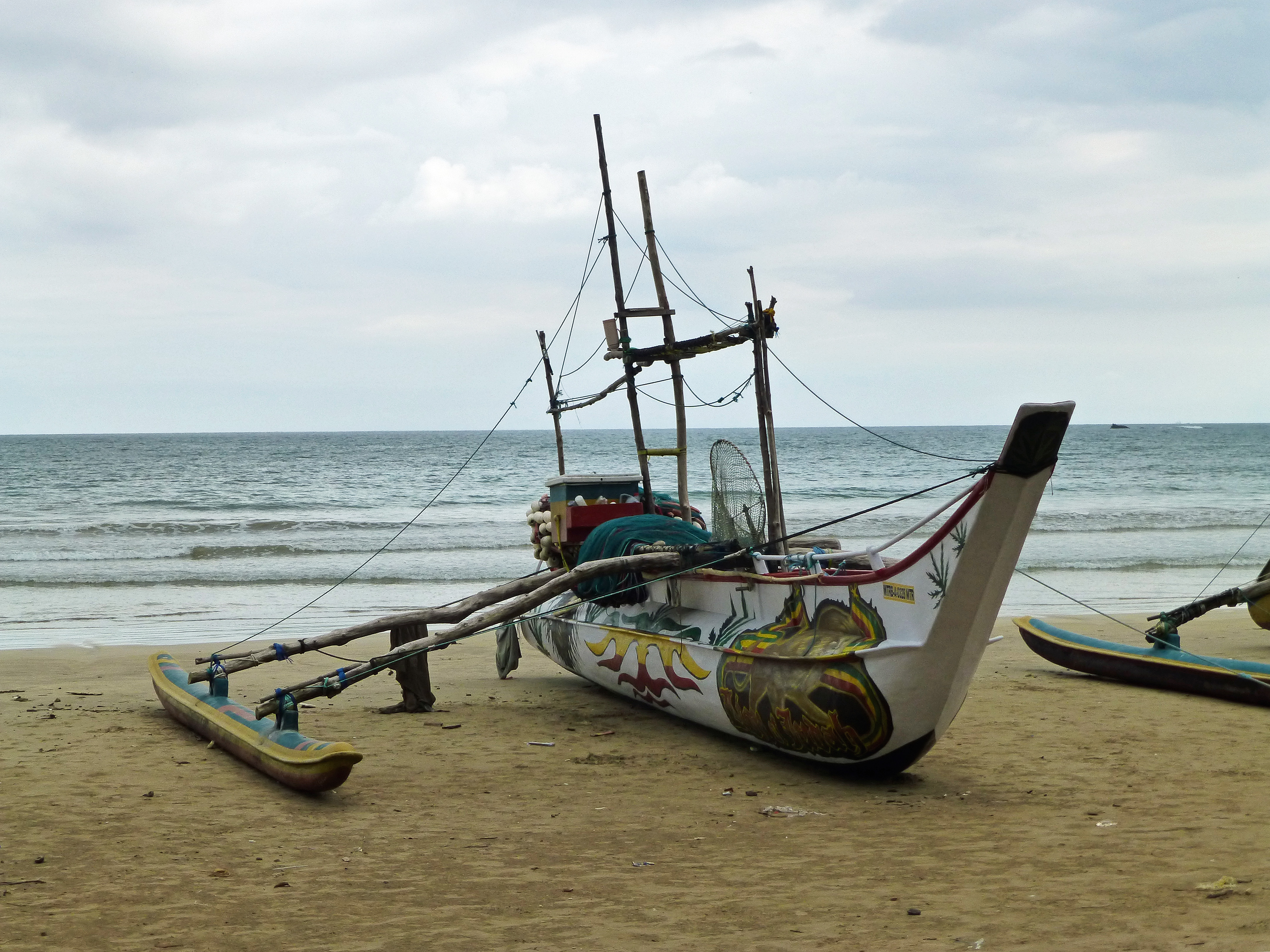
Outrigger fishing boat

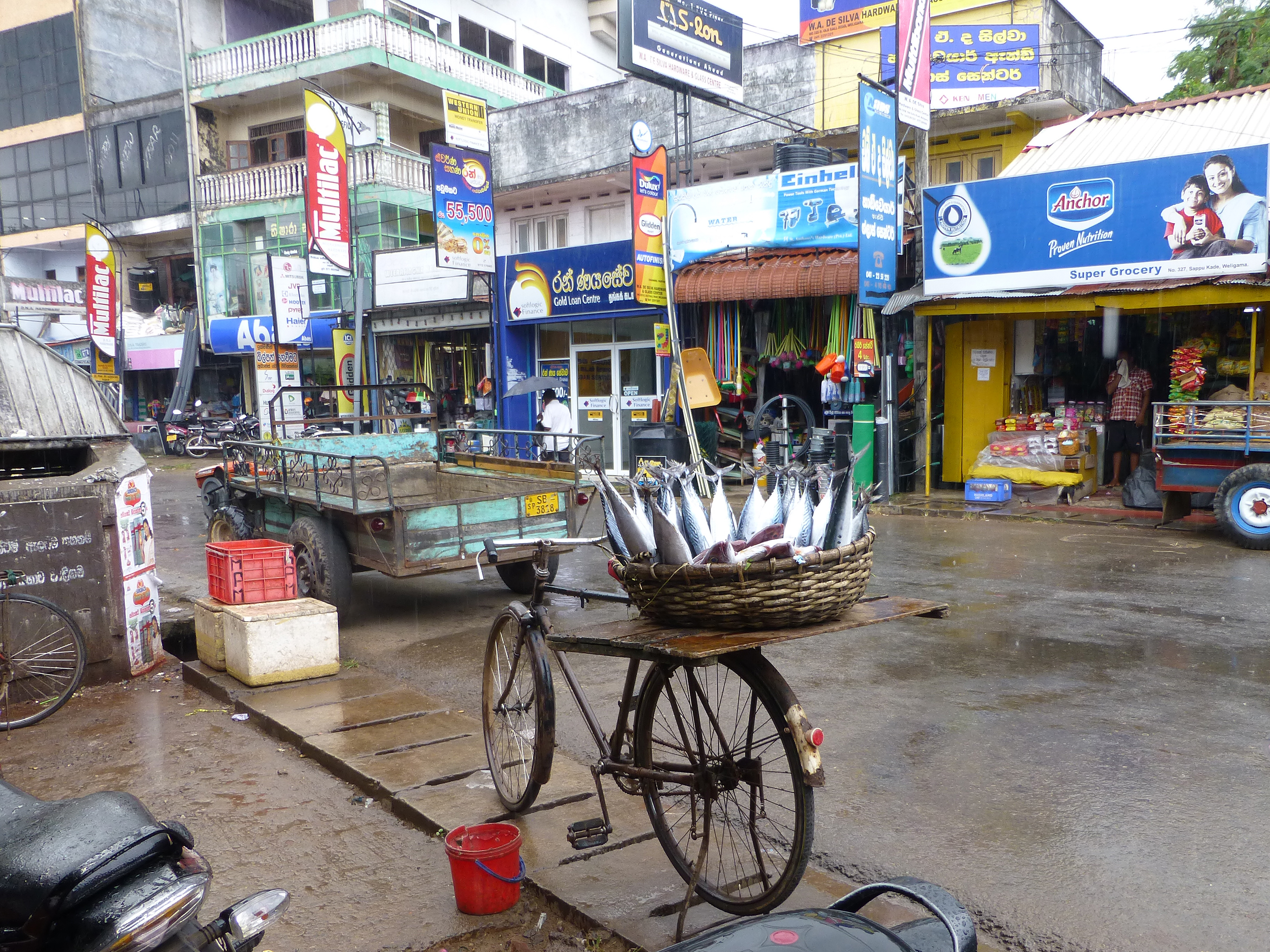
Street scene

== Transport ==
Weligama is located on the Coastal or Southern Rail Line (connecting Colombo through to Matara), and the A2 highway, connecting Colombo to Weligama.

== Demographics ==
The Weligama Urban Council area is Sinhalese Majority with a large Sri Lankan Muslim population, and a small number of Sri Lankan Tamils. Others including Indian Tamils, Burgher, Malay.

Ethnicity in Weligama Urban Council Area
Population	Percent
Sinhalese	75.54%
Sri Lankan Muslim	25.16%
Sri Lankan Tamils	0.22%
Others	0.5%

Source:Government Statistics.lk

Religious composition in Weligama DS Division according to 2012 census data is as follows Buddhists 65,046-89.30%, Muslims 7,379-10.13%, Hindus 158-0.22%, Roman Catholics 141-0.19%, Other Christians 115-0.16%, Others 4-0.01%.

== Facilities ==
- Weligama railway station
- Weligama post office

== Attractions ==
- Taprobane Island
- Stilt Fisherman
- Kusta Raja Gala
- Lace-making

== Post and telephone ==
- Sri Lanka 00 94
- Area code 041
- Postal code 81700

== See also ==
- List of towns in Southern Province, Sri Lanka
- List of beaches in Sri Lanka
