= Kalkudah =

Kalkudah கல்குடா කල්කුඪා
- Town
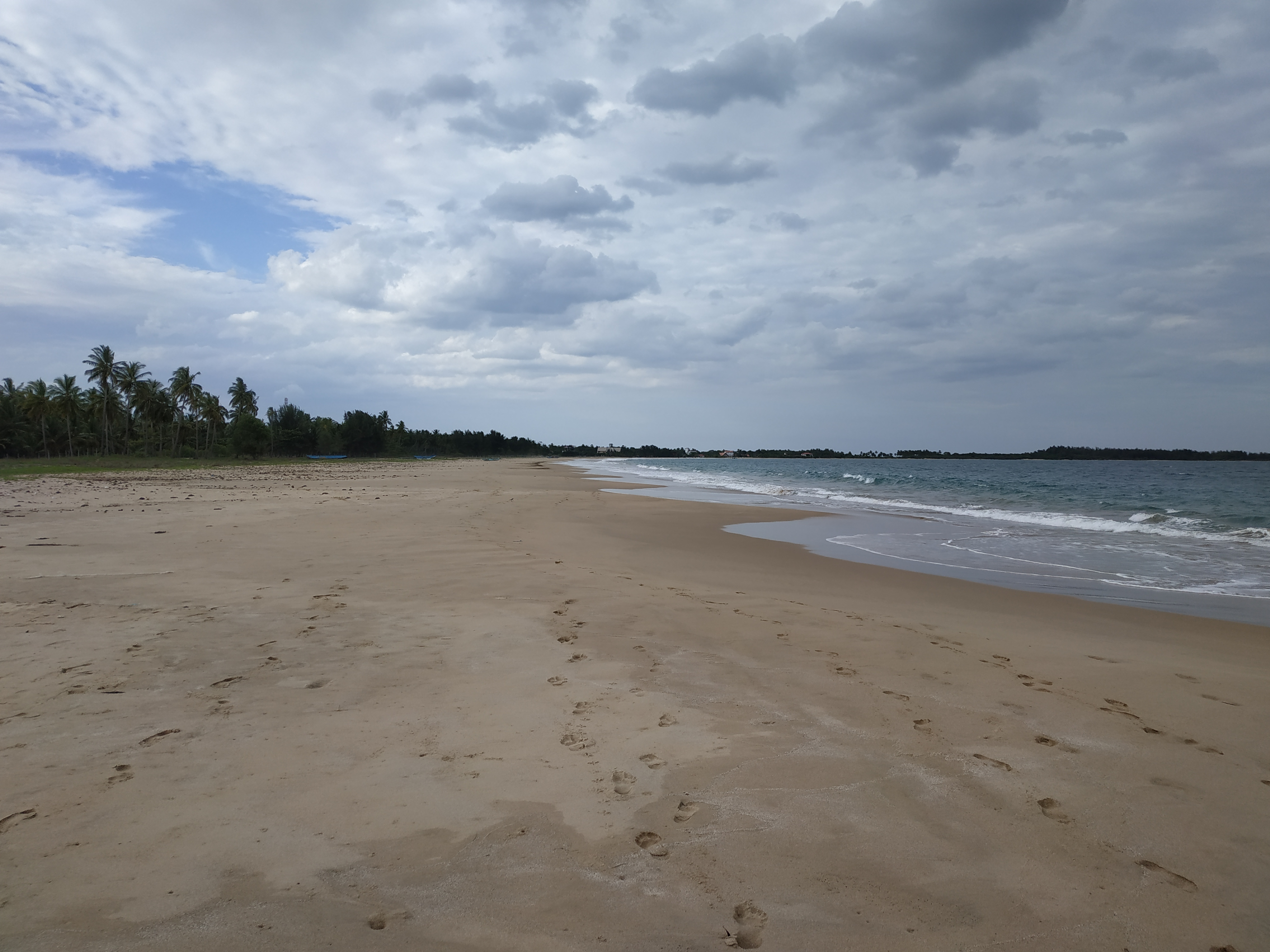
- Kalkudah Beach in August 2019

- Location within Sri Lanka
- Coordinates: 7°43′0″N 81°35′0″E
- Country: Sri Lanka
- Province: Eastern
- District: Batticaloa
- DS Division: Manmunai West

Kalkudah or Kalkuda (Pronounced Kal-Kuda, Tamil translation rock-bay) is a coastal resort town located about 35 kilometers northwest of Batticaloa, Batticaloa District, Sri Lanka. The 2004 Indian Ocean tsunami severely damaged Sri Lanka’s tourism sector, causing extensive damage to the tourist infrastructure and threatening tens of thousands of livelihoods. The subsequent civil conflict further depressed visitor numbers to coastal resorts on the east coast, including Kalkudah and Pasikudah. After the end of the war and reconstruction efforts, the region has seen renewed investment in the tourism infrastructure and a gradual return of tourists.

In recent time, Kalkudah receives plenty of visitors to Pasikudah beach.

== Twin cities ==
- Nuremberg, Bavaria, Germany

== See also ==
- Pasikudah
- Arugam Bay - Ampara District
- Nilaveli - Trincomalee District
