= Unawatuna =

Unawatuna උණවටුන
- Town
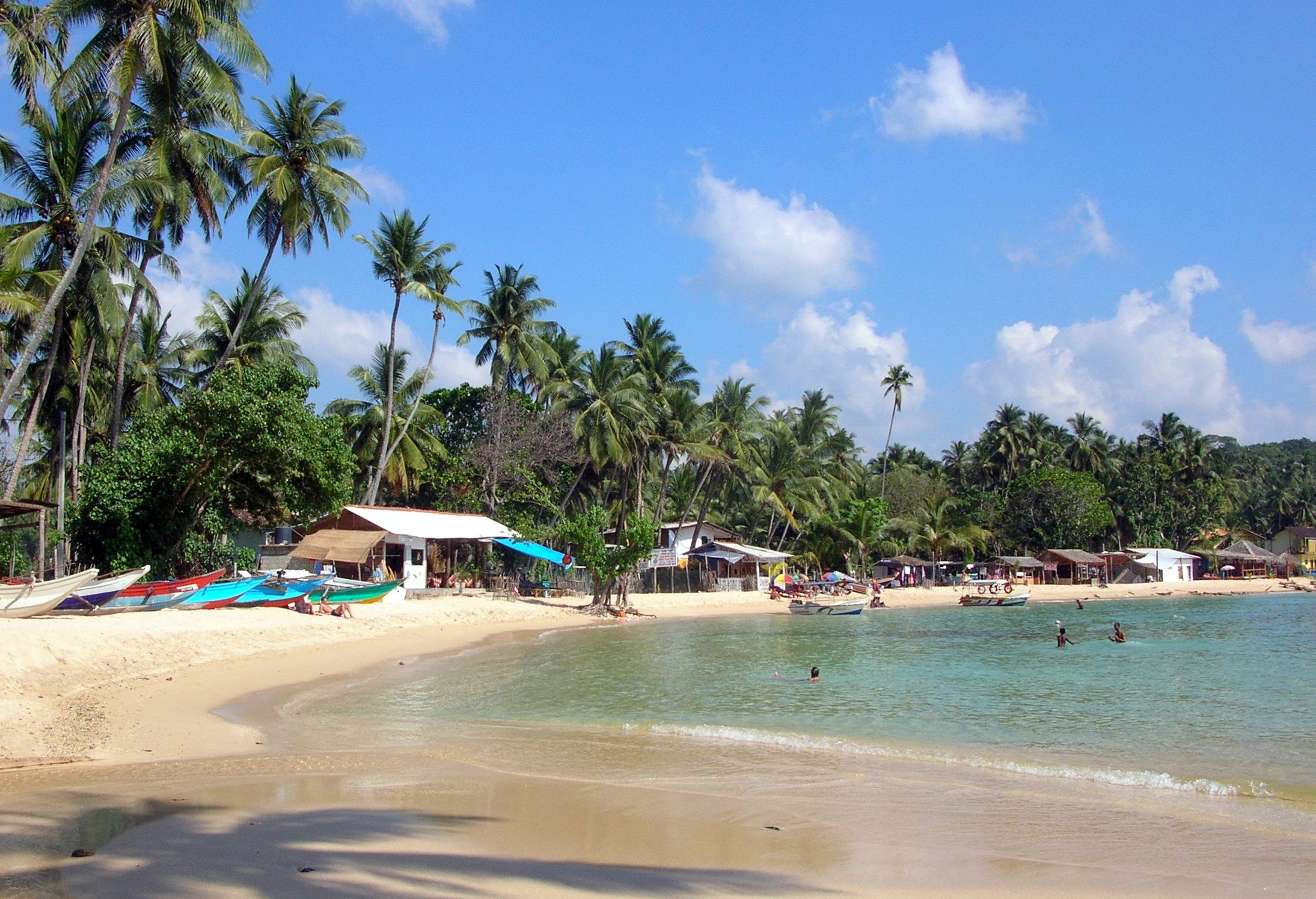
- Unawatuna Beach

- Location within Sri Lanka
- Coordinates: 6°01′6″N 80°15′9″E
- Country: Sri Lanka
- Province: Southern Province
- Time zone: UTC+5:30 (Sri Lanka Standard Time Zone)
  - Summer (DST): UTC+6 (Summer time)
- Post Code: 80600

Unawatuna is a coastal town in Galle district of Sri Lanka. Unawatuna is a major tourist attraction in Sri Lanka and known for its beach and corals. It is a suburb of Galle, about five kilometres (three miles) southeast of the city center and approximately 108 kilometres (67 mi) south of Colombo. Unawatuna is situated at an elevation of 5 metres (16 ft) above sea level. Despite significant development in the last decade it is still home to the endangered and endemic purple-faced langur, an unusually shy monkey species only found in Sri Lanka's forests.

== Mythical roots ==
=== From Ramayana ===
The description of the beach paradises in Valmiki's epic Ramayana sounds like Unawatuna.

"a seashore dotted with thousands of trees, coconuts, and palms dominating, strings of houses and hermitages along the coastline, human beings and superior beings such as Gandharvas, Siddhas, and ascetics, living in them and countless bejewelled celestial nymphs thronging the shore, the coast intermittently visited by heavenly beings, Gods and demons.":

Unawatuna traces its roots to the great epic Ramayana. In the epic, the monkey-warrior Hanuman was sent back to India to fetch the four medicinal herbs by Jambavan namely, mritasanjeevani, vishalyakarani, suvarnakarani, and sandhani from the Himalayas in order to heal Lakshman who was wounded trying to save the abducted Princess Sita from the demon king Ravana. Hanuman failed to identify these herbs, so he lifted the entire mountain and carried it to the battlefield to try to save Lakshman, but in the process, a chunk of it "fell-down" in the location of the present day Unawatuna, the name of the village derives from "Una-watuna" meaning "fell down".

Currently, an edifice is being built in honour of Hanuman on the harbour end of Rumassala Hill by Japanese monks of the Mahayana sect of Buddhism near the Peace Pagoda that they built.

=== Alternate mythology ===
A banished Indian prince was shipwrecked and the Goddess of Earth, Manimekalai, taking pity created a rocky shelf for him to save his life and that subsequently he headed to Unawatuna. The Goddess of Chastity, Pattini, created a wall of fire to prevent him coming ashore, but being a person of some supreme power, he set in motion a tsunami with his foot to extinguish the fire and set foot on the shores of Unawatuna.

It is said that he lived in Unawatuna and helped the people in various ways. Over the years he has been venerated and worshiped, and the Kovil (or Devalaya) on the west end point of the bay which has a history of over a thousand years is believed to be the abode of this Devol deity.

== Dagaba ==
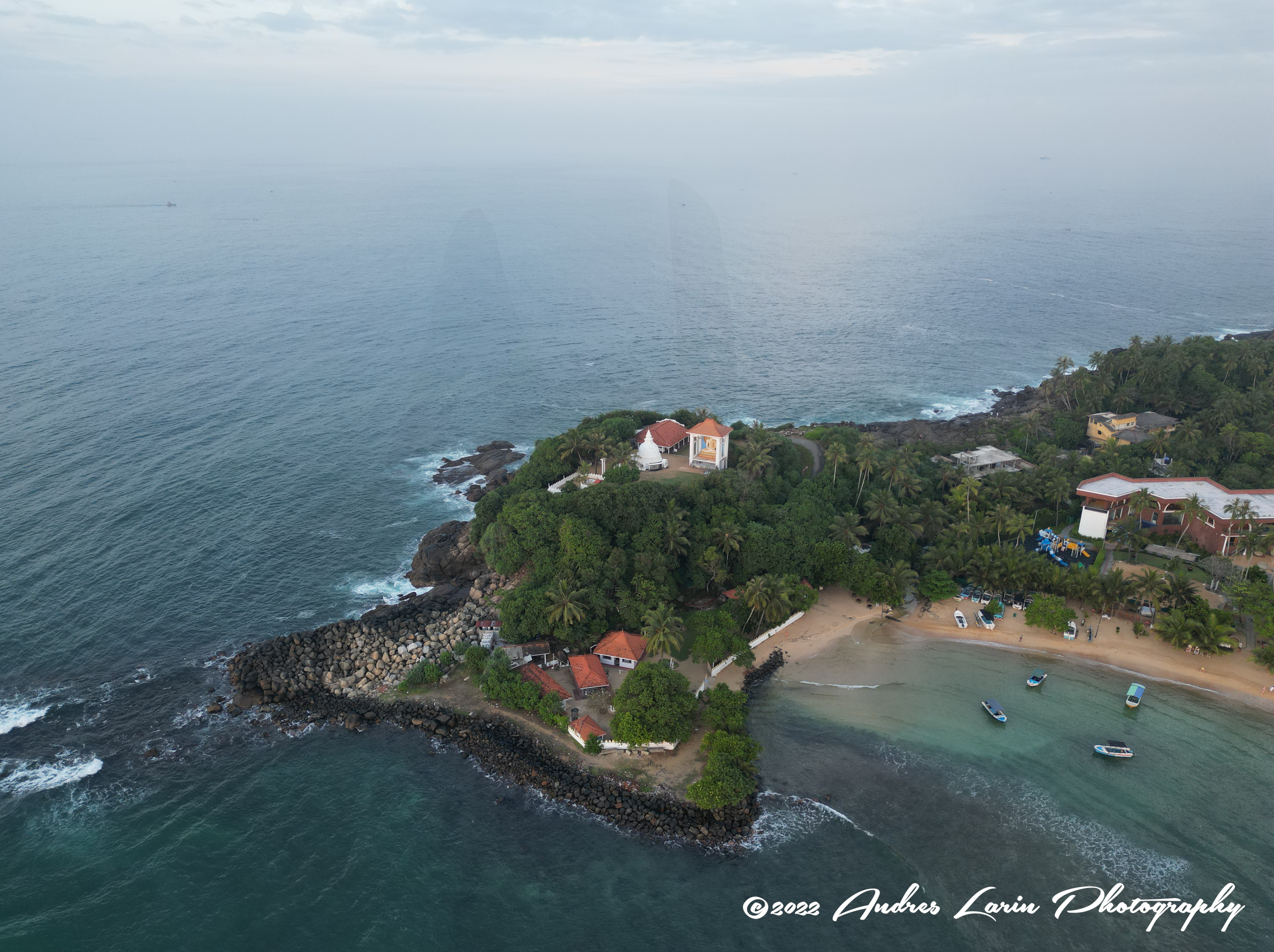
Dagoba in Unawatuna, Sri Lanka

In later years a Buduge, or House of Buddha, and the Suwethamali Chaitya, or Dagaba, was built on the hillock abutting the Dewalaya, or House of Gods. Thousands of pilgrims throng to this place of worship every month of Esala to offer pujas. This festival is a new rice offering so most cultivators bring a share of their crop and pray for timely rain and plentiful harvest. Some others save a fistful of rice from their daily meal and offer that rice, still others would purchase a few measures or even full gunnies of rice along with coconuts to offer.

This rice is pounded and mixed with coconut milk and treacle and made into a porridge which is then offered to the deities at the dewalaya and given as alms to thousands of devotees who will trek to the dewalaya for this alms giving or Maha Dewa Dana or Kiri Dana. Fisher folk save and offer part of their earnings called "Goda kotasa" seeking protection on their forays into the ocean.

== Colonial period ==
After defeating the Portuguese at the Fort of Negombo, the Dutch sailed south and landed on Unawatuna in 1640 and marched to Galle. The Portuguese had encountered the Dutch soldiers at Magalle (where the Closenberg Hotel is now located), and fierce fighting took place there. Over 400 Dutch soldiers were killed, and only 49 Portuguese could manage to get back to their fortification in Galle, where they were held in siege for four days before they surrendered.

The Dutch built houses for their officials in Unawatuna. These constructions include the Nooit Gedacht Hotel, Unawatuna Hospital and the mansion Maharambe. The UBR hotel is situated on a land called Parangiyawatta, meaning "land of the Portuguese", and the area nearby is known as Ja-kotuwa, suggesting that it was the settlement of Ja or Javanese people better known as Hollanders and there may have been some fortification.

The Galle tower or Edward's Pillar on Rumassala Hill is believed to have been a fake lighthouse built during World War I, and the area is shown as property of the British Admiralty in old survey maps.

== Tourism ==
Unawatuna is a popular tourist destination in Sri Lanka. 6 km (3.7 mi) away is Galle Fort, a UNESCO World Heritage Site.

== Eco-Tourism ==
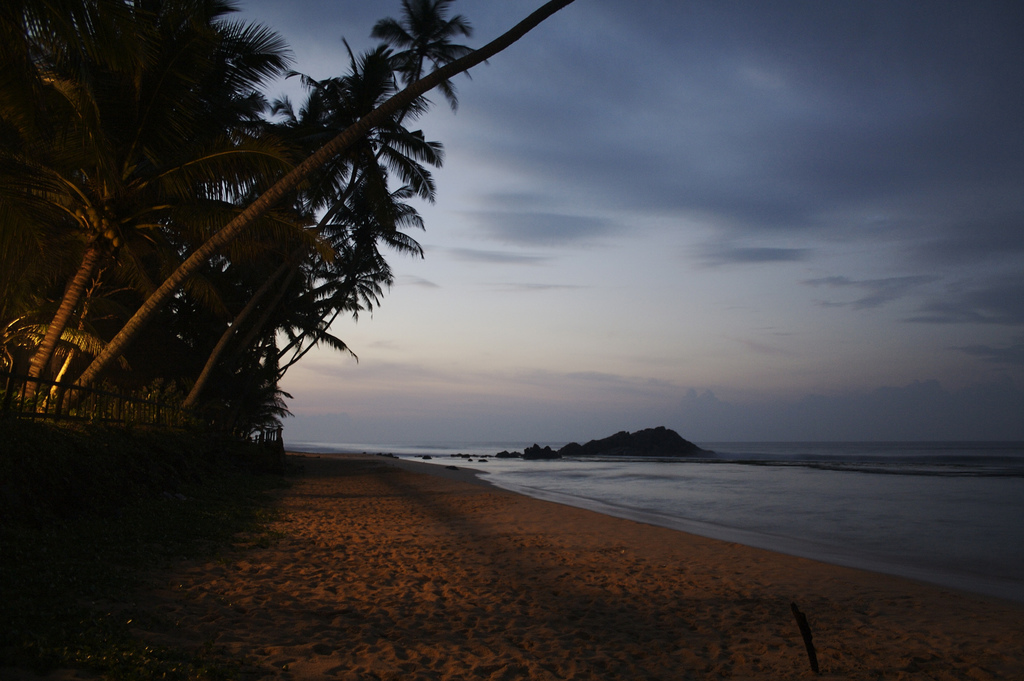
Mihiripenna Beach in Unawatuna at Dawn

Over sixty species of endemic birds, including terns, egrets, herons, sandpipers and kingfishers, as well as rarer species such as the lesser whistling duck, the Asian palm swift, the white-breasted waterhen, the Loten's sunbird and the black bittern have been sighted in the locality by the ornithologist, Clive Byers. These birds are mostly sighted in the remaining marshy area and Rumassala Hillock.

Off the coast of Unawatuna, beneath the Indian Ocean lies a number of coral reefs, shipwrecks, and a great variety of fish and turtles. The turtles still wade onto the shore to lay their nests and eggs, and at times, as if to lay first claim to the sandy shore, they may even wander right into the beach front restaurants .

The Rumassala coral reefs at the east end of the Galle harbour attract divers, but are now endangered due to possible port development. Eco treks in the shrub jungles of Rumassala are also available.

== Current status ==
The 2004 Indian Ocean tsunami swept away many beach front restaurants and has devastated the sandy beach to a great extent, marring what was once claimed to be one of the twelve best beaches in the world. It is still considered to be one of the best 100 beaches of the world.

Beginning on December 14, 2011, many illegal structures were cleared from the beachfront.

== Transport ==
Unawatuna is located on the Coastal or Southern Rail Line (connecting Colombo through to Matara), and the A2 highway, connecting Colombo to Wellawaya.

== Facilities ==
- Unawatuna railway station
- Unawatuna Post Office
- Unawatuna Hospital
- Unawatuna Maha Vidyalaya
- Buona Vista College

== Attractions ==
- Unawatuna Beach and coral reefs
- Unawatuna Peace Pagoda
- Yatagala Raja Maha Viharaya Buddhist Temple
- Turtle hatcheries (Habaraduwa)

== See also ==
- List of beaches in Sri Lanka
- Hikkaduwa
