= Effect of the 2004 Indian Ocean earthquake on Sri Lanka =

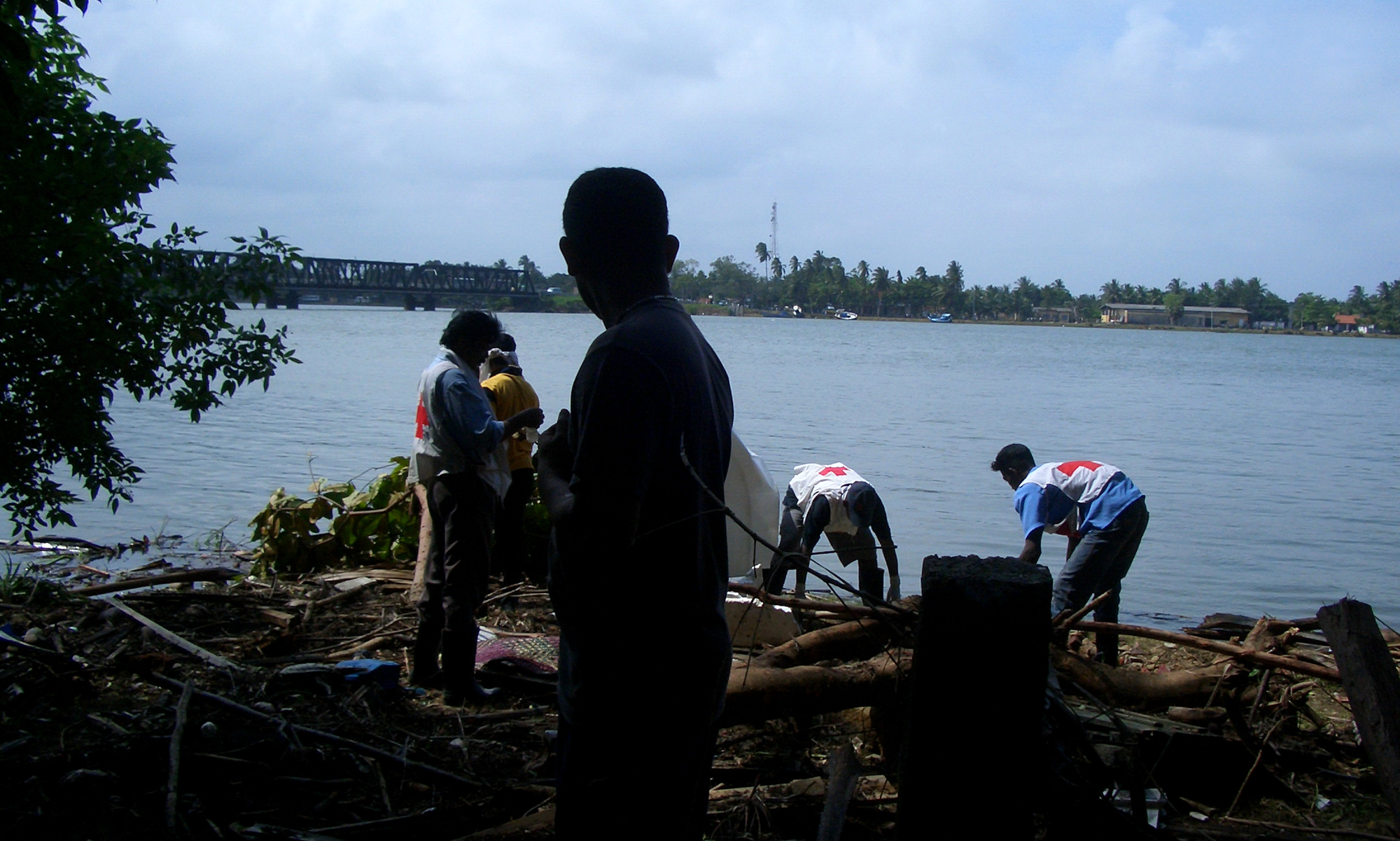
- Red Cross volunteers remove corpse from the shore
- UTC time: 2004-12-26 00:58:54
- ISC event: 7453151
- USGS-ANSS: ComCat
- Local date: 26 December 2004
- Magnitude: 9.1–9.3
- Depth: 30
- Epicenter: Indian Ocean, off the coast of Sumatra
- Casualties: 31,229 confirmed dead, 4,093 missing, 21,411 injured

The Sri Lanka 2004 disaster was one of the cataclysmic events that took place in the Indian sub-continent countries struck by a tsunami resulting from the Indian Ocean earthquake on 26 December 2004. On 3 January 2005, Sri Lankan emergency authorities had reported 30,000+ confirmed deaths. Following the event, one and a half million people were displaced from their homes.

Additionally, further death toll continued to rise as the threat of infectious diseases broke out soon after with confirmed first cases of cholera following the disaster.

== Tsunami and immediate effects ==
The train which was struck by the tsunami.

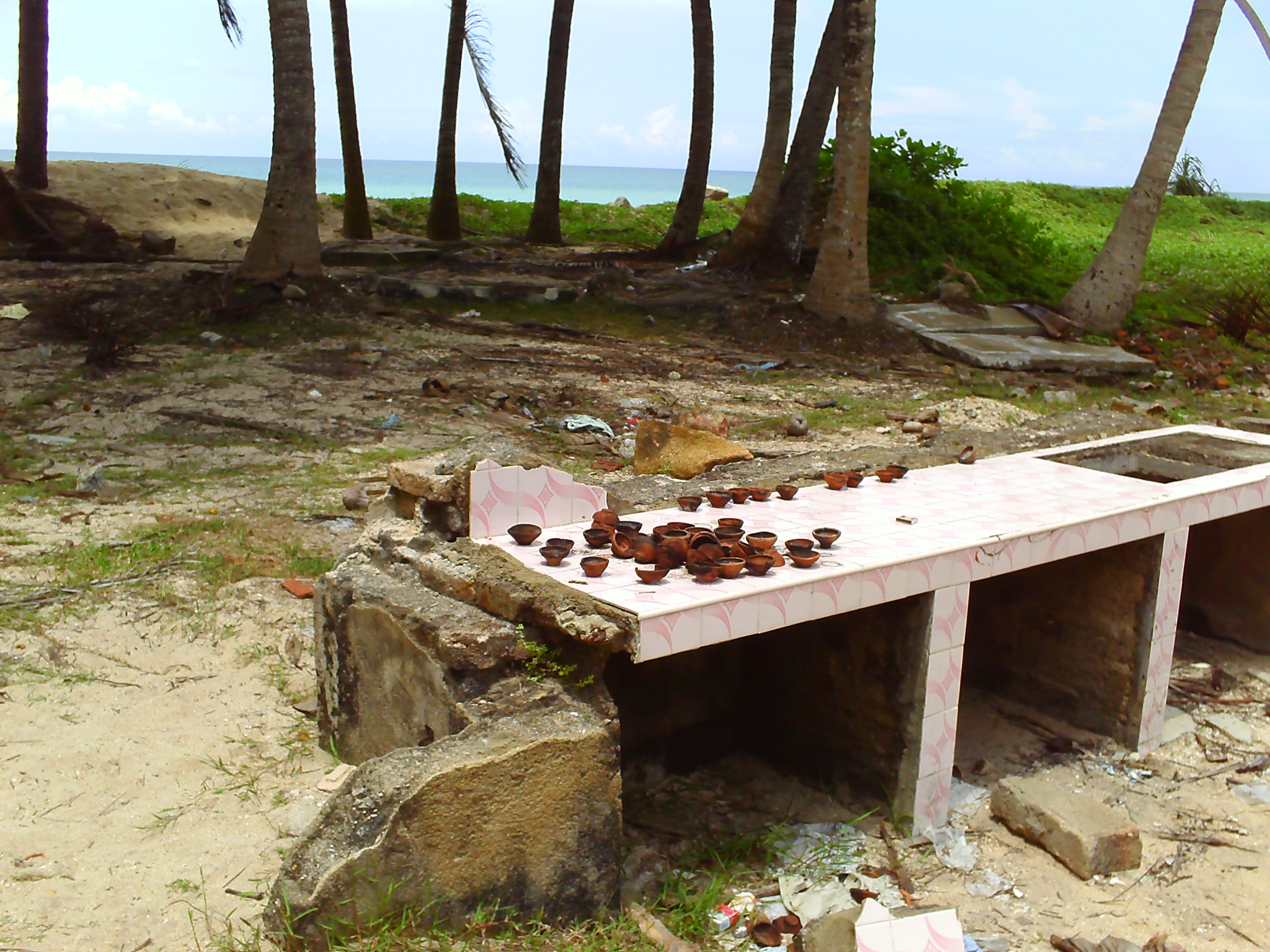
Remains of a house near Telwatte, photographed in March 2008.

In Ampara District alone, more than 10,000 people died. A holiday train, the "Queen of the Sea", was struck by the tsunami near the village of Telwatta as it travelled between Colombo and Galle carrying at least 1,700 passengers, killing all but a handful on board. About 8,000 more dead were counted in the northeast region, which was controlled by the Liberation Tigers of Tamil Eelam (LTTE or Tamil Tigers). At Trincomalee in the northeast, where the tsunami reached more than 2 km (1.25 mi) inland, over 1,000 were confirmed dead. More than 3,000 dead were reported at Batticaloa in the east. The naval base at Trincomalee was reported to be submerged.

The agricultural sector was affected seriously. 259 km^{2} of paddy land was destroyed in the northern, eastern, southern and western coastal belts. In addition, the extensive salinization of paddy lands rendered them unsuitable for paddy cultivation. Rubbish was also deposited on paddy lands. A large number of agricultural vehicles and equipment were destroyed, and canals and drains were blocked. Underground sources of water were salinated.

Across the island, collections were taken for those who had lost everything. Vans with PA systems drove around calling on people to give whatever they could – money, clothes, bottles of water and bags of rice and lentils.

Apart from homes, many hotels as well as shops were reported to have been damaged. Hotels along the south coast were full of both foreign tourists and Sri Lankans. Twenty thousand soldiers were deployed in government-controlled areas to assist in relief operations and maintain law and order after sporadic looting. Curfews had been imposed in some areas to curb looting. Chinese light T-72A anti-personnel mines, left after the two-decade civil war, were feared to have been washed up and spread by the surge of water. The Norwegian Peoples' Aid Organization assembled a team of mine sweepers to assess the situation.

== Aftermath and governmental response ==
The main coastal highway in the south of Sri Lanka was closed in the aftermath of the tsunami, delaying relief supplies. An initial effort to deliver supplies was made by large numbers of private individuals filling their own vans and pickup trucks with food, clothing and bottled water and driving to affected areas.

Reports of measles and diarrhoea reached authorities, renewing fears of a deadly epidemic. Relief operations were based in Colombo.

On the morning of 30 December 2004, the Indian government warned of another possible tsunami, to make sure that the people would know what to do. However, The false alarm caused general panic in relief camps and incited traffic jams on roads leading from the coast.

The science fiction author and scuba diver Arthur C Clarke, who lived in Colombo, the capital, issued a statement saying that Sri Lanka "lacks the resources and capacity to cope with the aftermath". Clarke reported that his family and staff were safe, "even though some are badly shaken and relate harrowing first hand accounts of what happened", and that his diving school (Arthur C. Clarke Diving School) "Underwater Safaris" at Hikkaduwa were destroyed.

Sri Lanka's most popular sport is cricket, and the Australian, Bangladeshi, English and South African cricket teams announced that they would donate to the humanitarian effort in Sri Lanka and other Asian countries. The Indian cricket team pledged funds to the humanitarian effort in southern India. Two one-day matches were scheduled to raise further funds.

=== International assistance ===
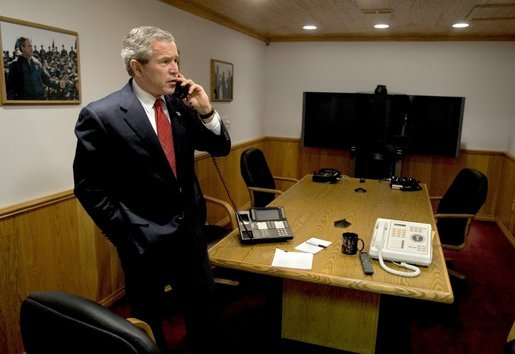
U.S. President George W. Bush (in Crawford, Texas) speaks by phone to Sri Lankan President Chandrika Kumaratunga, 29 December 2004

An Indian Navy medical team arrived in Colombo within hours of the tsunami. Eventually India deployed 14 ships, nearly 1,000 military personnel and several dozen helicopters and airplanes to Sri Lanka.

A three-ship fleet carrying 2,000 U.S. Marines out of Diego Garcia was sent to Sri Lanka. The Marines were bound for Iraq to assist in the January elections, but the fleet included a dozen heavy-lift helicopters and surgical hospitals, both badly needed in Sri Lanka.

On 6 January 2005, 150 members of the Canadian Disaster Assistance Response Team (DART), a Canadian Forces group, arrived in Sri Lanka. The team brought four water purification units and provided medical, engineering and communication services. Another 50 members of the team arrived on 8 January to help the people.

Relief efforts were impeded by heavy monsoon rain which washed-out roads and caused freshwater flooding. In most of India the winter northeast monsoon is relatively dry, but in Sri Lanka and Tamil Nadu it blows from Burma across the Bay of Bengal picking up water from the sea.
