= Pasikudah =

Pasikudah பாசிக்குடா පාසිකුඩා
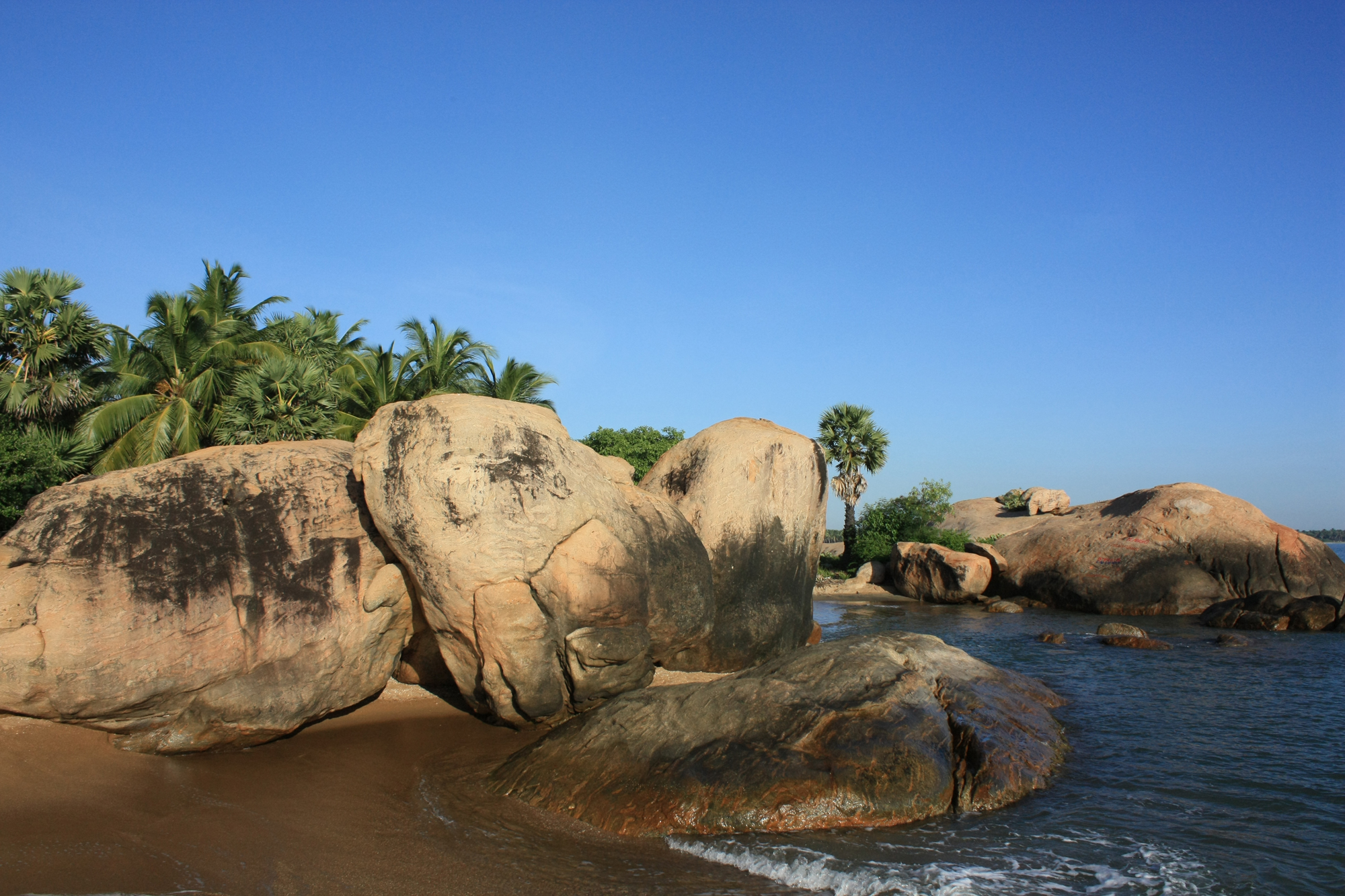

- Location within Sri Lanka
- Coordinates: 7°55′42″N 81°33′42″E
- Country: Sri Lanka
- Province: Eastern Province
- District: Batticaloa
- Divisional Secreatariat: Manmunai West

Pasikudah or Pasikuda (Tamil: பாசிக்குடா; Sinhala: පාසිකුඩා; (Pronounced Paasikkudah - historic Tamil translation "Green-Algae-Bay") is a coastal resort town located 35 kilometers northwest of Batticaloa, Batticaloa District, Sri Lanka. Historically a small Tamil hamlet alongside nearby Kalkudah, it used to be a popular tourist destination. However, it suffered huge devastation following the 2004 Indian Ocean tsunami and the Sri Lankan civil war. Foreign travel to Pasikudah has recently increased due to growth in investment and development. It is home to the Pasikudah Mariamman temple. Pasikudah is easily accessible from the cities of Trincomalee and Batticaloa. The nearest airport is Batticaloa Airport, which has scheduled flights operating from Colombo Bandaranaike International Airport.

== Landscape and development ==
Since the end of the civil war in 2009 and the completion of tsunami rehabilitation projects, Pasikudah has become a popular tourist destination. Foreign and local investors have shown interest in developing tourism along the beach. The Sri Lankan government's strict environmental policies have prevented certain plans for mass development, although economic policies have promoted development to a certain extent. Pasikudah is known to have one of the longest stretches of shallow reef coastline in the world. People walk kilometers into the sea because the water is only a few inches deep and the current is relatively weak compared to the rest of Sri Lanka's coasts.

== Gallery ==
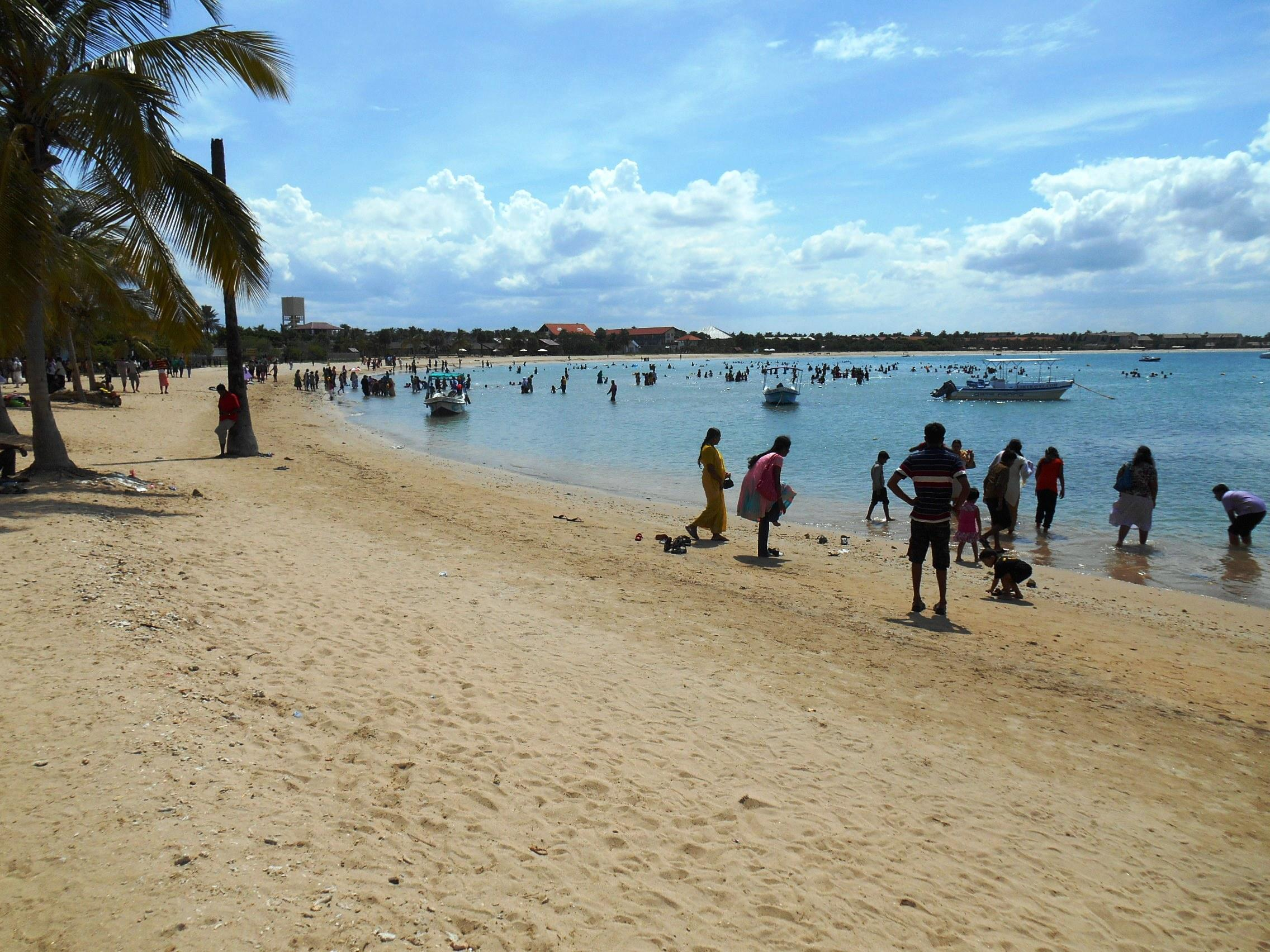
Pasikudah beach

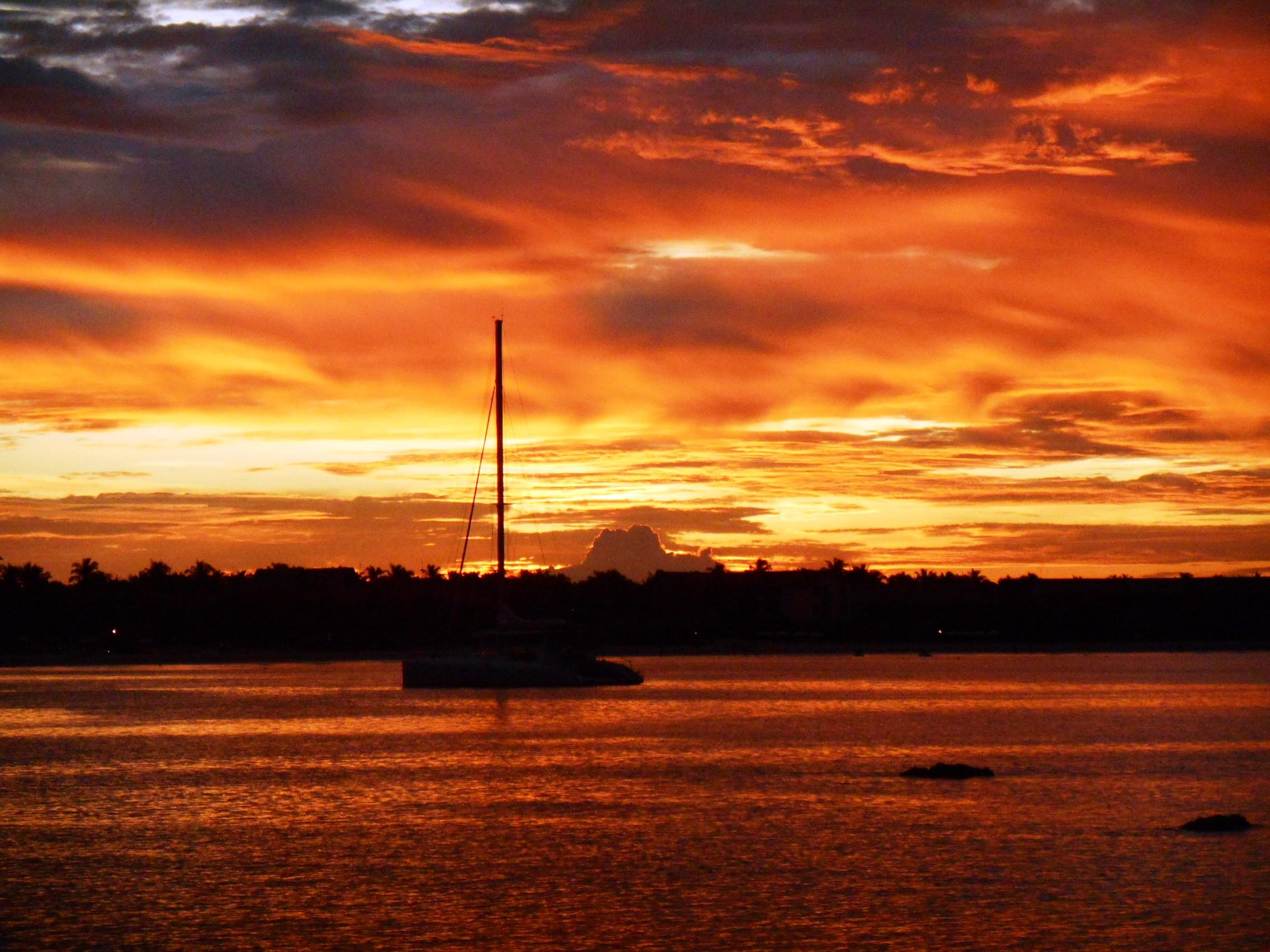
Sunset at Pasikudah beach

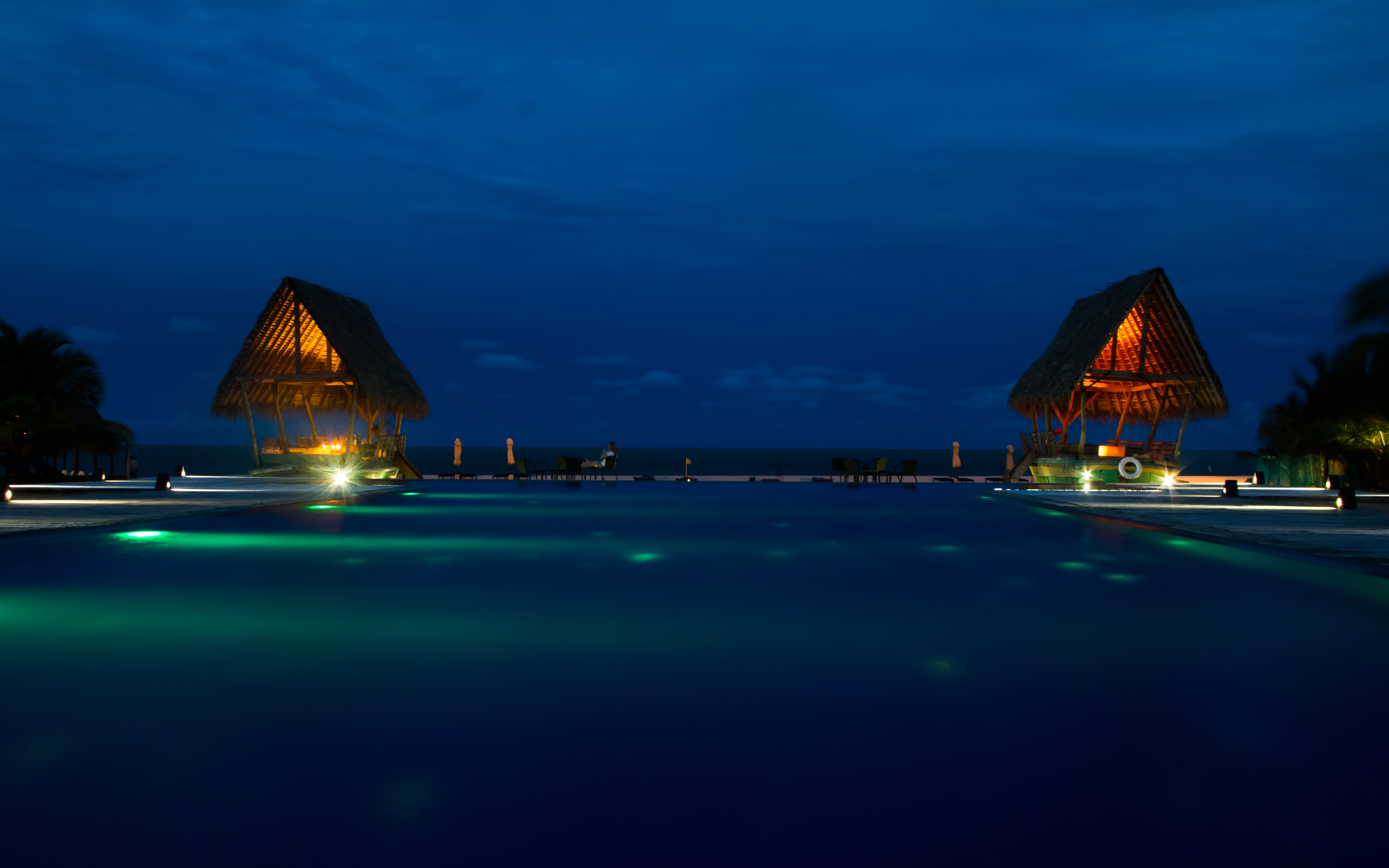
Maalu Maalu Beach Resort, Pasikuda, Sri Lanka

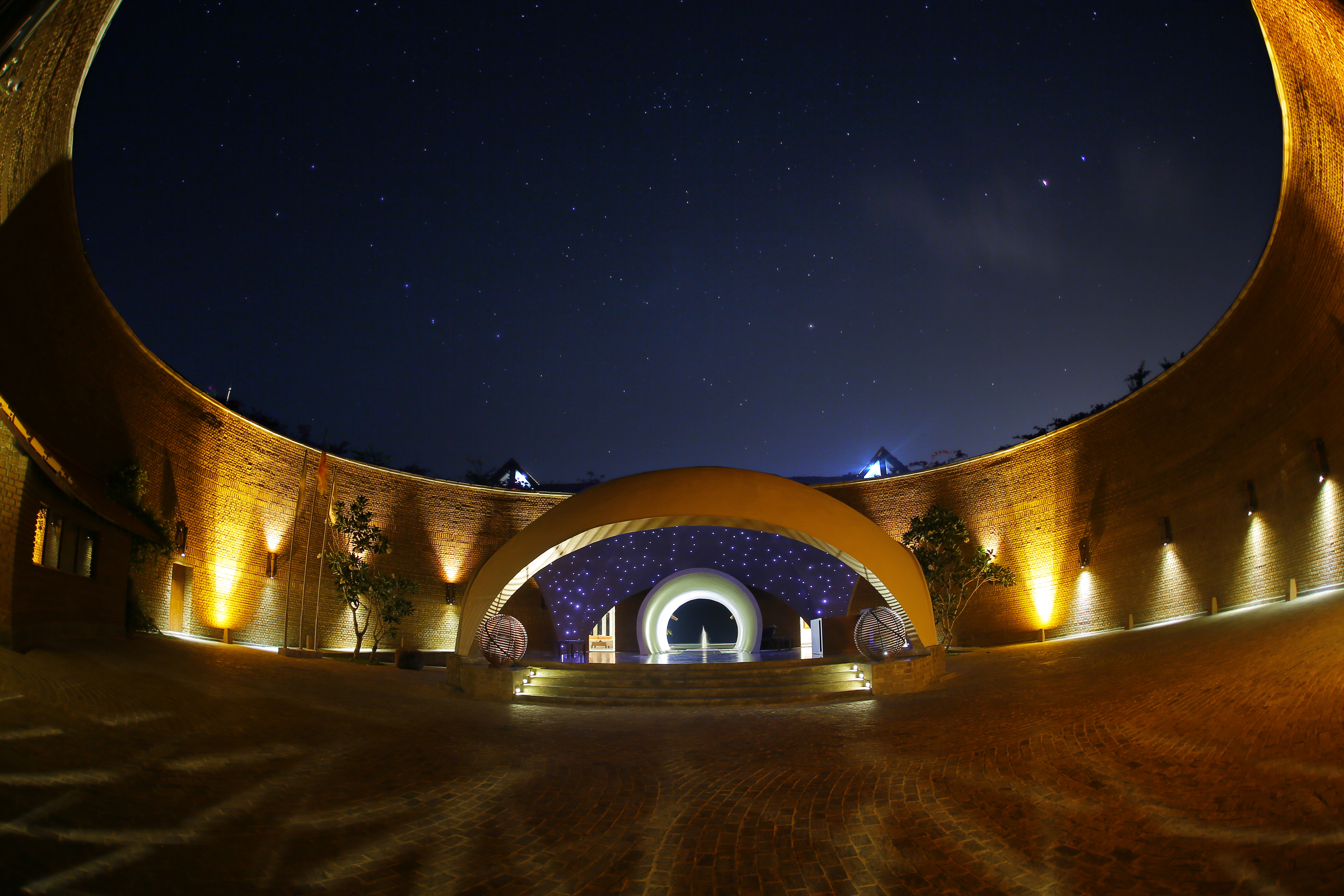
Uga Bay Hotel Kalkudah, Pasikuda

== See also ==
- Kalkudah
- Arugam Bay – Ampara District
- Nilaveli – Trincomalee District
