= Hikkaduwa Divisional Secretariat =

- Divisional Secretariat
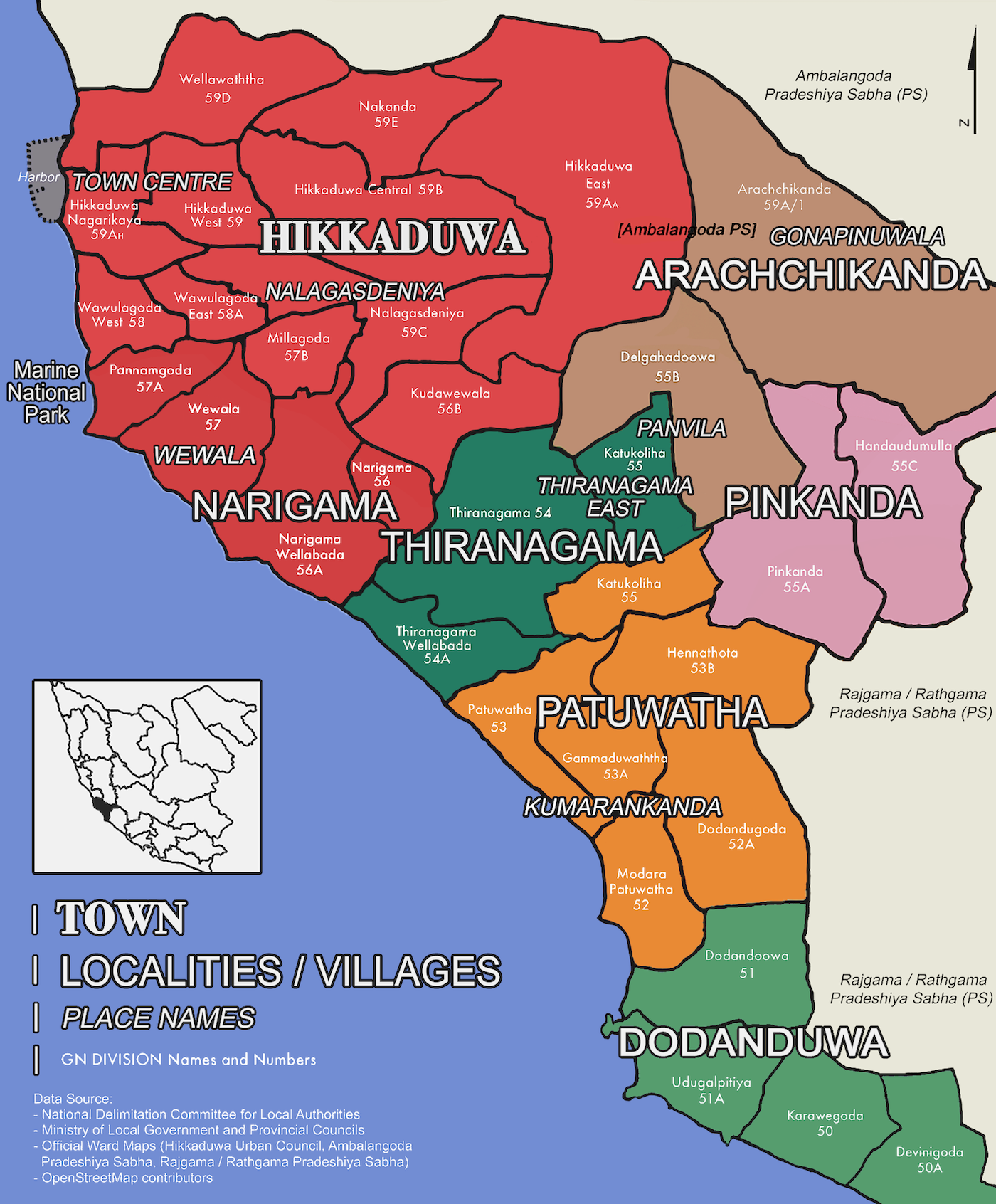
- Administrative map of Hikkaduwa region
- Coordinates: 6°08′20″N 80°06′05″E
- Country: Sri Lanka
- Province: Southern Province
- District: Galle District
- DS Division: Hikkaduwa

Government
  - Type: Divisional Secretariat

Area
  - Total: 65 km^{2} (25 sq mi)
  - Land: 65 km^{2} (25 sq mi)
- Elevation: 6 m (20 ft)

Population (2012)
  - Total: 101,909
  - Density: 1,600/km^{2} (4,100/sq mi)
- Time zone: UTC+5:30 (Sri Lanka Standard Time)
- Postal code: 80240
- Area code: +94 91
- GN Divisions: 97
- Website: ds.gov.lk

Hikkaduwa Divisional Secretariat is a Divisional Secretariat of Galle District, in Southern Province. Its total area is approximately 65 km², stretching along a 24 km coastal zone, and extending 4 to 4.8 km inland.

== Location ==
Located about 12 kilometers from Galle on the route to Colombo, the Hikkaduwa Divisional Secretariat is bounded to the west by the Indian Ocean.

== Total Area ==
The borders of the Hikkaduwa Divisional Secretariat are defined by :

- a 24 km coastal stretch
- extending inland between 4 km in the north
- and 4.8 km inland in the south.

Covering a total land area of 6,511 hectares (65 km²), it represents approximately 4% of the Galle District's territory.

== Boundaries ==
Its boundaries are marked by the Ambalangoda Divisional Secretariat to the north and east, while the Baddegama and Gonapinuwala divisions lie to the southeast. It is further bordered by the Galle Four Gravets division and the Indian Ocean. Geographically, the jurisdiction spans from the Gintota Bridge to the Orawatta Bridge.

It lies between northern latitudes 6°03' to 6°14' and eastern longitudes 80°03' to 80°10'.

== Administrative units ==
The Hikkaduwa Divisional Secretariat comprises :

- 97 Grama Niladhari (GN) divisions
- and is one of the 19 administrative divisions within the Galle District in the Southern Province, Sri Lanka.

== Places ==
Places in Hikkaduwa Divisional Secretariat:

- Hikkaduwa
- Hikkaduwa Marine National Park
- Narigama
- Narigama Beach
- Thiranagama
- Dodanduwa
- Thiranagama Beach
- Wewala
- Peraliya, Hikkaduwa, (Site of the largest rail disaster in history)
- Hikkaduwa Tsunami Memorial Statue (Tsunami Honganji Viharaya)
- Patuwatha
- Katukoliha

== Demography ==
According to the Census of Population and Housing in 2012, the population was 101,909.

== Religions ==
Religion in Hikkaduwa DS Division (2012)
1. Buddhist (99.1%)
2. Hindu (0.30%)
3. Muslim (0.10%)
4. Roman Catholic (0.30%)
5. Other Christian (0.30%)
6. Other (0.00%)

== See also ==
- Hikkaduwa Urban Council
- Hikkaduwa
- Hikkaduwa National Park
- Wewala
- Narigama
- Thiranagama
- Dodanduwa
- Hikkaduwa Tsunami Honganji Viharaya
- The World's Largest Rail Disaster
- Patuwatha
