= Kumarakanda =

Kumarakanda කුමාරකන්ද
- Village
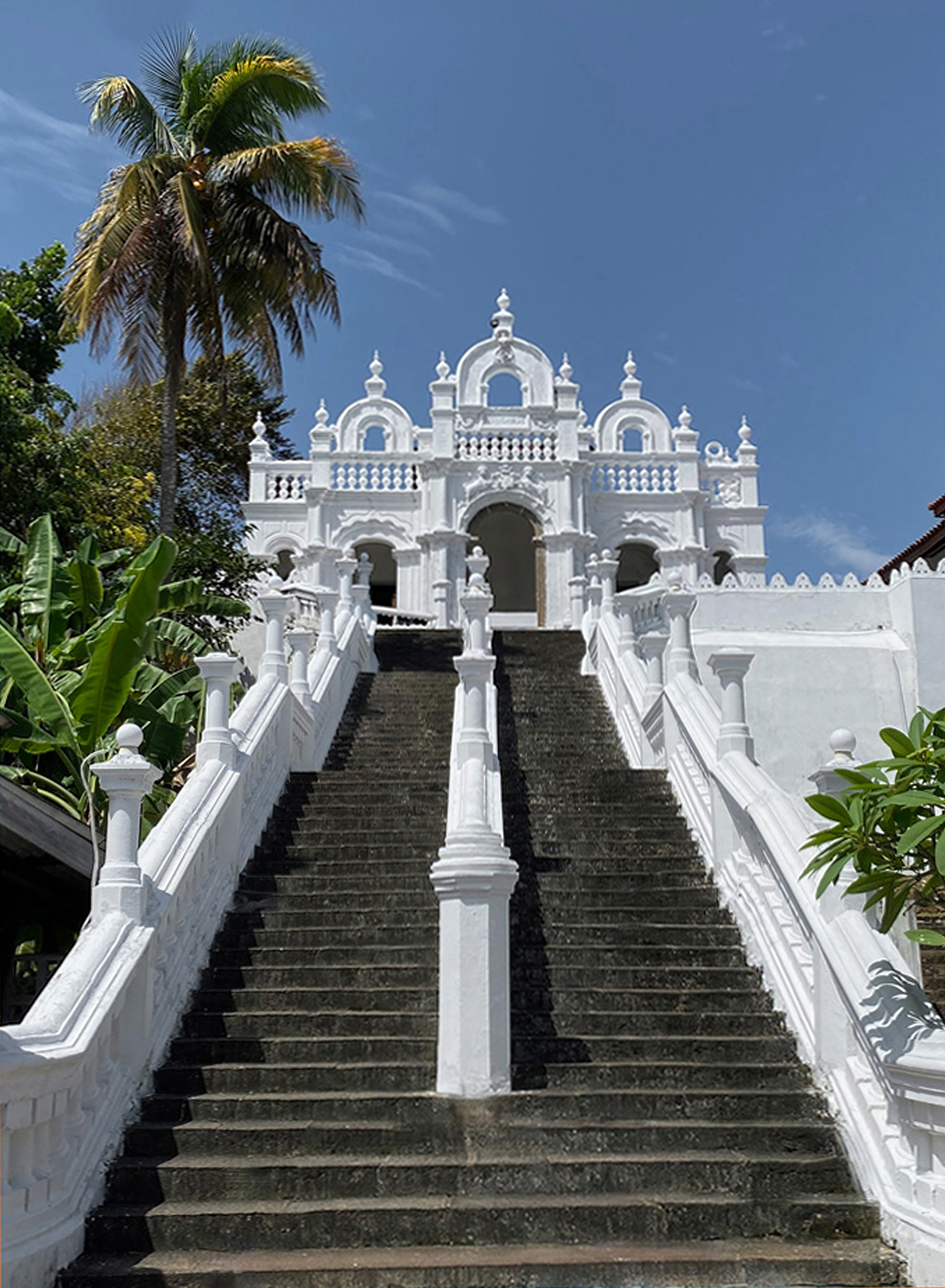
- Kumarakanda Temple, Hikkaduwa

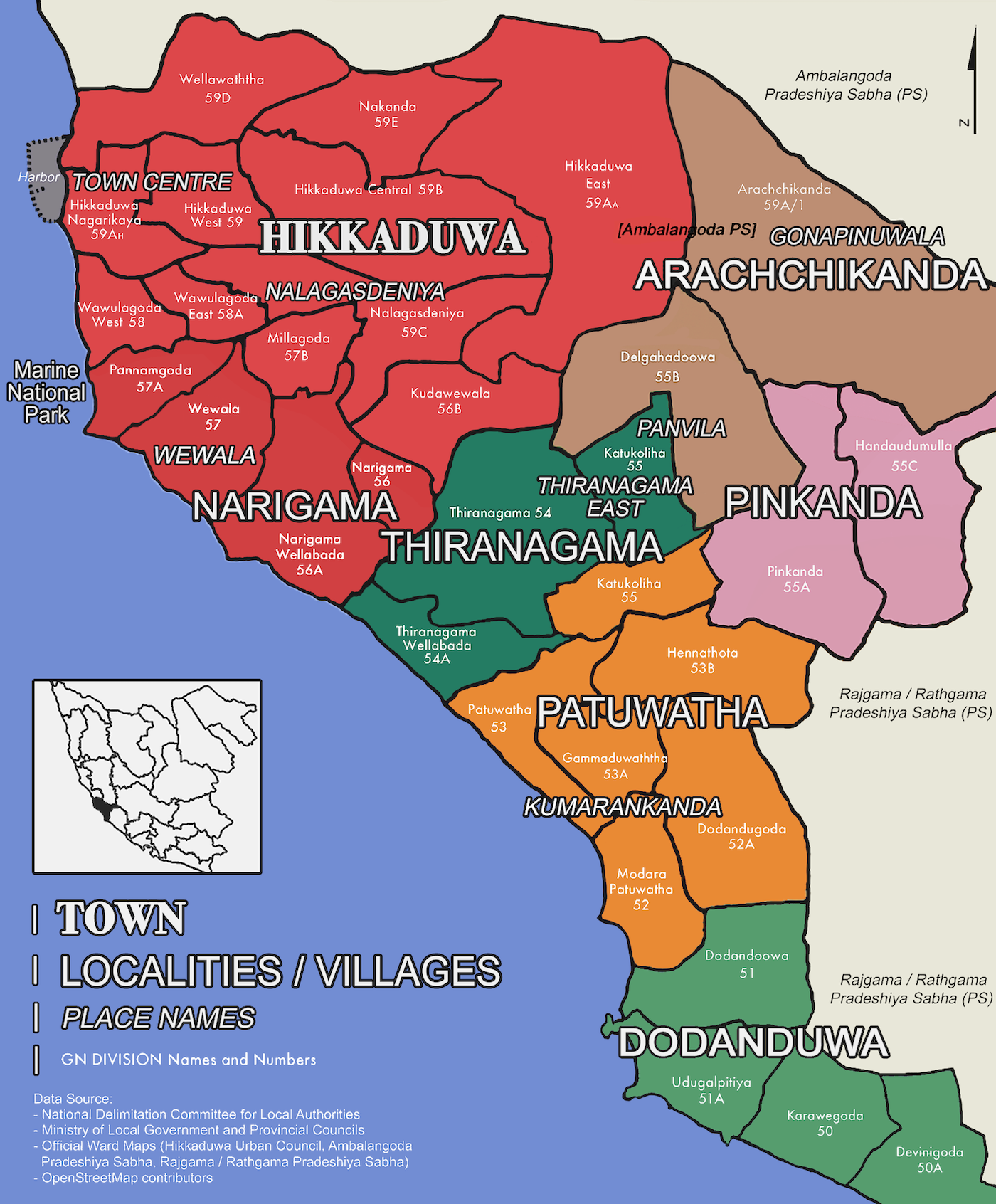
- Kumarakanda (on the Administrative Map of Hikkaduwa Urban Council)
- Coordinates: 6°06′46″N 80°07′40″E
- Country: Sri Lanka
- Province: Southern Province
- District: Galle District
- Hikkaduwa Urban Council: Hikkaduwa
- Time zone: UTC+5:30 (Sri Lanka Standard Time)

Kumarakanda is a coastal village situated in Galle District, Southern Province of Sri Lanka.

Integrated into Hikkaduwa Urban Council, it is located 6 kilometres (4 mi) south of Hikkaduwa.

== Geography ==
Kumarakanda is located approximately 15 kilometres (9 mi) north of Galle and 139 kilometres (86 mi) south of Colombo. Kumarakanda is administratively part of Patuwatha.

== Transport ==
=== Road ===
Located on the A2 highway (Colombo-Galle-Hambantota-Wellawaya) a part of the Colombo-Galle road.

=== Rail ===
Kumarakanda is located on the Coastal Line.

== Attractions ==
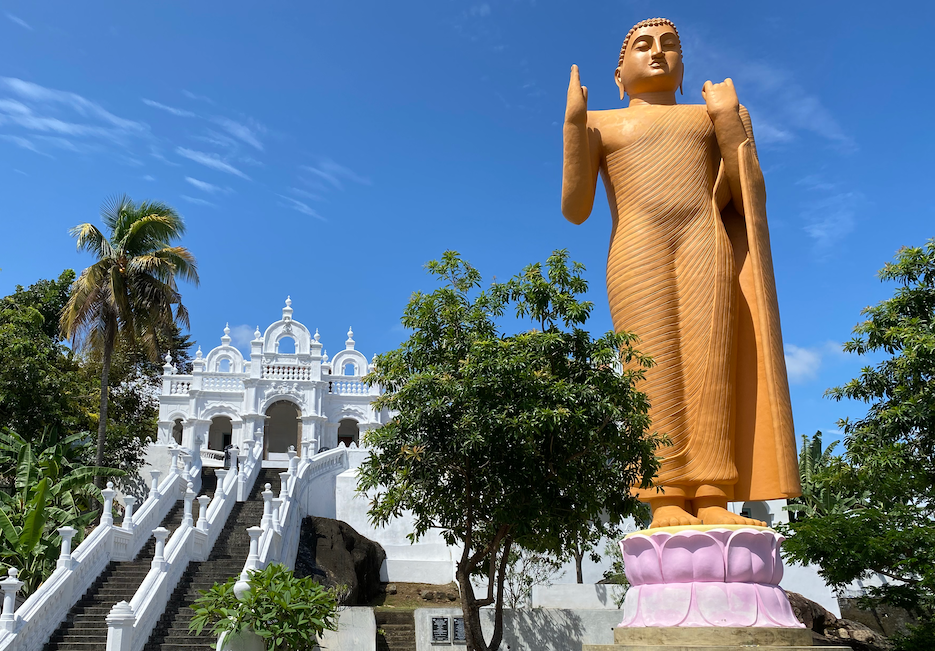
Kumarakanda Temple, Hikkaduwa

Kumarakanda is known for its Buddhist temple, Kumarakanda Kumara Maha Viharaya.

== See also ==
- Hikkaduwa
- Hikkaduwa Urban Council
- Thiranagama
- Dodanduwa
- Island Hermitage
- Galle Fort
- List of towns in Southern Province, Sri Lanka
