= Hikkaduwa Urban Council =

Local authority in Sri Lanka

Hikkaduwa Urban Council හික්කඩුව නගර සභාව

Type
- Type: Local urban authority

Leadership
- Chairman: Vinie Kariyawasam, United People's Freedom Alliance since March 2011
- Deputy Chairman: Waduge Priyantha, United National Party since March 2011
- Seats: 11

Elections
- Voting system: open list proportional representation system
- Last election: 2011 Sri Lankan local government elections

Website
- http://hikkaduwa.uc.gov.lk

Hikkaduwa Urban Council, in Galle District (Sri Lanka) is the local authority covering the three urban neighbourhoods of Hikkaduwa town plus eight villages around.

The total area is 12.83 km^{2} (4.95 sq mi). (4,9 sq mi), on eleven wards and 27 GN Divisions

== Description ==
The Hikkaduwa Urban Council jurisdiction has an area of 12.83 km^{2} (4.95 sq mi), that extends along the coastal zone for about 6 km (3.7 mi), and inland about 3 km (1.9 mi).

Its eleven constituencies are:

- three urban neighbourhoods of Hikkaduwa town itself (composed of eight GN Divisions); and
- eight constituencies for eight villages around (composed of nineteen GN Divisions)

The urban area is the town of Hikkaduwa.

The eight villages are:

- Wawulagoda (with the mainly urbanised GN Divisions Wewala and Narigama); and
- seven rural villages: Nalagasdeniya, Thiranagama, Katukoliha, Pinkanda, Patuwatha, Kumarakanda, Dodanduwa.

== Mission ==
The Hikkaduwa Urban Council, established in 2000, is responsible for providing a variety of local public services including roads, sanitation, drains, housing, libraries, public parks and recreational facilities. It has eleven councillors elected using an open list proportional representation system.

== Election results ==
=== 2011 local government election ===
Results of the local government election held on 17 March 2011:

Alliances and parties	Votes	%	Seats
United People's Freedom Alliance (NC, ACMC, SLFP et al.)	8,660	58.52%	7
United National Party	5,467	36.94%	4
People's Liberation Front	459	3.10%	0
Independent 2	190	1.28%	0
Independent 1	18	0.12%	0
Sinhalaye Mahasammatha Bhoomiputhra Pakshaya	5	0.03%	0
Valid Votes	14,799	96.59%	11
Rejected Votes	522		
Total Polled	15,328		
Registered Electors	21,131		
Turnout	72.54%		
