= Nalagasdeniya =

Village in sri lanka

Coordinates: 6°08′N 80°06′E

Nalagasdeniya is a small village in Hikkaduwa Divisional Secretary's Area in Galle District of Southern Province of Sri Lanka.
