= Hikkaduwa =

Town in Sri Lanka

Hikkaduwa හික්කඩුව கிக்கடுவை
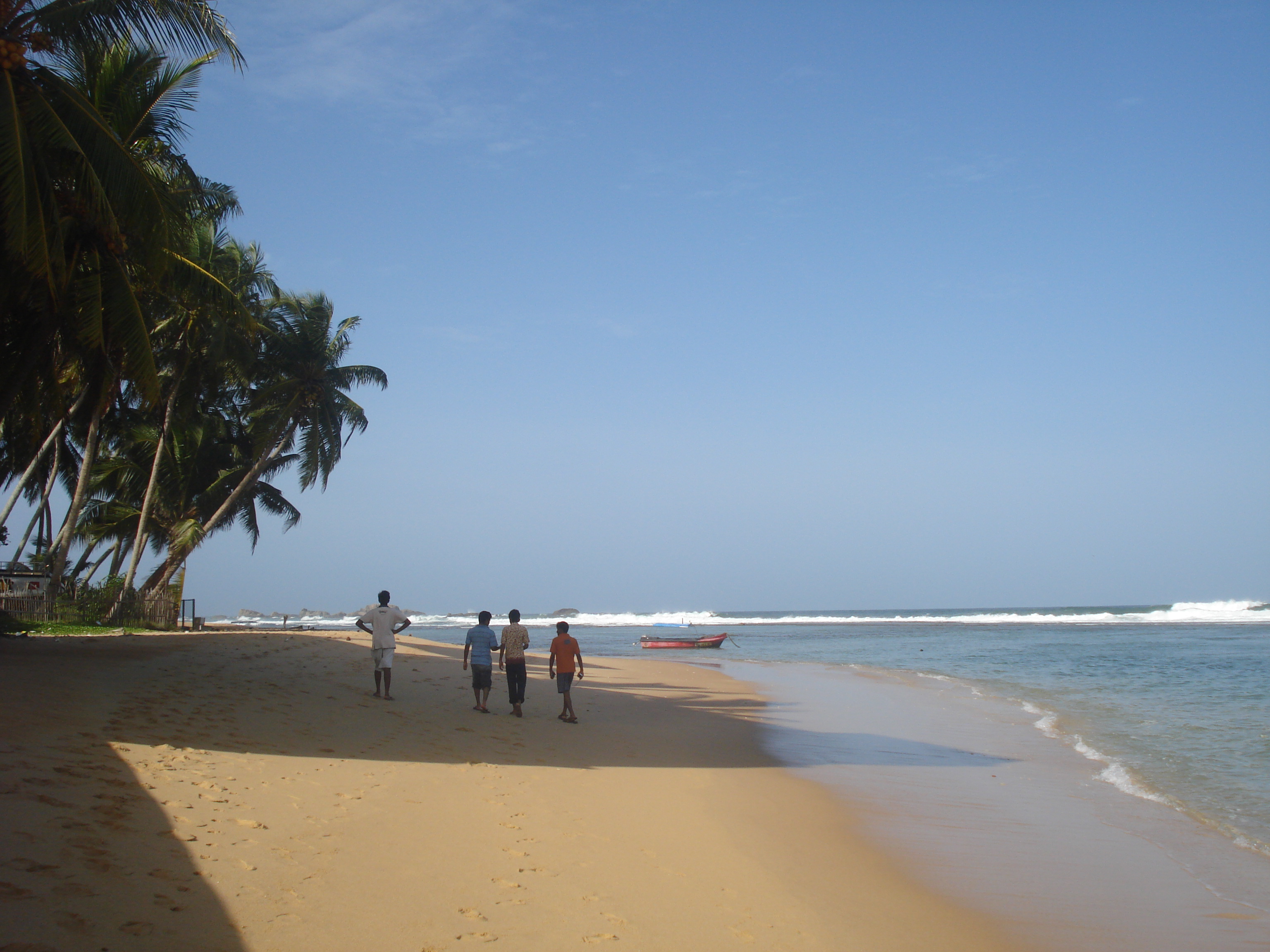
- Beach view in Hikkaduwa

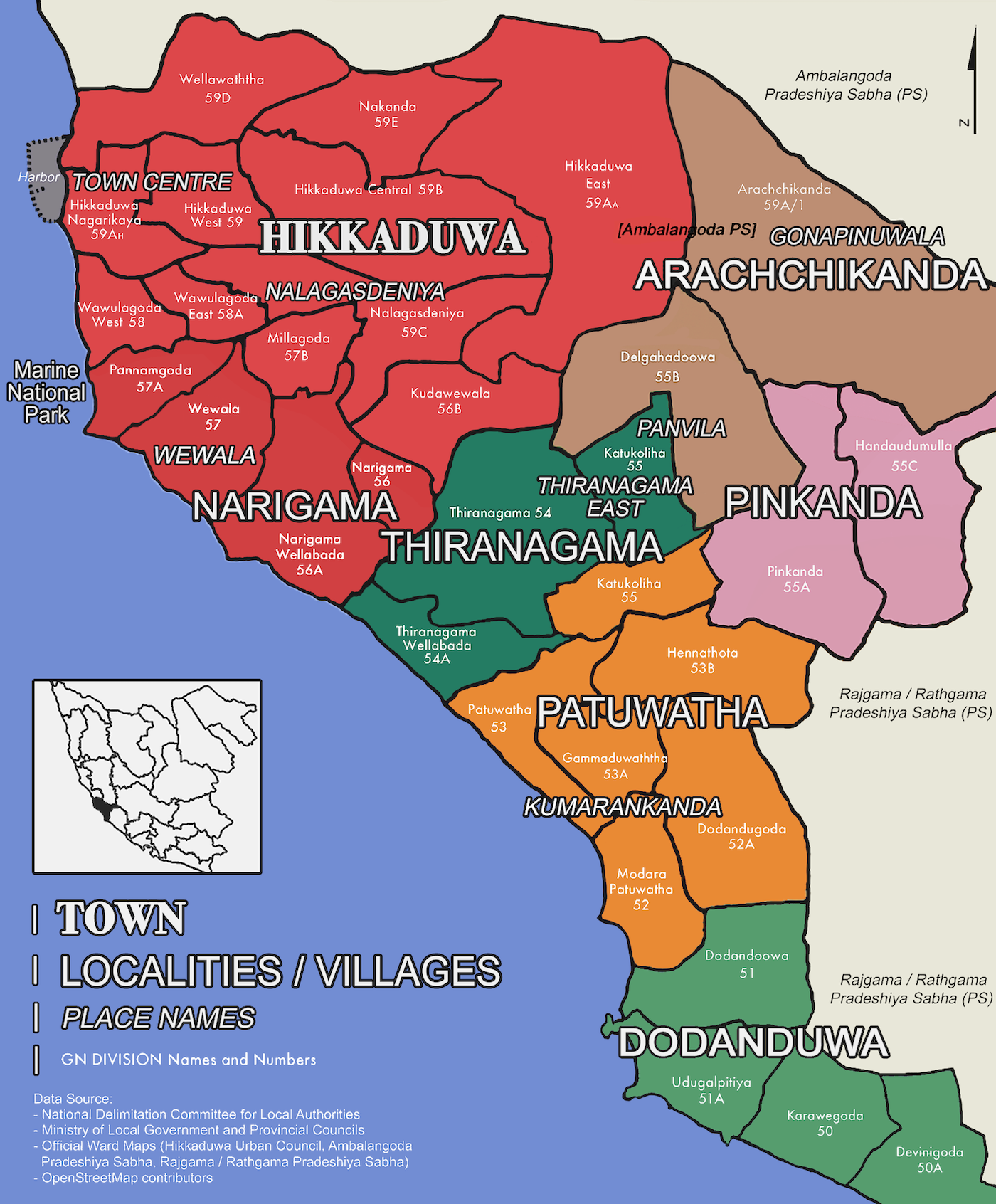
- Administrative map of Hikkaduwa region
- Country: Sri Lanka
- Province: Southern Province
- District: Galle District
- Areas: Townsite (from north to Baddegama Rd); Tourist hub (from Baddegama Rd: Wewala; Narigama [partly residential]; Thiranagama (upmarket area)
- Beaches: Turtle beach Hikkaduwa beach Narigama beach

Population
  - Total: 101,342
- Time zone: UTC+5:30 (Sri Lanka Standard Time Zone)
- Postal Code: 80240

Hikkaduwa, in south-west of Sri Lanka, is a large coastal area with eleven different villages over 6.5 km (4.0 mi) on the Indian Ocean, and 3 km (1.9 mi) inland, in the Galle District.

Located in the Southern Province of Sri Lanka, this area is under the dual jurisdiction of the Hikkaduwa Urban Council and the Hikkaduwa Divisional Secretariat with 24 km (15 mi) of coastline on the Indian Ocean.

The Hikkaduwa region is divided into several main areas (from north to south): the townsite; the tourist hub (from Baddegama Rd: Wewala; Narigama [partly residential area]; and the upmarket area of Thiranagama, which borders Narigama Beach, a 3 km (1.9 mi) stretch of sand extending from Narigama, running along Patuwatha down south to Dodanduwa.

== History ==
In the 19th century, during the British Ceylon period, Hikkaduwa region was "the great resort of picnic parties from Galle" (Galle was the largest city in southern Ceylon). Its economy was based on fishing and coconut cultivation, which was replaced by tourism when its golden sandy beaches were widely discovered.

In the 1960s, many hippies came to live in Hikkaduwa, which was nicknamed Hippiduwa.

The largest rail disaster in history has been caused in Hikkaduwa by the 2004 tsunami. A wall of water slammed an eight-carriage train in Peraliya in Hikkaduwa.

== Geography ==
Located in the Southern Province, Hikkaduwa is about 17 km (11 mi) north-west of Galle and 98 km (61 mi) south of Colombo. The Hikkaduwa region is divided into several main geographic zones (from north to south):

- Townsite (north part to Baddegama Road): with public infrastructure (bus stand, harbour, railway station), extending from the north to Baddegama Road (the region's widest road [up to 15 m (49 ft)] going east, and also serving as a bus bypass).
- Tourist Hub (from Baddegama Road to Narigama): with numerous hotels and restaurants, encompassing the Marine National Park and Turtle beach.
- Tourist Hotspot (Wewala, from Turtle beach to Narigama): contains large hotels (Hikka Tranz, Citrus), retail facilities, banks, numerous restaurants, bars, and dance clubs.
- Narigama (from Wewala to Thiranagama): on the ocean side, a lower-density tourist area with many hotels, restaurants and few dance clubs; becoming partly residential inland.

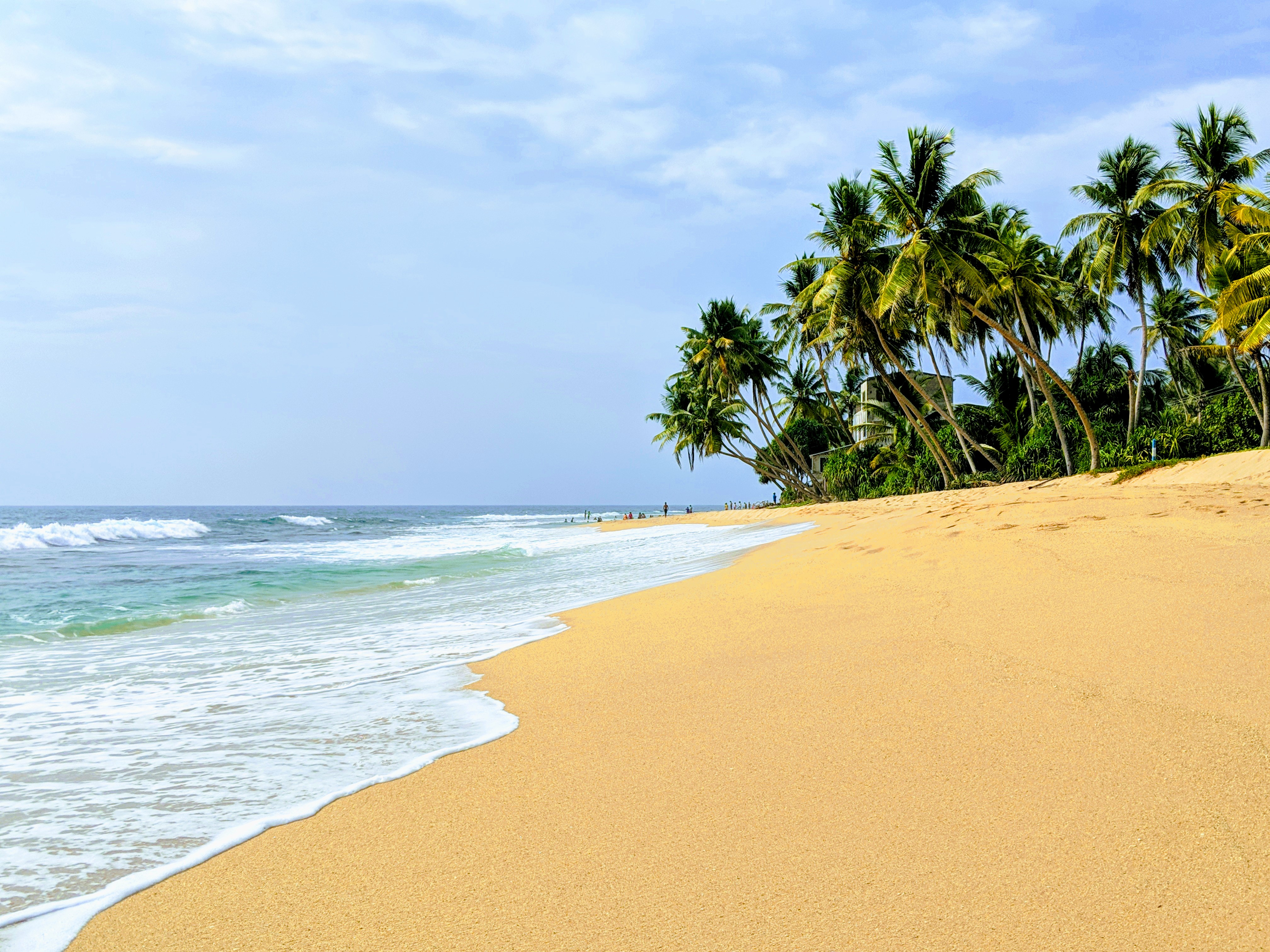
Hikkaduwa beach

- Thiranagama (from Narigama to Patuwatha): the upscale area where 5-star hotels are located (Haritha Villas, Riff Hotel)

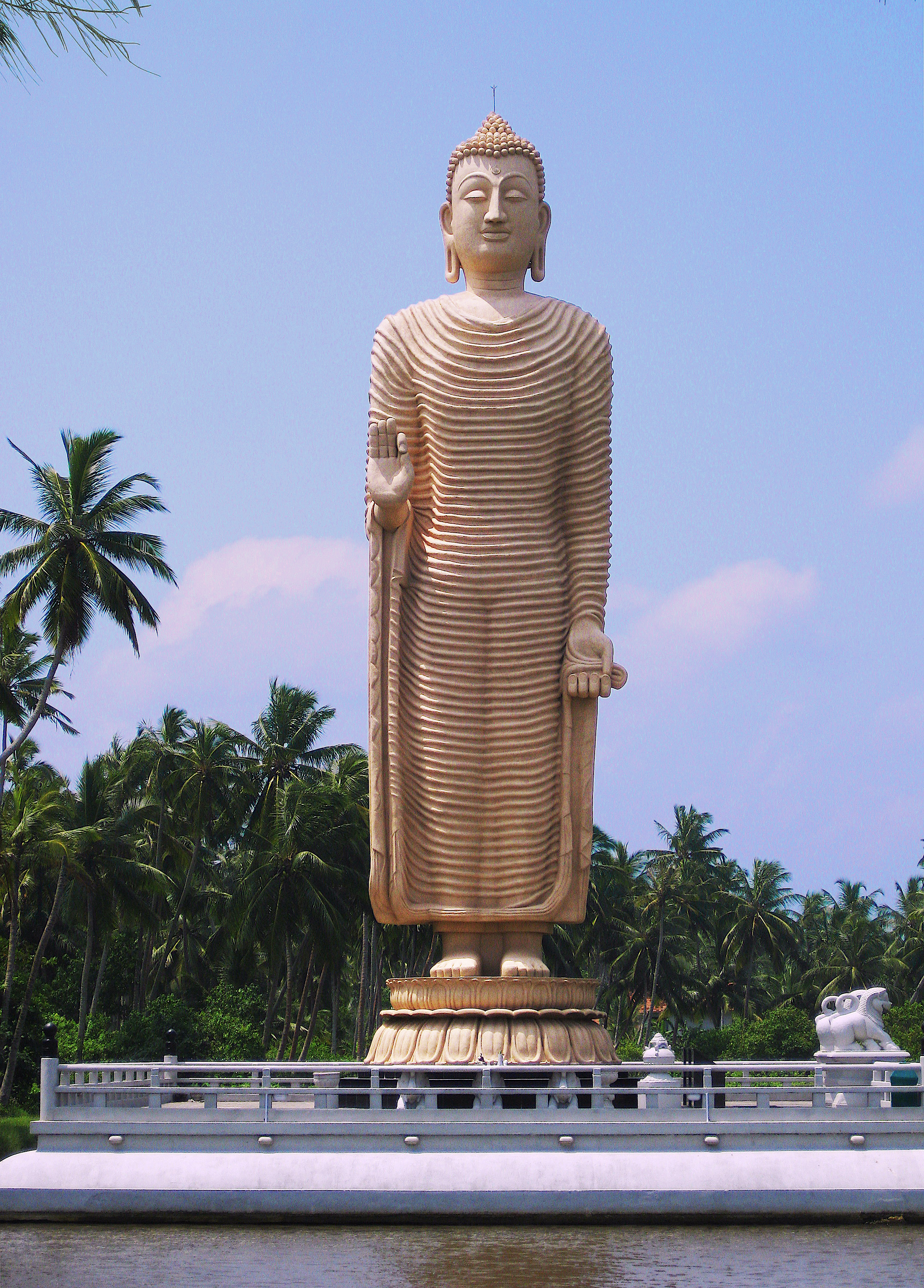
Big Buddha, rail accident memorial (2004 tsunami)

== Attractions ==
- Coral Sanctuary: the Hikkaduwa National Park was the first Marine sanctuary to be established in Sri Lanka. It has approximately seventy varieties of multi-coloured corals. In 2023, the Wildlife Conservation Department started to restore the coral reef and touching corals is now strictly prohibited (one offender was arrested and prosecuted in 2025).
- Nightlife: Hikkaduwa is famous for its nightlife. To prevent the fragmentation of the clientele, only one nightclub organises a main party each night, on a fixed weekly rotation.
- Surf: Hikkaduwa is a popular surfing location on the Sri Lankan south-west coast.and has many different surf spots. It attracts thousands of surfers between October/November and March/April. There are: shallow sand-bottomed waves, A-frame sections, harbourside waves, mellow whitewash to practice the pop, and fast left-hander waves.
- Big Buddha statue: The Buddha statue (Tsunami Honganji Viharaya) was built to commemorate the victims of the largest rail disaster in history caused by the 2004 tsunami, at Hikkaduwa, in Peraliya.
  Donated by Japan, this 30 m (98 ft) high statue is a replica of the 6th-century Buddhas of Bamiyan, destroyed by the Taliban in Afghanistan. It has been created using the earliest known sketches of those statues.

== Beaches ==
- Hikkaduwa Turtle Beach: located at the northern end of Hikkaduwa beach, is a popular spot for observing sea turtles in their natural habitat. The area supports several conservation centres that protect endangered species (incubate eggs, and release hatchlings into the ocean).
- Hikkaduwa Beach: a long, busy, and vibrant beach (Australians say that Hikkaduwa Beach is Sri Lanka's version of Kuta Beach (Bali)).
- Narigama beach: extends for 3 km (1.9 mi) towards the south, in a broad and continuous sandy beach, this wide beach is calm with some luxury hotels, restaurants, and several surf spots.

== Transport ==
Hikkaduwa is located on the Coastal or Southern Rail Line (connecting Colombo through to Matara) and by the A2 highway, connecting Colombo to Wellawaya.

=== Road bypass ===
The necessity of a bypass for Hikkaduwa has been highlighted for over 45 years. Government projects in 2003, and in 2011 (a 5 km (3.1 mi) road costing Rs.8B, approx. US$106M in 2026) were never realised.

Near the northern boundary of Hikkaduwa, Baddegama Road (the region's widest road, up to 15 m (49 ft)) became, in 2023, part of a new bypass. It complemented the construction of the 6 km (3.7 mi) Hikkaduwa Bypass New Road, 70% of which was completed by the end of 2023.

Its August 2024 opening was suspended by the Election Commission due to the 2024 presidential elections.

In 2025, the recently elected Hikkaduwa Urban Council began to implement a minor fraction of this bypass: a limited one-way southbound diversion, only for long-distance buses.

== Religions ==
Religious composition in Hikkaduwa DS Division according to the 2012 census is Buddhists 100,955 (99.06%), other Christians 317 (0.31%), Roman Catholics 293 (0.29%), Hindus 257 (0.25%), Islam 79 (0.08%), others 8 (0.01%).

== Notable people ==
- Ryan Reynolds, Canadian actor (Deadpool, Free Guy) stated in 2023 that “Hikkaduwa is his favourite movie shooting location of all time”.
- Sir Arthur C. Clarke, science fiction writer, author of 2001: A Space Odyssey owned and operated a diving station in Hikkaduwa.
- Hikkaduwe Sri Sumangala Thera, buddhist monk.

== See also ==
- Hikkaduwa National Park
- Hikkaduwa Urban Council
- Hikkaduwa Divisional Secretariat
- Thiranagama
- Dodanduwa
- 2004 Sri Lanka tsunami train wreck
- Galle Fort
