= Land use statistics by country =

This article includes the table with land use statistics by country. Countries are ranked by their total cultivated land area, which is the sum of the total arable land area and total area of permanent crops.

Arable land is defined as being cultivated for crops like wheat, maize, and rice, all of which are replanted after each harvest. Permanent cropland is defined as being cultivated for crops like citrus, coffee, and rubber, which are not replanted after each harvest; this also includes land under flowering shrubs, fruit trees, elm trees, and vines, but excludes land under trees grown for wood or timber. Other lands include any lands not arable nor under permanent crops; this includes permanent meadows and pastures, forests and woodlands, built-on areas, roads, barren land, and so on.

Percentage figures for arable land, permanent crops land and other lands are all taken from the CIA World Factbook as well as total land area figures (Note: the total area of a country is defined as the sum of total land area and total water area together.) All other figures, including total cultivated land area, are calculated on the basis of this mentioned dataset.

== List ==
Country	Cultivated land		Arable land			Permanent crops		Highly grown crops	Date
Country	(km^{2})	(%)	(km^{2})	(%)	Per capita	(km^{2})	(%)		Date
World	17,235,800	11.6	15,827,534	10.7	1.9	1,549,600	1.0	2011	
India	1,765,260	53.7	1,656,780	50.4	1.2	108,479	3.3	2020	
United States	1,681,826	17.1	1,652,028	16.8	4.9	29,798	0.3	2020	
China	1,476,925	15.4	1,275,799	13.3	0.9	201,126	2.1	2023	
Russia	1,265,267	7.4	1,248,169	7.3	8.6	17,098	0.1	2011	
Brazil	800,485	9.4	570,572	6.7	2.7	68,126	0.8	2011	
Canada	519,205	5.2	429,355	4.3	10.7	49,924	0.5	2011	
Australia	487,695	6.3	307,520	4.0	11.4	7,741	0.1	2011	
Indonesia	478,055	25.1	247,598	13.0	0.9	230,457	12.1	2011	
Nigeria	412,938	44.7	354,726	37.3	1.6	68,361	7.4	2011	
Argentina	397,598	14.3	328,087	13.9	7.2	11,122	0.4	2016	
Ukraine	347,673	57.6	342,901	56.1	8.7	9,054	1.5	2011	
Sudan	296,289	15.9	204,710	11.0	3.9	3,723	0.2	2011	
Mexico	259,301	13.2	202,229	11.8	1.6	27,502	1.4	2011	
Kazakhstan	242,516	8.9	221,059	8.9	10.6	0	0.0	2011	
Turkey	240,553	30.7	209,211	26.7	2.4	31,342	4.0	2011	
Pakistan	227,686	28.7	219,724	27.6	0.9	7,962	1.1	2011	
France	226,617	35.2	180,955	32.8	2.8	11,588	1.8	2011	
Thailand	203,188	39.6	158,035	30.8	2.2	45,153	8.8	2011	
Iran	197,794	12.0	158,208	9.6	1.7	19,788	1.2	2011	
Ethiopia	180,001	16.3	167,854	15.2	1.5	12,147	1.1	2011	
Spain	171,836	34.0	125,845	24.9	2.6	45,991	9.1	2011	
Tanzania	157,252	16.6	142,763	15.0	–	21,788	2.3	2011	
Niger	155,968	12.4	155,841	12.3	–	127	0.1	2011	
Myanmar (Burma)	114,341	18.7	111,639	16.5	–	14,885	2.2	2011	
South Africa	124,338	10.2	120,780	9.9	1.9	3,647	0.3	2011	
Germany	123,879	34.7	119,344	33.4	1.4	2,142	0.6	2011	
Poland	117,262	37.5	113,197	36.2	3.0	4,065	1.3	2011	
Uganda	109,896	45.6	82,917	34.3	–	27,233	11.3	2011	
Vietnam	108,302	32.7	68,227	20.6	0.7	40,075	12.1	2011	
Philippines	108,000	36.0	54,600	18.2	0.5	53,400	17.8	2011	
Romania	97,744	41.0	93,214	39.1	4.9	4,530	1.9	2011	
Bangladesh	97,268	65.5	87,615	59.0	0.5	9,653	6.5	2011	
Italy	94,609	31.4	68,697	22.8	1.2	25,912	8.6	2011	
Morocco	91,111	20.4	78,155	17.5	–	12,951	2.9	2011	
Algeria	83,360	3.5	73,833	3.1	–	9,527	0.4	2016	
Afghanistan	78,916	12.1	77,612	11.9	–	1,304	0.2	2016	
Cameroon	77,965	16.4	62,277	13.1	–	15,688	3.3	2011	
Cote d'Ivoire	75,143	23.3	29,348	9.1	–	45,795	14.2	2011	
Malaysia	73,568	22.3	9,567	2.9	0.3	64,001	19.4	2011	
Mali	70,691	5.7	69,451	5.6	–	1,240	0.1	2011	
Kenya	62,103	10.7	56,879	9.8	–	5,224	0.9	2011	
United Kingdom	61,631	25.3	60,171	24.7	0.9	487	0.2	2011	
Syria	57,783	31.2	47,041	25.4	–	10,742	5.8	2011	
Belarus	57,713	27.8	56,467	27.2	–	1,246	0.6	2011	
Paraguay	55,770	11.0	54,756	10.8	–	1,014	0.2	2011	
Tunisia	55,133	33.7	29,939	18.3	–	25,194	15.4	2011	
Peru	53,878	4.2	39,841	3.1	–	14,137	1.1	2011	
Mozambique	53,560	6.7	51,162	6.4	–	2,398	0.3	2011	
Chad	50,076	3.9	35,258	3.9	–	0	0.0	2011	
Uzbekistan	48,766	10.9	45,187	10.1	–	3,579	0.8	2011	
Japan	47,250	12.5	44,226	11.7	0.4	3,024	0.8	2011	
Hungary	46,965	50.5	45,105	48.5	–	1,860	2.0	2011	
Malawi	46,926	39.6	45,267	38.2	–	1,659	1.4	2011	
Ghana	46,207	32.6	28,393	20.7	–	17,814	11.9	2011	
Burkina Faso	45,533	21.1	44,710	20.8	–	823	0.3	2011	
Cambodia	42,716	23.6	41,087	22.7	–	1,629	0.9	2011	
Democratic Republic of the Congo	42,208	1.8	37,518	1.6	0.3	4,690	0.2	2011	
Bolivia	41,762	3.8	39,564	3.6	–	2,198	0.2	2011	
Cuba	41,476	37.4	37,484	33.8	–	3,992	3.6	2011	
Madagascar	41,090	7.0	35,220	6.0	–	5,870	1.0	2011	
Iraq	39,009	8.9	36,817	8.4	–	2,192	0.5	2011	
Greece	37,752	28.6	26,004	19.7	2.6	11,748	8.9	2011	
Zambia	36,125	4.8	36,125	4.8	–	0	0.0	2011	
Egypt	36,054	3.6	28,042	2.8	–	8,012	0.8	2011	
Angola	52,361	4.2	48,621	3.9	–	3,740	0.3	2016	
Guinea	35,901	14.6	29,016	11.8	–	6,885	2.8	2011	
Venezuela	35,572	3.9	28,275	3.1	–	7,297	0.8	2011	
Bulgaria	35,323	31.4	33,159	29.9	–	2,164	1.5	2011	
Senegal	34,816	17.7	34,226	17.4	–	590	0.3	2011	
Saudi Arabia	34,400	1.6	32,250	1.5	0.9	2,150	0.1	2011	
Colombia	34,170	3.0	15,946	1.4	–	18,224	1.6	2011	
Czech Republic	33,138	42.0	32,349	41.0	–	789	1.0	2011	
Serbia	31,853	41.1	29,218	37.7	4.4	2,635	3.4	2011	
Benin	29,726	26.4	25,785	22.9	–	3,941	3.5	2011	
Ecuador	29,221	10.3	13,334	4.7	–	15,887	5.6	2011	
North Korea	29,124	21.4	15,808	19.5	–	13,316	1.9	2011	
Sweden	28,819	6.4	24,019	6.4	2.3	0	0.0	2011	
Togo	27,832	49.0	25,674	45.2	–	2,158	3.8	2011	
Denmark	25,429	59.0	25,386	58.9	4.2	43	0.1	2011	
Guatemala	25,047	23.0	15,464	14.2	–	9,583	8.8	2011	
Finland	25,019	7.4	25,019	7.4	4.4	0	0.0	2011	
Nepal	23,993	16.3	22,227	15.1	–	1,766	1.2	2011	
Sri Lanka	23,944	36.5	13,579	20.7	–	10,365	15.8	2011	
Lithuania	23,117	35.4	22,790	34.9	–	327	0.5	2011	
Azerbaijan	22,083	25.5	19,745	22.8	–	2,338	2.7	2011	
Moldova	21,764	64.2	18,679	55.1	–	3,085	9.1	2011	
Kyrgyzstan	21,400	7.1	13,400	6.7	–	8,000	0.4	2011	
Libya	21,114	1.2	17,595	1.0	–	3,519	0.2	2011	
Turkmenistan	20,496	4.2	20,008	4.1	–	488	0.1	2011	
Nicaragua	19,554	15.0	16,295	12.5	–	3,259	2.5	2011	
Sierra Leone	18,857	26.3	16,778	23.4	–	2,079	2.9	2011	
Central African Republic	18,690	3.0	18,067	2.9	–	623	0.1	2011	
Uruguay	18,215	10.3	17,798	10.1	–	417	0.2	2011	
Portugal	18,144	19.7	10,960	11.9	1.1	7,184	7.8	2011	
South Korea	17,347	17.5	15,254	15.3	0.3	2,193	2.2	2011	
Yemen	16,684	2.8	11,616	2.2	–	1,320	0.6	2011	
Laos	16,340	6.9	14,682	6.2	–	1,658	0.7	2011	
Chile	16,022	2.3	12,854	1.7	0.6	3,168	0.6	2011	
Burundi	15,151	54.5	10,814	38.9	–	4,337	15.6	2011	
Rwanda	15,017	57.1	12,361	47.0	–	2,656	10.1	2011	
Honduras	14,684	13.1	10,201	9.1	–	4,483	4.0	2011	
Austria	14,515	17.3	13,844	16.5	–	671	0.8	2011	
Slovakia	14,357	29.3	14,161	28.9	–	196	0.4	2011	
Haiti	13,538	48.7	10,703	38.5	–	2,835	10.2	2011	
Dominican Republic	13,000	26.7	8,084	16.6	–	4,916	10.1	2011	
Netherlands	12,824	30.9	12,367	29.8	–	457	1.1	2011	
Latvia	12,662	18.7	12,016	18.6	–	646	0.1	2011	
Somalia	11,479	1.8	11,479	1.8	–	0	0.0	2011	
Bosnia and Herzegovina	11,110	21.7	10,086	19.7	–	1,024	2.0	2011	
Ireland	10,826	15.4	10,826	15.4	–	0	0.0	2011	
Papua New Guinea	10,182	2.2	3,240	0.7	–	6,942	1.5	2011	
Tajikistan	10,087	7.0	8,790	6.1	–	1,297	0.9	2011	
Croatia	9,905	17.5	9,056	16.0	–	849	1.5	2011	
El Salvador	9,108	44.0	6,852	33.1	–	2,256	10.9	2011	
Belgium	8,540	28.0	8,296	27.2	–	244	0.8	2011	
Namibia	8,243	1.0	8,243	1.0	–	0	0.0	2011	
Liberia	8,132	7.3	5,793	5.2	–	2,339	2.1	2011	
Eritrea	7,997	6.8	7,997	6.8	–	0	0.0	2011	
Panama	7,389	9.8	5,504	7.3	–	1,885	2.5	2011	
Albania	7,359	25.6	6,497	22.6	–	862	3.0	2016	
Norway	7,124	2.2	7,124	2.2	–	0	0.0	2011	
Estonia	6,780	15.0	6,735	14.9	–	45	0.1	2011	
Mongolia	6,256	0.4	6,256	0.4	–	0	0.0	2011	
Republic of the Congo	6,156	1.8	5,472	1.6	–	684	0.2	2011	
Costa Rica	5,928	11.6	2,504	4.9	–	3,424	6.7	2011	
New Zealand	5,642	2.1	4,838	1.8	–	806	0.3	2011	
Guinea-Bissau	5,451	15.1	2,960	8.2	–	2,491	6.9	2011	
Georgia	5,298	7.6	4,043	5.8	–	1,255	1.8	2011	
Armenia	5,257	17.7	4,693	15.8	–	564	1.9	2011	
Gabon	4,818	1.8	3,212	1.2	–	1,606	0.6	2011	
Guyana	4,730	2.2	4,515	2.1	–	215	0.1	2011	
Gambia	4,690	41.5	4,633	41.0	–	57	0.5	2011	
North Macedonia	4,575	17.8	4,215	16.4	–	360	1.4	2011	
Switzerland	4,461	10.8	4,213	10.2	–	248	0.6	2011	
Mauritania	4,124	0.4	4,124	0.4	–	0	0.0	2011	
Israel	3,640	17.5	2,850	13.7	–	790	3.8	2011	
Botswana	3,492	0.6	3,492	0.6	–	0	0.0	2011	
Lesotho	3,096	10.2	3,066	10.1	–	30	0.1	2011	
Jordan	2,681	3.0	1,787	2.0	–	894	1.0	2011	
Lebanon	2,517	24.2	1,238	11.9	–	1,279	12.3	2011	
Fiji	2,507	13.7	1,647	9.0	–	860	4.7	2011	
Jamaica	2,233	20.3	1,221	11.1	–	1,012	9.2	2011	
Timor-Leste	2,231	15.0	1,502	10.1	–	729	4.9	2011	
Palestine	2,023	18.4	953	7.4	–	1,070	11.0	2011	
Slovenia	1,970	9.7	1,706	8.4	–	264	1.3	2011	
Montenegro	1,950	14.1	1,784	12.9	–	166	1.2	2011	
Eswatini (Swaziland)	1,840	10.6	1,701	9.8	–	139	0.8	2011	
Equatorial Guinea	1,798	5.4	1,208	4.3	–	590	2.1	2011	
Comoros	1,709	76.3	1,046	46.7	–	663	29.6	2011	
Puerto Rico	1,684	12.2	911	6.6	–	773	5.6	2011	
Vanuatu	1,451	11.9	195	1.6	–	1,256	10.3	2011	
Cyprus	1,206	13.0	906	9.8	–	296	3.2	2011	
Bhutan	1,113	2.9	998	2.6	–	115	0.3	2011	
Belize	1,080	4.7	758	3.3	–	322	1.4	2011	
Solomon Islands	1,040	3.6	202	0.7	–	838	2.9	2011	
United Arab Emirates	836	1.0	418	0.5	–	418	0.5	2011	
Mauritius	824	40.4	764	38.4	–	60	2.0	2011	
Suriname	655	0.4	655	0.4	–	0	0.0	2011	
Luxembourg	636	24.6	620	24.0	–	16	0.6	2011	
Oman	619	0.2	310	0.1	–	309	0.1	2011	
Cape Verde	500	12.4	472	11.7	–	28	0.7	2011	
São Tomé and Príncipe	479	49.7	87	9.1	–	392	40.6	2011	
Trinidad and Tobago	471	9.2	251	4.9	–	220	4.3	2011	
Kiribati	411	50.7	22	2.7	–	389	48.0	2011	
Micronesia	361	51.4	40	5.7	–	321	45.7	2011	
Samoa	299	10.6	79	2.8	–	220	7.8	2011	
French Polynesia	290	7.0	29	0.7	–	261	6.3	2011	
Tonga	280	37.5	166	22.2	–	115	15.3	2011	
Dominica	237	32.0	57	8.0	–	180	24.0	2011	
Gaza Strip	180	50.0	104	29.0	–	76	21.0	2011	
Saint Lucia	176	29.0	39	6.5	–	137	22.6	2011	
Barbados	170	39.5	160	37.2	–	10	2.3	2011	
Kuwait	159	0.9	106	0.6	–	53	0.3	2011	
Brunei	156	3.0	110	2.1	–	46	0.9	2011	
Qatar	153	1.3	128	1.1	–	23	0.2	2011	
Saint Vincent and the Grenadines	140	35.9	70	18.0	–	70	18.0	2005	
Maldives	130	43.3	40	13.3	–	90	30.0	2005	
Grenada	121	35.3	20	5.9	–	101	29.4	2005	
Guam	118	21.8	20	3.6	–	98	18.2	2005	
Wallis and Futuna	118	42.9	20	7.1	–	98	35.7	2005	
Malta	109	34.4	99	31.3	–	10	3.1	2005	
Antigua and Barbuda	101	22.7	81	18.2	–	20	4.6	2005	
New Caledonia	100	0.5	59	0.3	–	41	0.2	2005	
Marshall Islands	100	55.6	20	11.1	–	80	44.4	2005	
Netherlands Antilles	96	10.0	96	10.0	–	0	0.0	2005	
Bahamas	87	0.9	58	0.6	–	29	0.3	2005	
Northern Mariana Islands	83	17.4	62	13.0	–	21	4.4	2005	
Iceland	70	0.1	70	0.1	–	0	0.0	2005	
Niue	70	26.9	30	11.5	–	40	15.4	2005	
Seychelles	69	15.2	10	2.2	–	59	13.0	2005	
Palau	60	13.1	40	8.7	–	20	4.4	2005	
Cook Islands	60	25.0	40	16.7	–	20	8.3	2005	
Saint Kitts and Nevis	58	22.2	51	19.4	–	7	2.8	2005	
Bahrain	56	8.5	19	2.8	–	37	5.6	2005	
Western Sahara	53	0.0	53	0.0	–	0	0.0	2005	
Isle of Man	51	9.0	51	9.0	–	0	0.0	2002	
American Samoa	49	21.9	30	13.4	–	19	8.5	2016	
British Virgin Islands	41	26.7	31	20.0	–	10	6.7	2005	
Liechtenstein	40	25.0	40	25.0	–	0	0.0	2005	
Faroe Islands	30	2.1	30	2.1	–	0	0.0	2005	
Saint Pierre and Miquelon	30	12.5	30	12.5	–	0	0.0	2005	
U.S. Virgin Islands	30	8.6	20	5.7	–	10	2.9	2005	
Aruba	20	10.5	20	10.5	–	0	0.0	2005	
Montserrat	20	20.0	20	20.0	–	0	0.0	2005	
Singapore	20	2.9	10	1.5	0.0	10	1.5	2005	
Tuvalu	17	66.7	0	0.0	–	17	66.7	2005	
Bermuda	11	20.0	11	20.0	–	0	0.0	2005	
Andorra	10	2.1	10	2.1	–	0	0.0	2005	
Turks and Caicos Islands	10	2.3	10	2.3	–	0	0.0	2005	
Cayman Islands	10	3.9	10	3.9	–	0	0.0	2005	
San Marino	10	16.7	10	16.7	–	0	0.0	2005	
Djibouti	9	0.0	9	0.0	–	0	0.0	2005	

== See also ==
- Exclusive economic zone
- Food and Agriculture Organization
