= Dodanduwa =

Dodanduwa දොඩන්දූව Dodandoowa
- Village
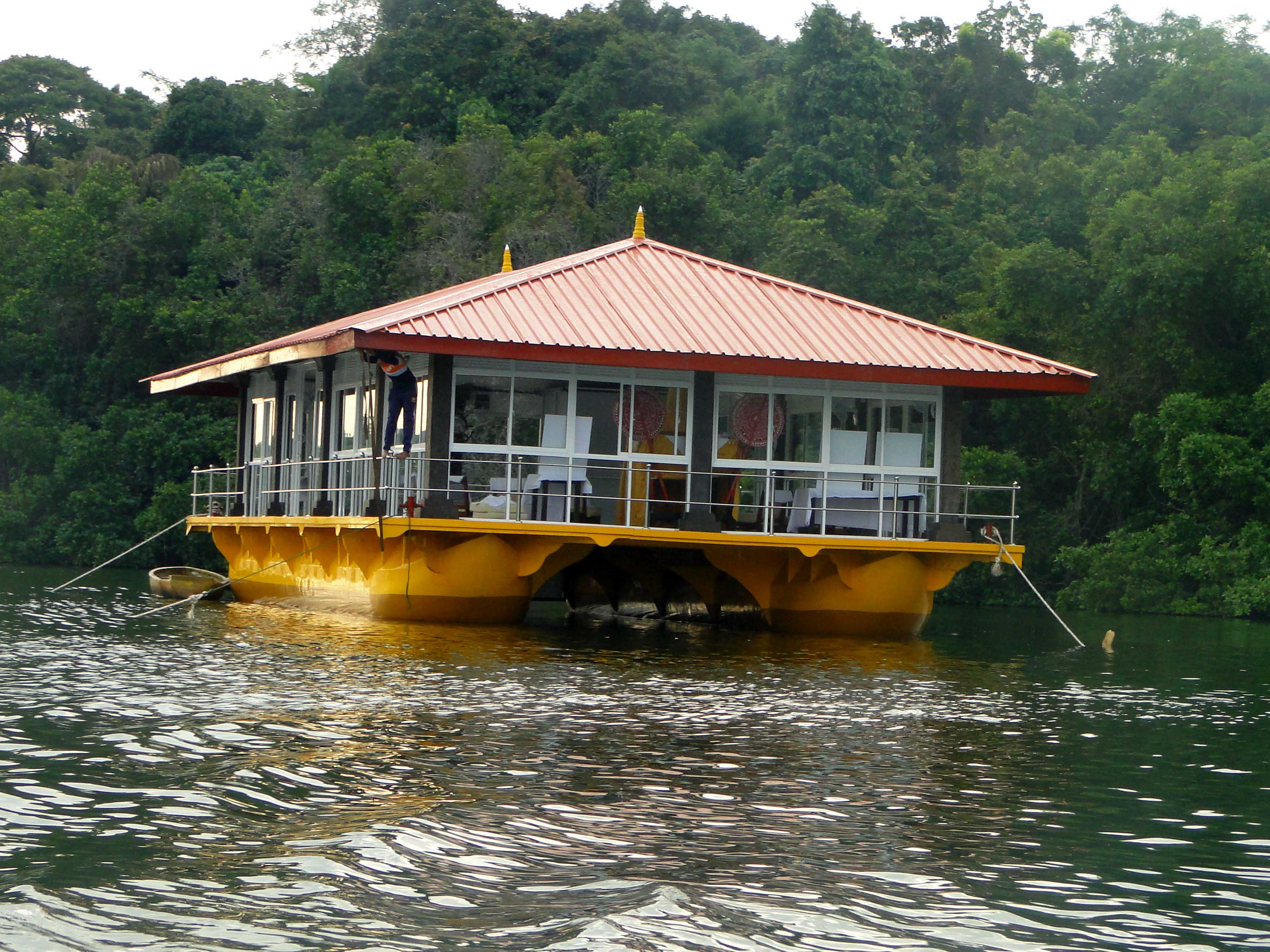
- Forest monks's chapter hall (to Island Hermitage)

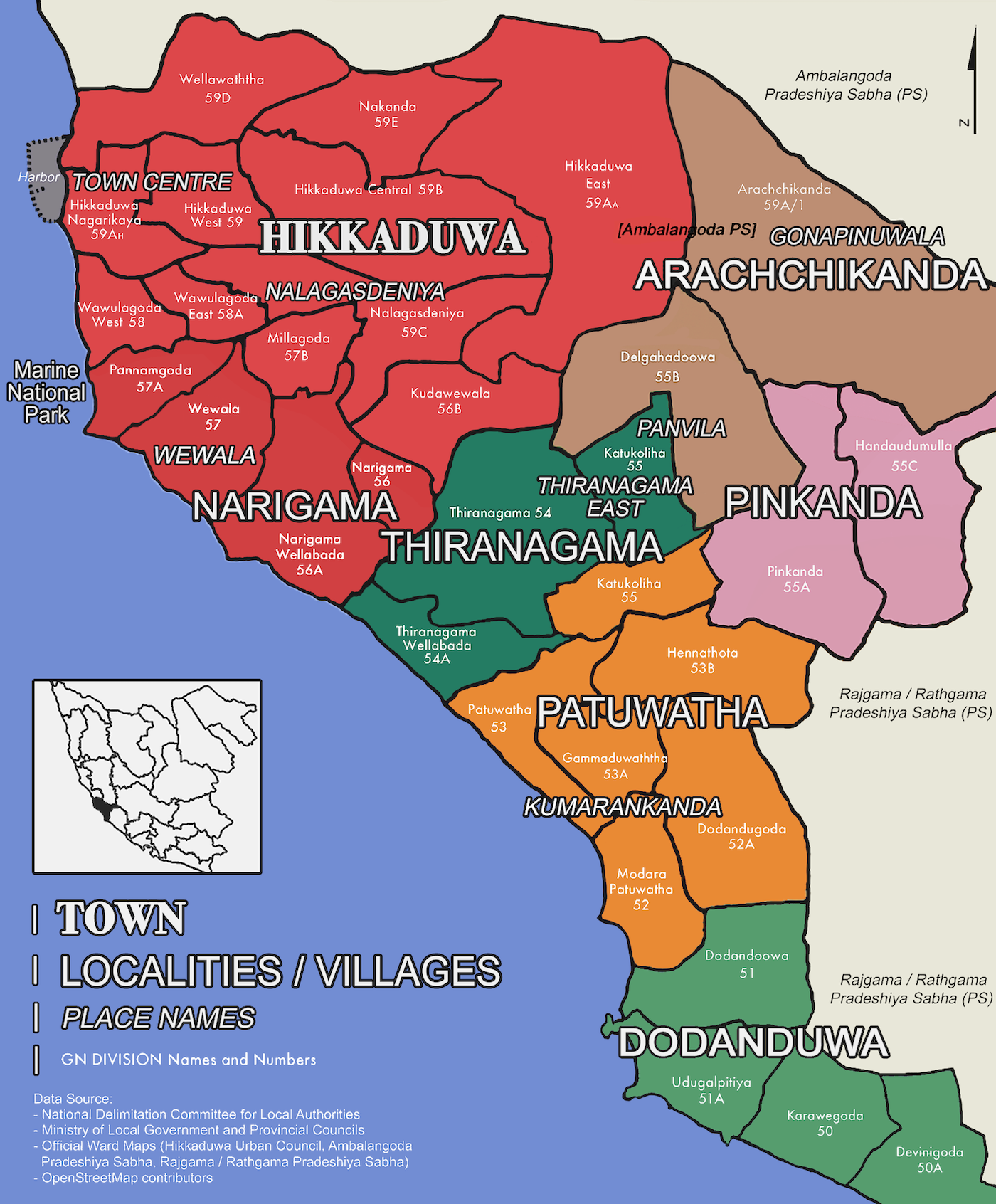
- Dodanduwa (on the Administrative Map of Hikkaduwa Urban Council)
- Coordinates: 6°5′48″N 80°8′44″E
- Country: Sri Lanka
- Province: Southern Province
- District: Galle District
- Hikkaduwa Urban Council: Hikkaduwa

Population (2001)
  - Total: 6,200
- Time zone: UTC+5:30 (Sri Lanka Standard Time)
- Postal code: 80250

Dodanduwa is a coastal village situated in Galle District, Southern Province of Sri Lanka, integrated into Hikkaduwa Urban Council.

Dodanduwa is known for a Buddhist Island Hermitage where monks follow the strict Sri Lankan Forest Tradition (meditation and loneliness).

== Geography ==
Dodanduwa is located approximately 14 kilometres (9 mi) north of Galle and 140 kilometres (87 mi) south of Colombo. It is situated to the south of Patuwatha and Kumarakanda villages.

Prior to the Second World War, Dodanduwa was known as the commercial centre for Salt Fish or Jaadi.

== Transport ==
=== Road ===
Located on the A2 highway (Colombo-Galle-Hambantota-Wellawaya) a part of the Colombo-Galle road.

=== Rail ===
Dodanduwa railway station is the 45th station on the Coastal Line and is located 101.5 km (63.1 mi) from Colombo. The station, constructed in 1900, has one platform and all non-express trains running on the Coastal Line stop at the station.

== Education ==
The Sri Piyaratana School at Dodanduwa is the first Buddhist School in the country, and was inaugurated by Sri Piyaratana Tissa Mahanayake Thero in 1869.

== Buddhist temples ==
- Island Hermitage
- Kumarakanda Temple (Kumarakanda Maha Viharaya)
- Shailabimbarama Maha Viharaya
- Morakola Gangarama Temple
- Rajarama Purana Viharaya

== Notable people ==
- Arnolis Weerasooriya - first Ceylonese Colonel of the Salvation Army

== See also ==
- Hikkaduwa
- Hikkaduwa Urban Council
- Thiranagama
- Galle Fort
- List of towns in Southern Province, Sri Lanka
