= 2004 Sri Lanka tsunami train wreck =

Deadliest rail disaster

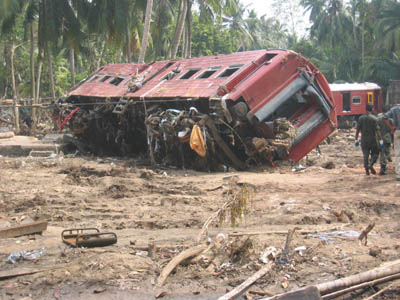
- One of the cars following the wreck (in Hikkaduwa)

- Location within Hikkaduwa (Sri Lanka)

Details
- Date: 26 December 2004; 21 years ago
- Location: Peraliya, Hikkaduwa
- Coordinates: 6°10′07″N 80°05′17″E
- Country: Sri Lanka
- Line: Coastal line
- Operator: Sri Lanka Railways
- Incident type: Flood
- Cause: Tsunami caused by 2004 Indian Ocean earthquake

Statistics
- Trains: 1 Train (No. 50)
- Deaths: Exact figures unknown, at least 900, most likely 1,700+
- Injured: 100+

On 26 December 2004, a crowded passenger train (#50 Matara Express) was destroyed on a coastal railway in Hikkaduwa, Sri Lanka, by the tsunami that followed the 2004 Indian Ocean earthquake. It is considered the largest rail disaster in history, with an estimated 900 to 1,700 deaths.

== Train ==
Train #50 Matara Express was a regular train operating between the cities of Colombo and Matara. The route runs along the southwestern coast of Sri Lanka, and at Telwatta, only about 200 metres (660 ft) inland from the sea. On Sunday, 26 December 2004, during both the Buddhist full moon holiday and the Christmas holiday weekend, it left Colombo's Fort Station shortly after 6:50 a.m. with over 1,500 paid passengers and an unknown number of unpaid passengers including the ones with travel passes (called Seasons) and government travel permits.

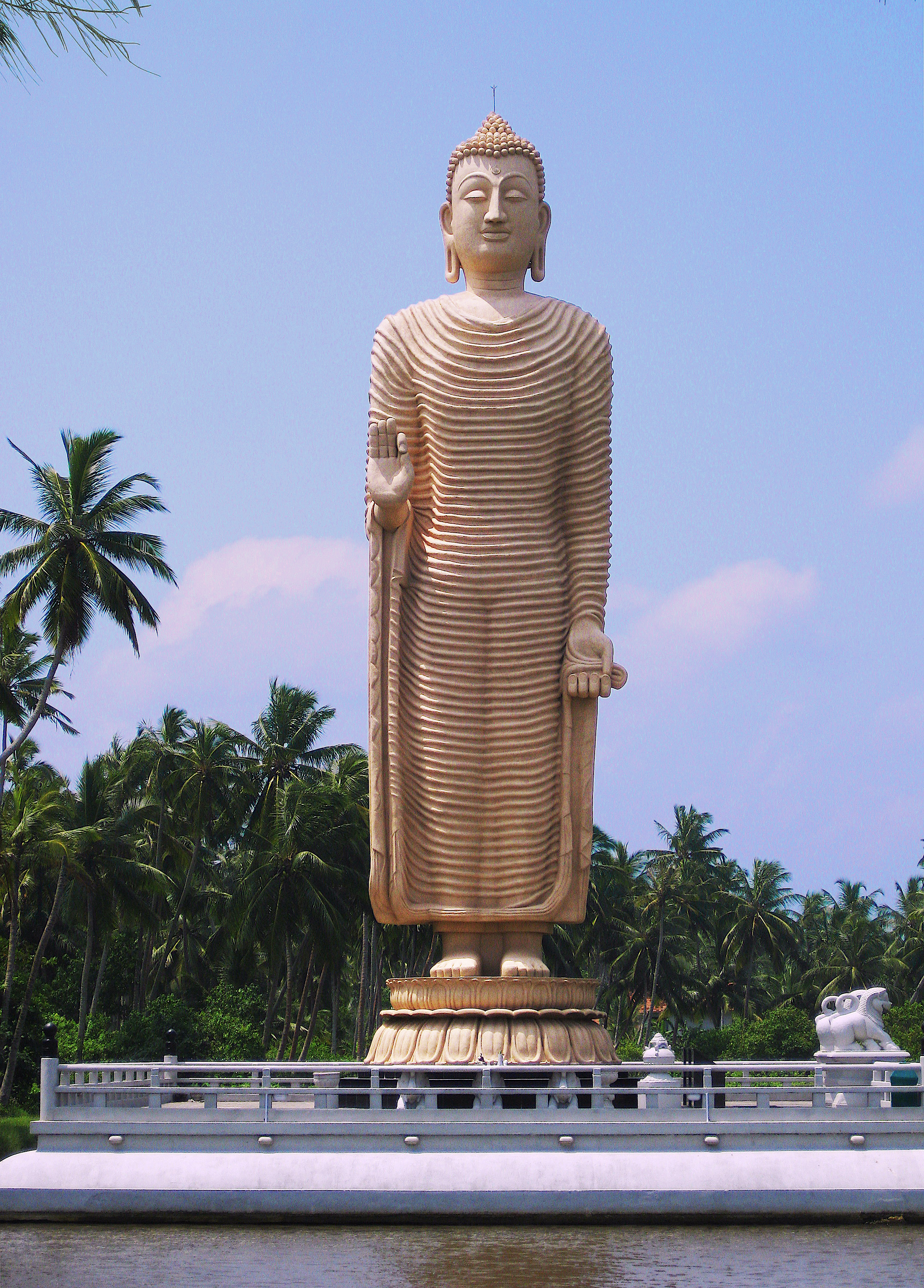
The Big Buddha statue in Hikkaduwa - Memorial Tsunami Honganji Viharaya

The train was pulled by locomotive #591 Manitoba, a Sri Lanka Railways class M2a built in 1956 by General Motors Diesel of Canada as a model G12.

== Attempts to stop the train ==
Sri Lanka's seismic monitoring station at Pallekele registered the earthquake within minutes but did not consider it possible for a tsunami to reach the island. When tsunami reports first reached the dispatching office in Maradana, officials were able to halt eight trains running on the Coastal Line, but were unable to reach the Matara Express.

Efforts to halt the train at Ambalangoda failed due to all station personnel assisting the train, leaving no one available to answer the phone until after the train had departed. Attempts to reach personnel at stations further south failed as they had fled or been killed by the waves.

== Tsunami hits the train ==
At 9:30 a.m., in the village of Peraliya, in Hikkaduwa, the beach saw the first of the gigantic waves thrown up by the earthquake. The train came to a halt as water surged around it, and an alarm sounded to alert the population about the increase in the water level. Hundreds of locals, believing the train to be secure on the rails, climbed onto the top of the cars to avoid being swept away. Others stood behind the train, hoping it would shield them from the force of the water. The first wave flooded the carriages and caused panic amongst the passengers. Ten minutes later a huge wave picked the train up and smashed it against the trees and houses which lined the track, crushing those seeking shelter behind it.

The eight carriages were so packed with people that the doors could not be opened while they filled with water, drowning almost everyone inside as the water washed over the wreckage several more times. The passengers on top of the train were thrown clear of the uprooted carriages, and most drowned or were crushed by debris. Locomotive #591 Manitoba was carried 100 metres (330 ft), coming to rest in a swamp. Both engineer Janaka Fernando and assistant Sivaloganathan died at their posts. Estimates based on the state of the shoreline and a high-water mark on a nearby building place the tsunami 7.5 to 9 metres (25 to 30 ft) above sea level and 2 to 3 metres (6.6 to 9.8 ft) higher than the top of the train.

== Casualties ==
Due to the huge scale of the tsunami disaster, local authorities were unable to cope with the devastation, and emergency services and the military were so overwhelmed that immediate rescue was not possible. In fact, the Sri Lankan authorities had no idea where the train was for several hours until it was spotted by an army helicopter around 4 p.m. The local emergency services were destroyed, and it was a long time before help arrived. Dozens of people badly injured in the disaster died in the wreckage during the day, and many bodies were not retrieved for over a week. Some families descended on the area determined to find their relatives themselves. A forensic team from Colombo photographed and fingerprinted the unclaimed bodies at Batapola Hospital so the records could be stored and looked at after the bodies were buried.

According to the Sri Lankan authorities, only about 150 people on the train survived. The estimated death toll was at least 1,000 people (possibly as many as 1,700), although only approximately 900 bodies were recovered, as many were swept out to sea or taken away by relatives. The town of Peraliya was also destroyed, losing hundreds of citizens and all but ten buildings to the waves. Baddegama Samitha, a Buddhist monk, helped perform funeral rites along with his students. More than 200 of the bodies retrieved were not identified or claimed, and were buried three days later in a Buddhist ceremony near the torn railway line.

== Aftermath ==
The first anniversary ceremonies were held in the rebuilt town alongside the repaired railway, which still operates a Colombo-to-Galle service, employing the same guard, Wanigaratna Karunatilleke, who was on the train and survived the disaster. Locomotive #591 Manitoba and two of the damaged carriages were salvaged and rebuilt. A wave was added to the locomotive's paint job as a memorial. The rebuilt locomotive and carriages returned to Peraliya on 26 December 2008, and every year since, to take part in a religious ceremony and a memorial, held to remember those who lost their lives.

== Memorial ==
The Big Buddha Statue (Tsunami Honganji Viharaya) was built in remembrance of the 2004 Indian Ocean tsunami victims and to protect the people from harm. Donated by Japan, the statue (30 m (98 ft) high) is a replica of the 6th-century Buddhas of Bamiyan destroyed by Taliban in Afghanistan. It was created using the earliest known sketches of the statue.

== See also ==
- List of rail accidents (2000–09)
- Transport in Sri Lanka
- Sri Lanka Railways
