= Thiranagama =

Thiranagama Sinhala: තිරාණගම – Tamil: திரணகம
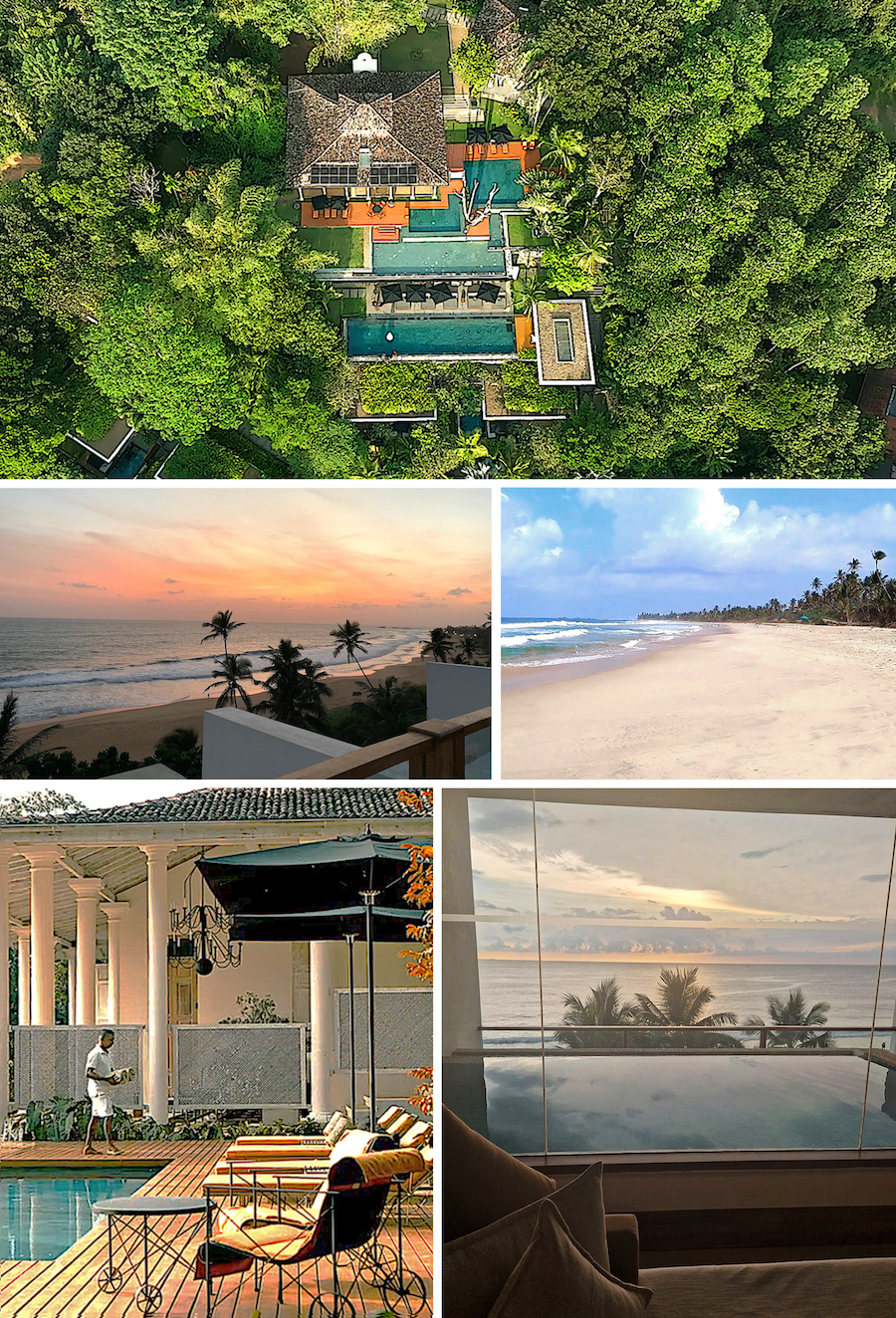
- Thiranagama places

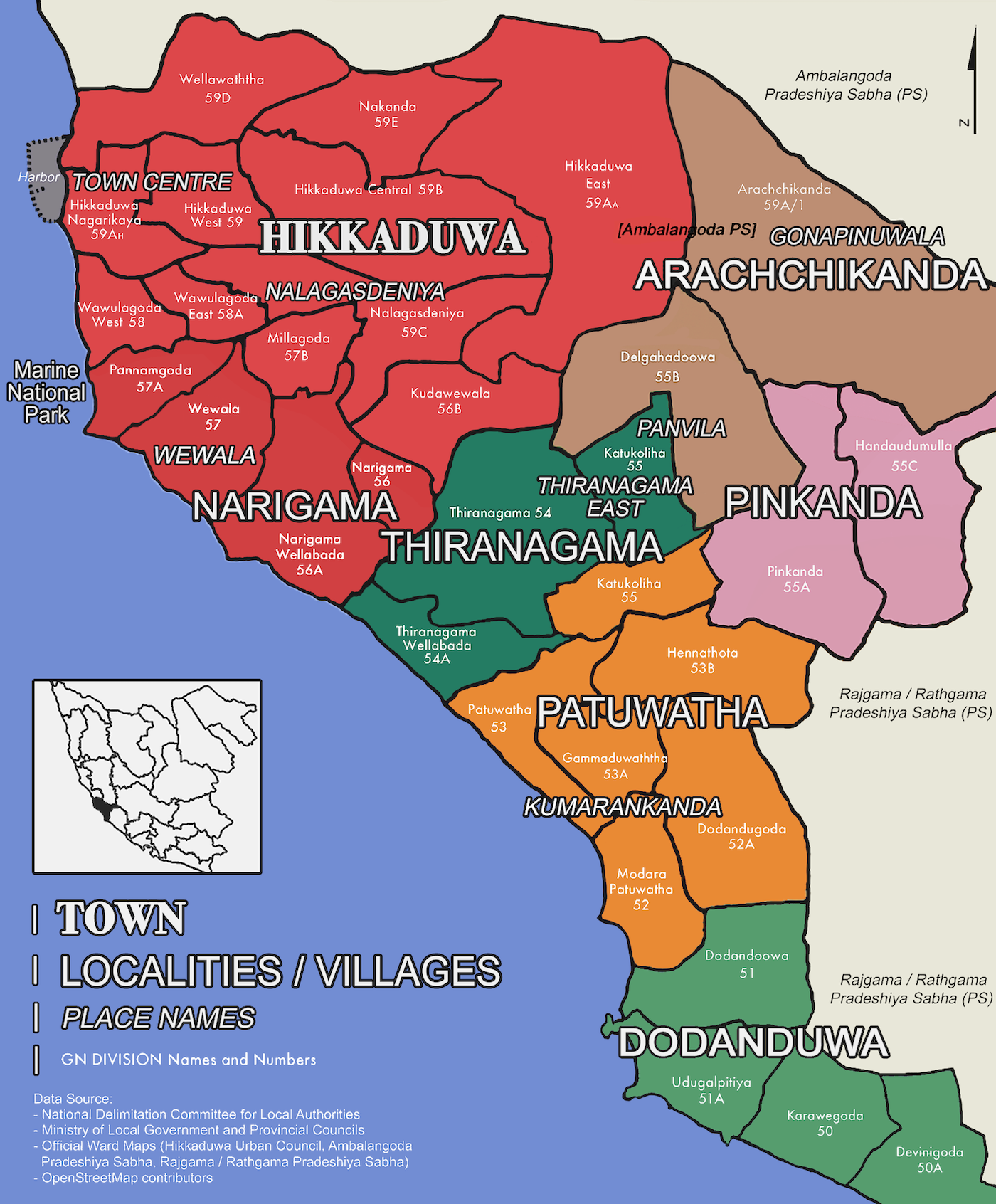
- Administrative map
- Country: Sri Lanka
- Province: Southern Province
- District: Galle
- Divisional Secretariat: Hikkaduwa DS
- Grama Niladhari: 54, 54A, 55 (part)
- Time zone: UTC+5:30 (SLST)
- Postal codes in Sri Lanka: 80244

Thiranagama is a coastal village by the Indian Ocean in the southwestern Galle District of Sri Lanka known as the upscale areaof the Hikkaduwa region.

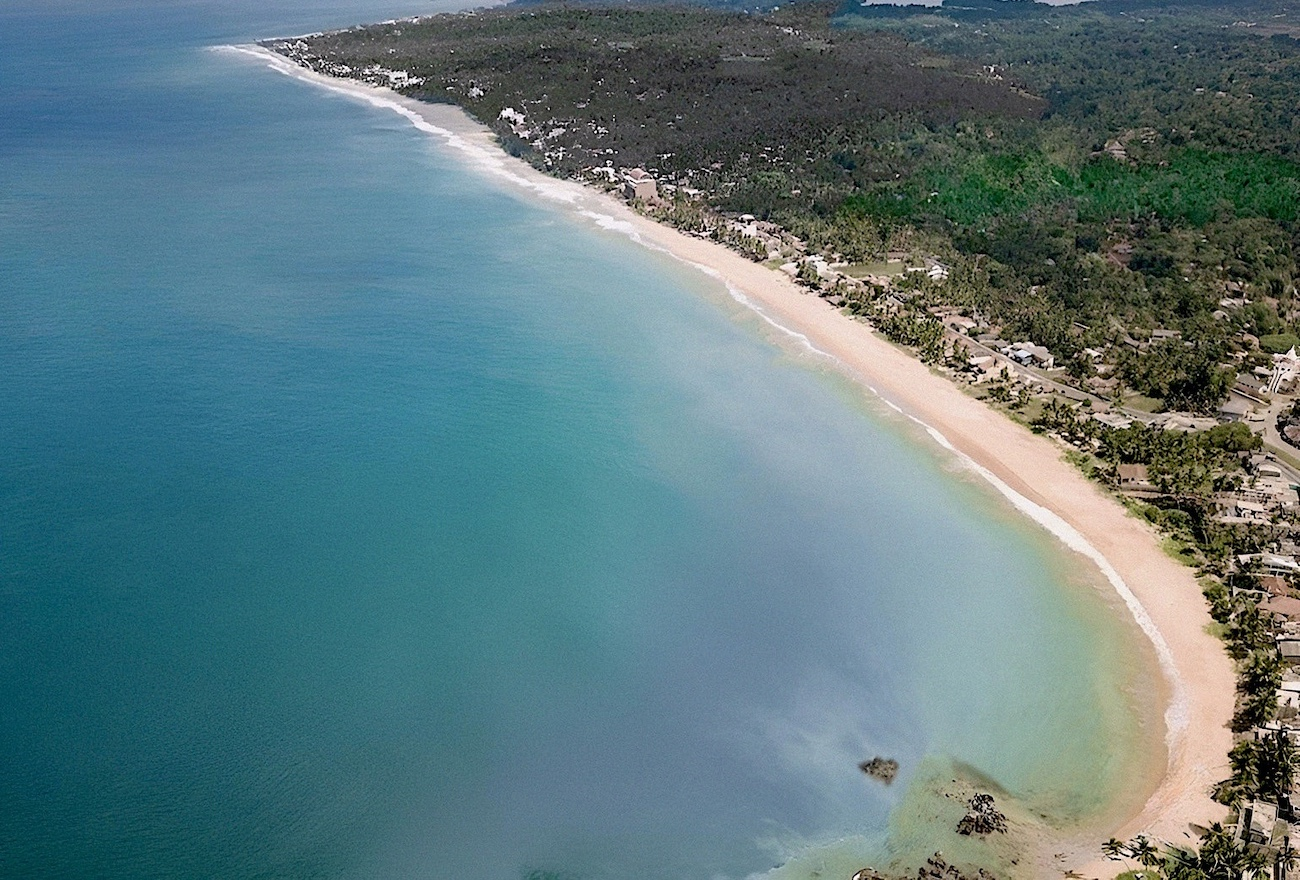
Aerial view of Thiranagama and Narigama beaches

== Geography ==
Thiranagama is located 16 km (9.9 mi) north of Galle and 99 km (62 mi) south of Colombo.

=== Boundaries ===
To the north, Thiranagama is bordered by the Narigama GN division (a partly residential area situated before Wewala). To the south, it extends to the beachfront area of Patuwatha, stretching towards Dodanduwa village. The western boundary is formed by Narigama beach, which extends over 3 km (1.9 mi).

=== Coastline ===
Thiranagama is bordered by Narigama beach, which extends over 3 km (1.9 mi). It stretches along four villages and has restaurants and hotels.

To the north, 4 km (2.5 mi) from Thiranagama, are located Turtle beach and Hikkaduwa National Park.

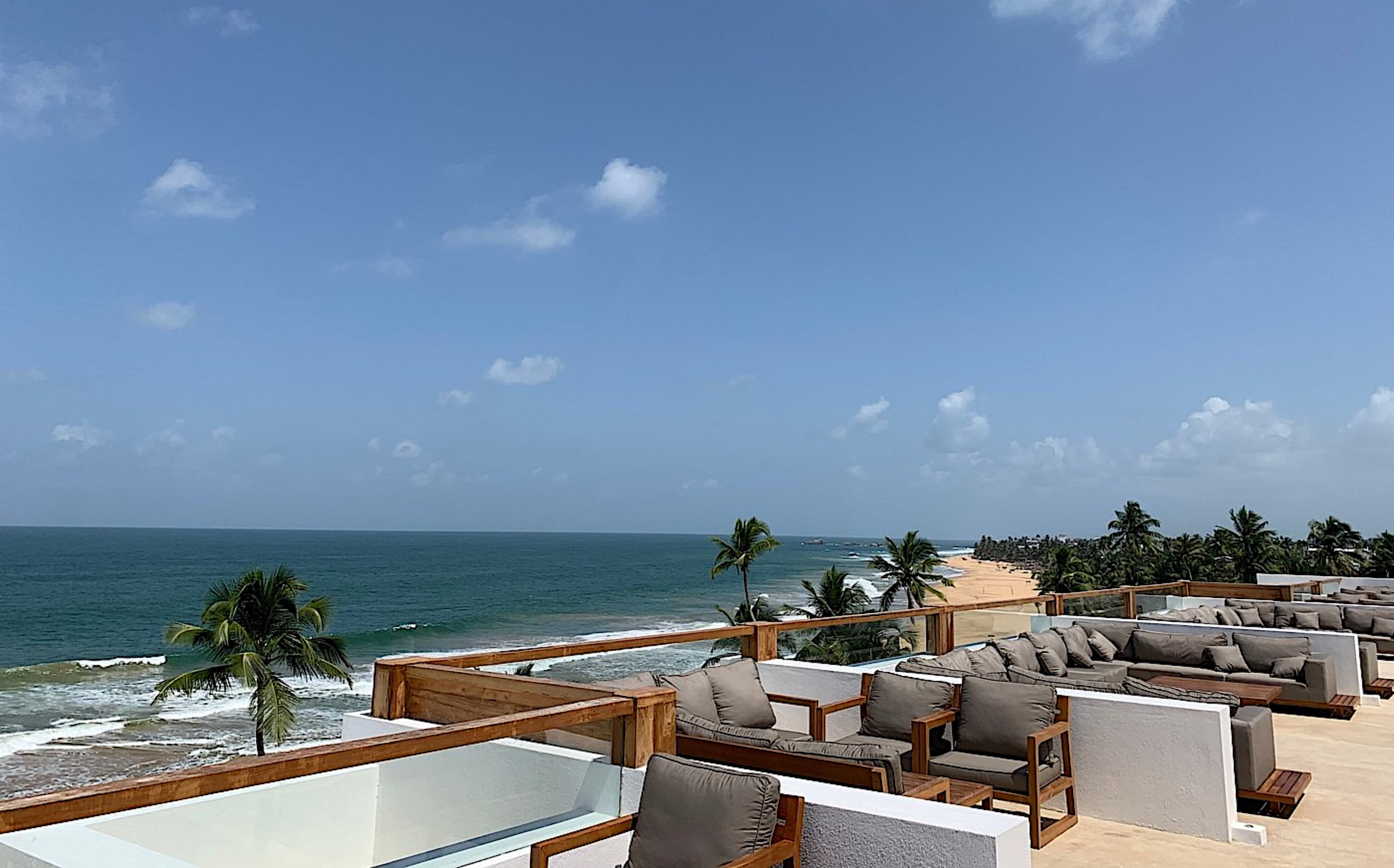
Coastal view from a hotel rooftop

Located 2 km (1.2 mi) south just beyond the fishing village of Dodanduwa, lies the Dodanduwa beach.

=== Administrative divisions ===
Thiranagama comprises three Grama Niladhari Divisions (GN):

- GN 54 – Thiranagama
- GN 54A – Thiranagama Wellabada
- GN 55 – Katukoliha (partially; the section north of Pinkada Road constitutes the area named Thiranagama East)

=== Flora and landscape ===
Thiranagama's environment consists of paddy fields, areas of jungle, palms, bamboo, mango trees and tropical vegetation.

== Government and economy ==
Located in the Southern Province of Sri Lanka, this area falls under two jurisdictions:

- the Hikkaduwa Divisional Secretariat (DS)
- the Hikkaduwa Urban Council.

In 2018, a significant tourism investment started shifting the local economy towards tourism. This was followed by the construction of the only two five-star hotels in the region of Hikkaduwa.

== Transport ==
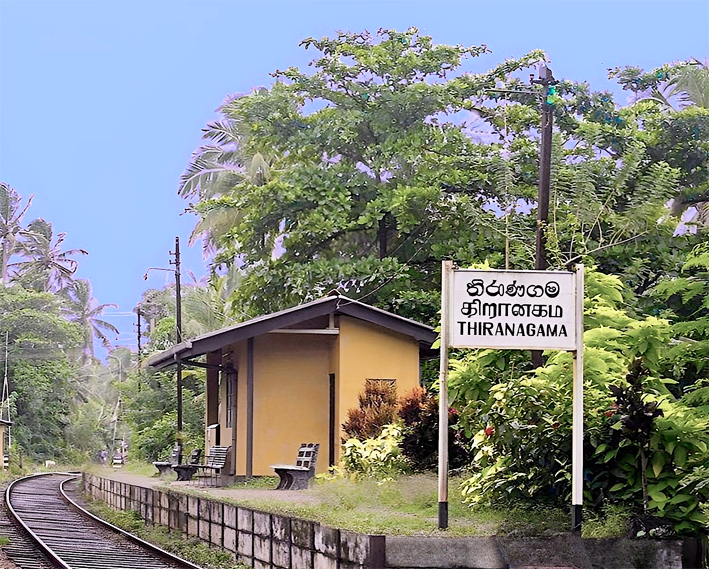
The railway station

The 43rd station of the Coastal Line is Thiranagama railway station.

The Coastal Line (or Southern line) links Colombo to Matara.

The station is located 97.8 km (60.8 mi) from Colombo station. Nine trains stop there daily.

Thiranagama is linked to the national road network by the A2 highway, connecting Colombo to Wellawaya.

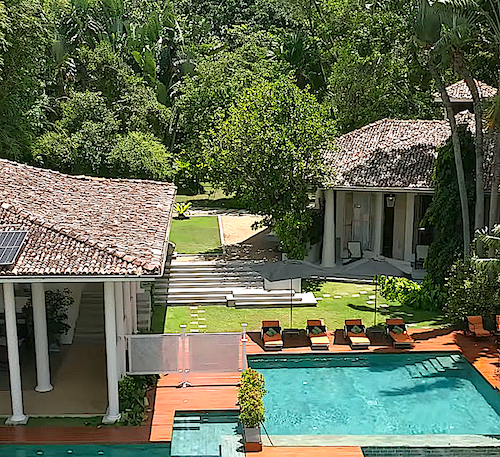
Aerial view of a villas resort

== Notable people ==
- Lasith Malinga, former cricketer, 2014 T20 World Cup-winning captain, studied at Thiranagama Maha Vidyalaya.
- Sir Arthur C. Clarke, science fiction writer, author of 2001: A Space Odyssey, owned a holiday villa in Thiranagama and established a diving station in the nearby town of Hikkaduwa.
