= Peraliya =

- Location in Sri Lanka
- Coordinates: 6°8′50″N 80°6′37″E
- Country: Sri Lanka
- Province: Southern Province
- District: Galle District

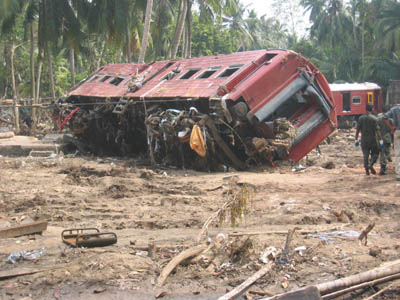
2004 Sri Lanka tsunami-rail disaster

Peraliya is a small coastal village situated in Hikkaduwa, Galle District in the Southern Province of Sri Lanka.

The village could be reached from Colombo in three hours; it is located around Temple Road off the 95 km mark of Galle Road.

The village was devastated by the tsunami at around 9.26 am on December 26, 2004 following the Indian Ocean earthquake. An express train from Colombo towards Galle swept away killing at least 1,700 passengers. The village had lost 500 of its people, and 200 have gone missing.

== See also ==
- 2004 Sri Lanka tsunami train wreck
- List of towns in Southern Province, Sri Lanka
