= Hikkaduwa National Park =

National Park in Sri Lanka

- IUCN category II (national park)
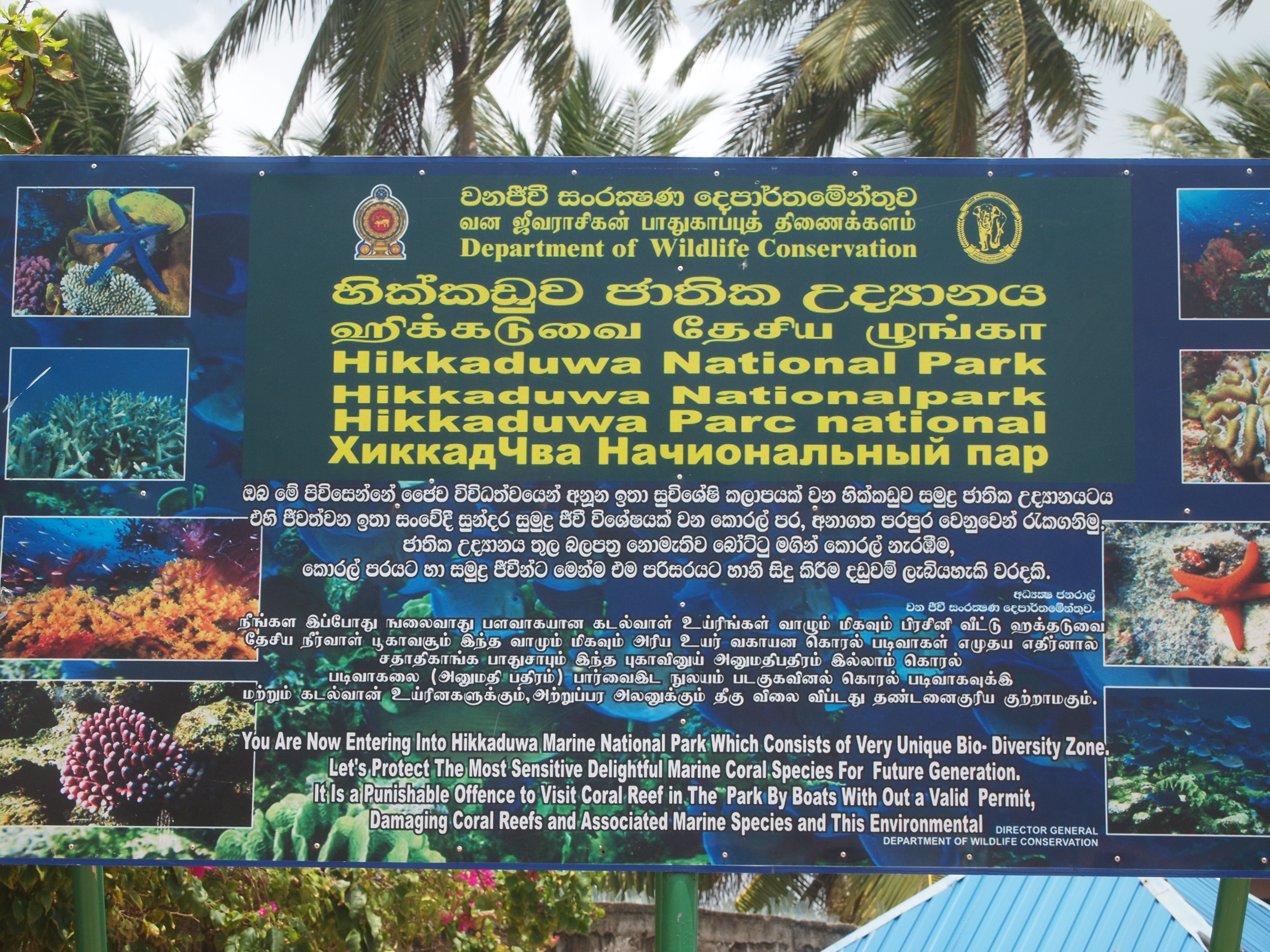
- Hikkaduwa National Park

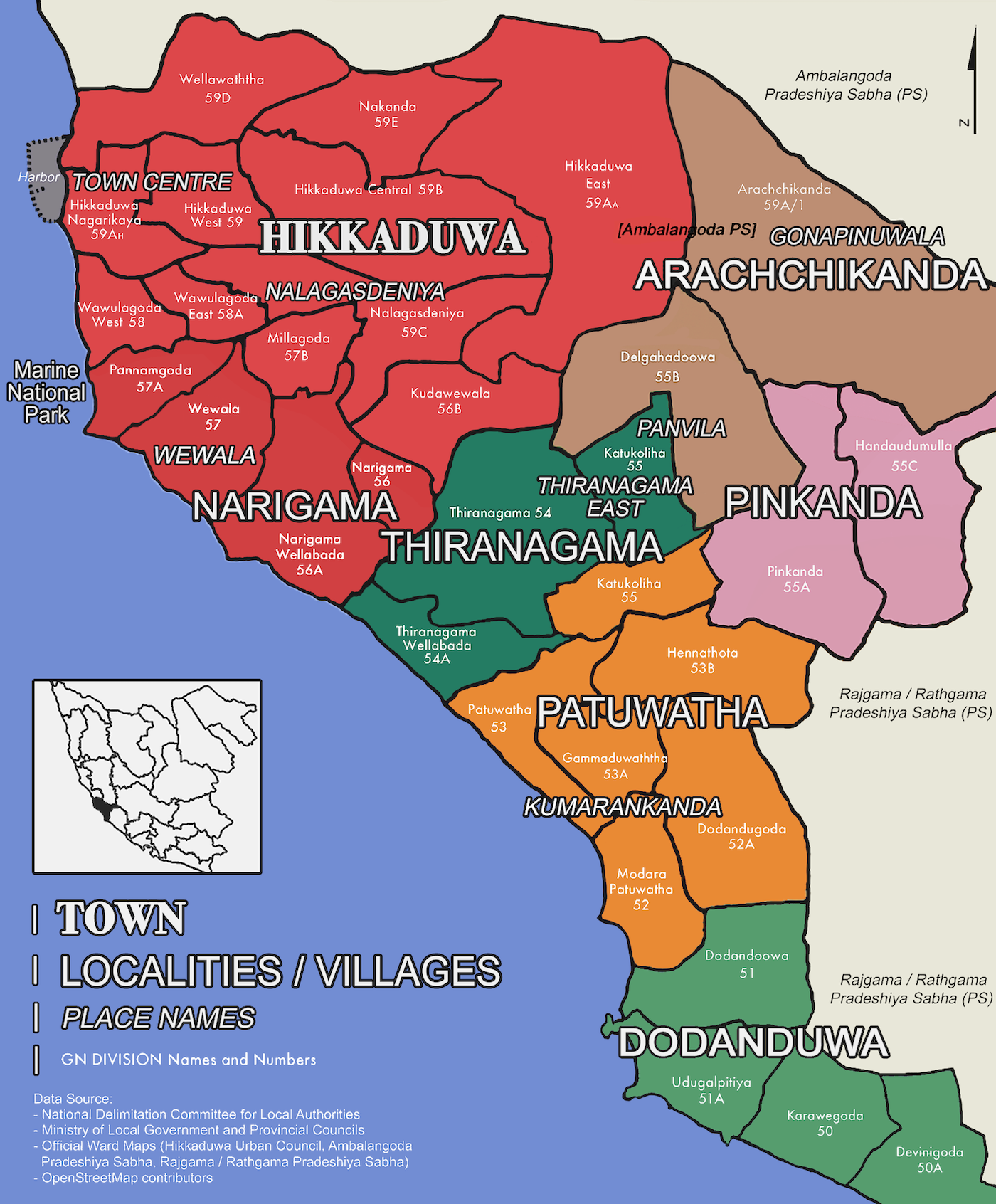
- Administrative map of Hikkaduwa region
- Location: Southern province, Sri Lanka
- Nearest city: Hikkaduwa
- Coordinates: 6°08′42″N 80°05′33″E
- Area: 101.6 ha (251 acres)
- Established: September 19, 2002; 23 years ago
- Governing body: Department of Wildlife Conservation

Hikkaduwa National Park is one of the three marine national parks in Sri Lanka. In 1979, it was declared a wildlife sanctuary, upgraded to a nature reserve in 1988, and then to a national park in 2002.

In 2023, the Wildlife Conservation Department steps into restore coral reefs in Hikkaduwa. In 2025, a fine was imposed on a man for coral damage.

== History ==
The area of Hikkaduwa National Park was declared a wildlife sanctuary on 18 May 1979, and then on 14 August 1988, upgraded to a nature reserve with extended land area.

The growth of the number of visitors in the next 25 years increased the degradation of the coral reef. To reduce the effects to the ecosystem, the reef was declared a national park on 19 September 2002.

In 2025, a man has been arrested, then fined for damaging corals at Hikkaduwa, with a court ordering the immediate restoration of the affected reef.

== Coral reef ==
Hikkaduwa coral reef is a typical shallow fringing reef with an average depth of around 5 metres (16 ft). The coral reef reduces the coastal erosion and forms a natural breakwater. The coast of the national park extends four km. Generally the coast is narrow, ranging from 5–50 m according to the climatic conditions of the year. Scuba diving is a popular recreation here.

== Physical features ==
The national park situated in the wet zone and receives a 2,000 millimetres (79 in) of annual rainfall. The rain is received in both southwestern and northeastern monsoon seasons, from April to June and September to November respectively. Inter-monsoon season is a dry period which is considered the best season to visit the park. The temperature of the water ranges from 28.0°-30.0 °C while the mean annual temperature is 27 °C of the atmosphere.

== Flora and fauna ==
Foliaceous Montipora species dominate the coral reef. Encrusting and branching species are also present. Faviidae and Poritidae corals are contained in the inshore areas of the reef in massive colonies. Staghorn, elkhorn, cabbage, brain, table and star corals are all present in the reef. Corals of 60 species belonging to 31 genera are recorded from the reef. The reef also recorded over 170 species of reef fish belonging to 76 genera.

Seagrass and marine algae belonging to genera Halimeda and Caulerpa are common in the seabed depth ranging from 5–10 m. Seagrasses provide habitat to dugongs and sea turtles. Some species of prawns feed on the seagrass. Eight species of ornamental fishes also inhabit the reef, along with many vertebrates and invertebrates including crabs, prawns, shrimps, oysters and sea worms. Porites desilveri is an endemic coral species of Sri Lanka. Chlorurus rhakoura and Pomacentrus proteus are two reef fish species confined to Sri Lanka. Blacktip reef shark are found along the outer slope of the reef. Three sea turtles which have been categorized threatened visit the coral reef: the hawksbill turtle, green turtle, and olive ridley.

== Threats ==
The reef has suffered high degradation due to both natural and human activities. The live coral cover was decreased from 47 percent to 13 percent in a coral bleaching event in 1998, induced by the 1998 El Niño. It has been suggested that at least 30-40 percent of coral reef should be restored in order for it to be capable of sustaining itself. Despite being designated as a protected area, the coral reef has been subject to constant exploitation including removal of breeding ornamental fish for the commercial market.

=== Boxing day tsunami ===
The two marine national parks of Sri Lanka, Hikkaduwa and Pigeon Island, received little direct impact from the Boxing day tsunami. However they suffered from secondary impacts, particularly from terrestrial debris being deposited on the reefs. A collaboration work of conservation groups and volunteers was carried out to clean up the beach and the reef debris, including two large fishing nets stuck on the outer edge of the reef.

== Coral types of Hikkaduwa ==
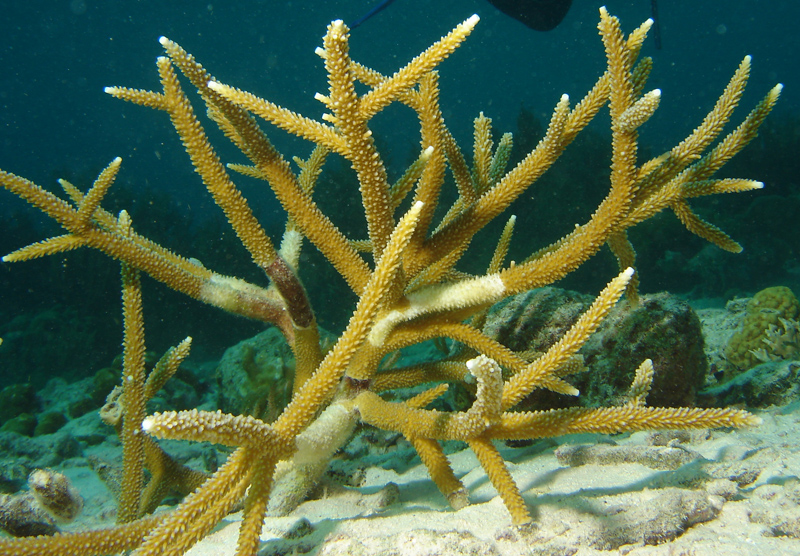
Staghorn coral

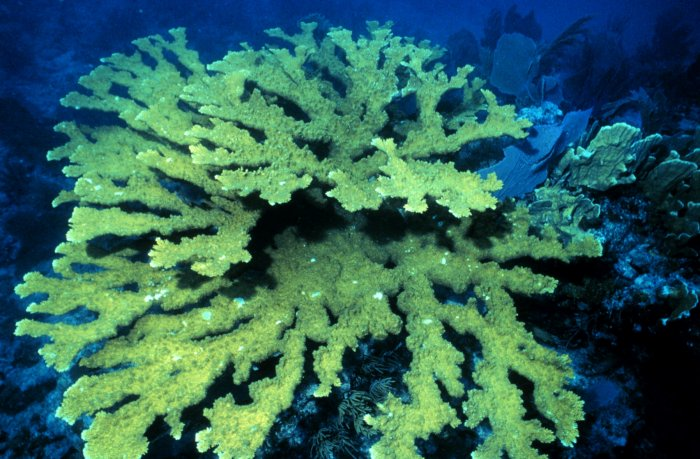
Elkhorn coral

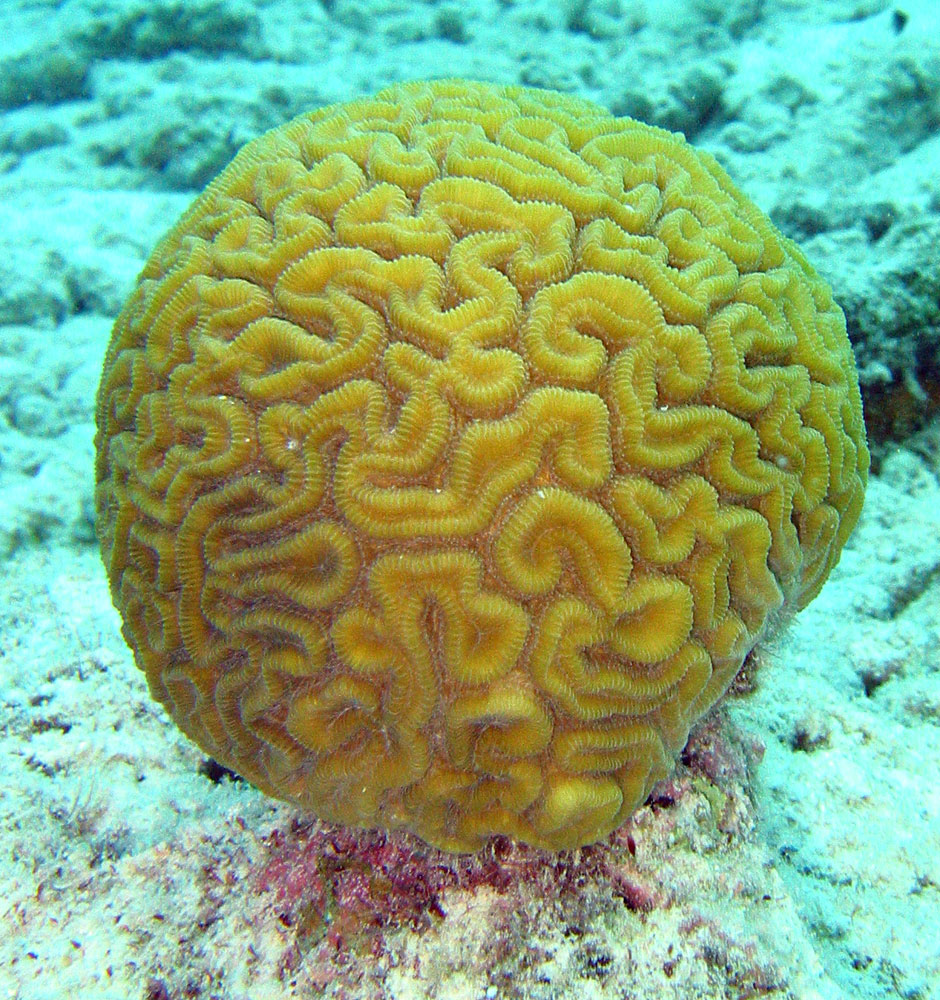
Brain coral

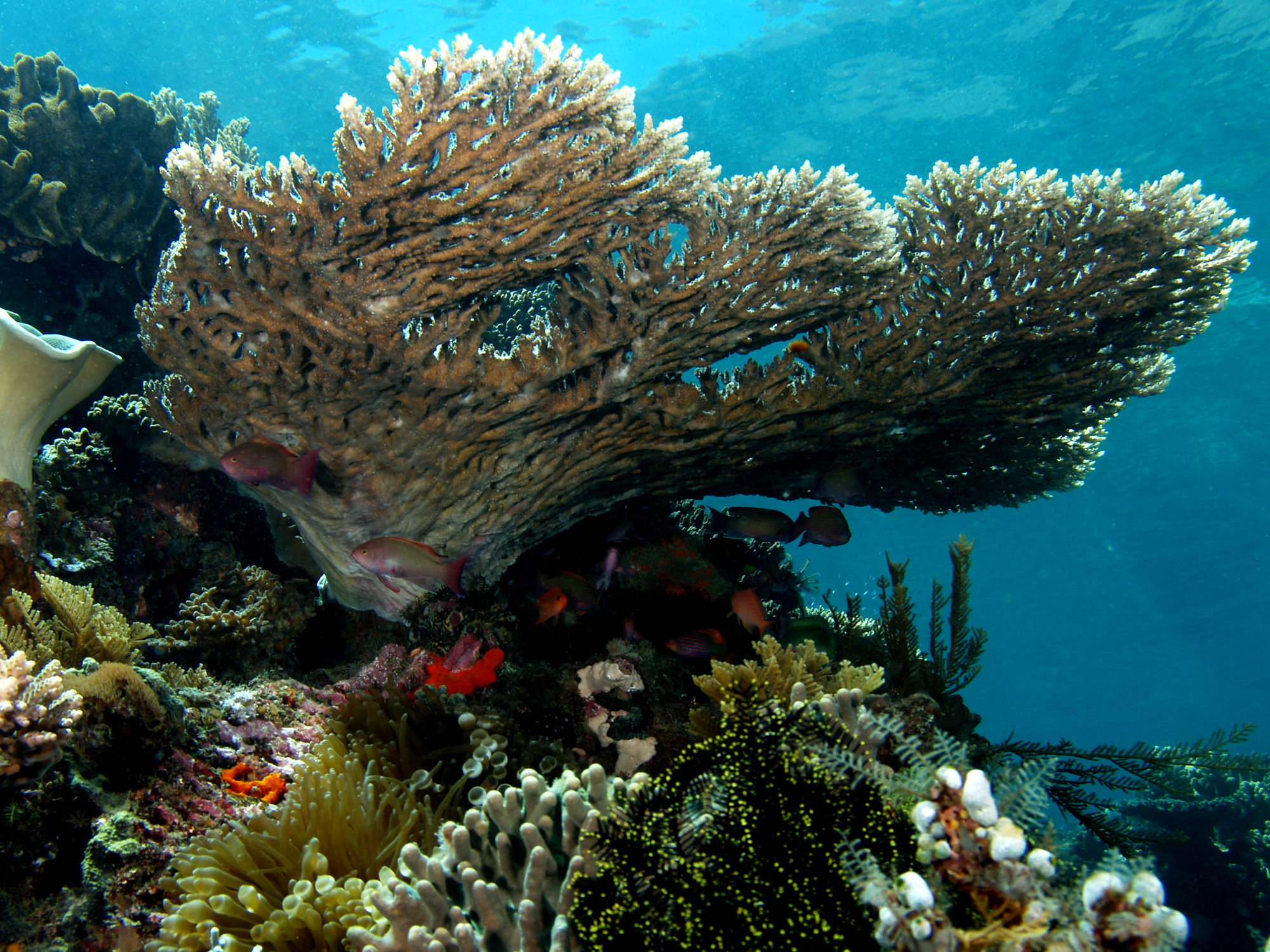
Table coral

== See also ==
- Protected areas of Sri Lanka
- Hikkaduwa
