= Wewala =

- Village
- Country: Sri Lanka
- Province: Western Province
- Time zone: UTC+5:30 (Sri Lanka Standard Time)

Wewala is a village in Sri Lanka. It is located within Western Province. It is a tourist area, that suffers from some of the difficulties of that, with a notable Catholic population.

== See also ==
- List of towns in Western Province, Sri Lanka
