= Outline of Sri Lanka =

Island country in the northern Indian Ocean

The Flag of Sri Lanka

The Emblem of Sri Lanka

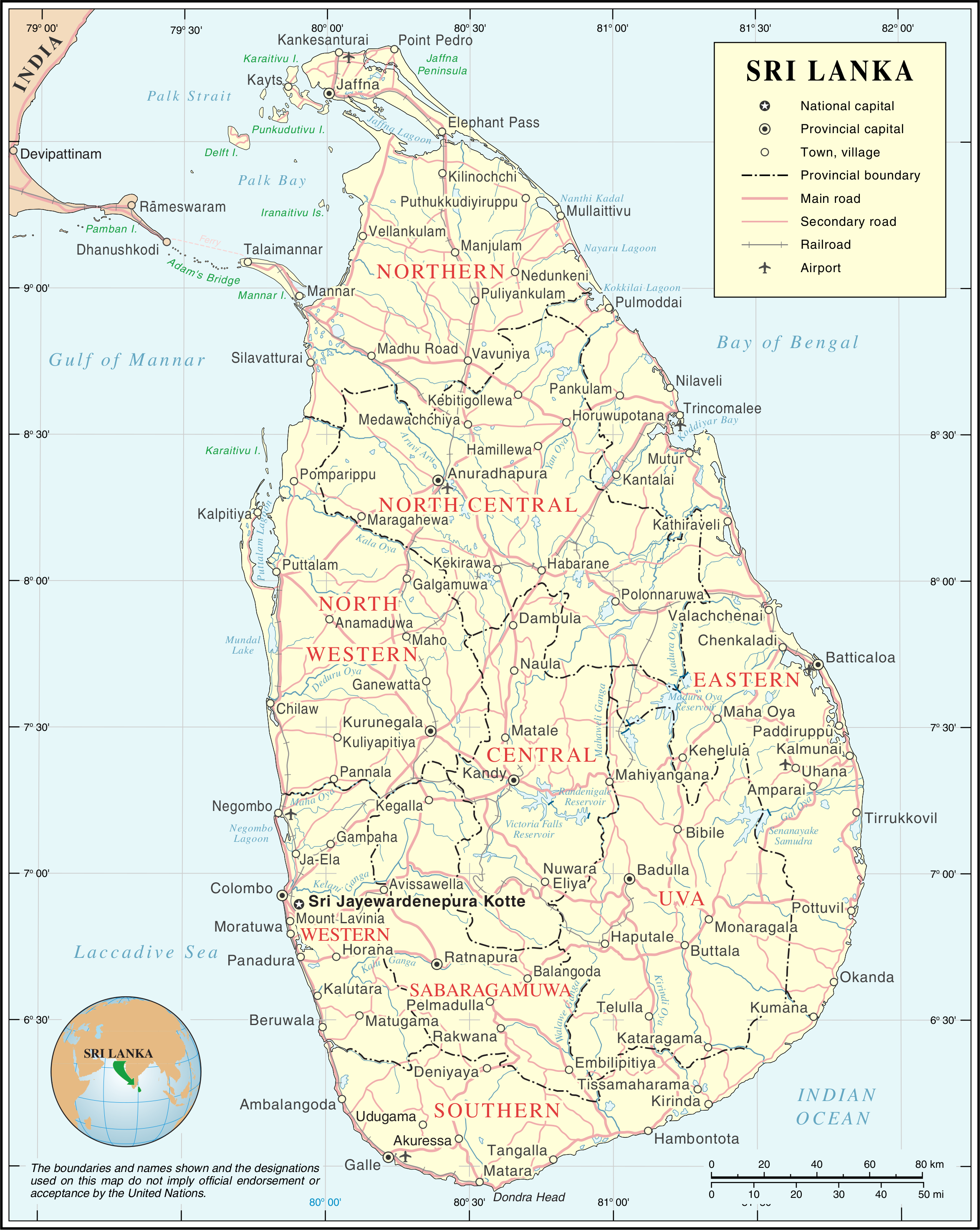
An enlargeable map of the Democratic Socialist Republic of Sri Lanka

The following outline is provided as an overview of and topical guide to Sri Lanka:

Sri Lanka – island country in the northern Indian Ocean off the southeast coast of the Indian subcontinent in South Asia. Known until 1972 as Ceylon (/sɨˈlɒnˌ seɪ-ˌ siː-/), Sri Lanka has maritime borders with India to the northwest and the Maldives to the southwest. Sri Lanka has a documented history that spans over 3,000 years, but there are theories to suggest that Sri Lanka had pre-historic human settlements dating back to at least 125,000 years. Its geographic location and deep harbours made it of great strategic importance from the time of the ancient Silk Road through to World War II. Sri Lanka is a republic and a unitary state governed by a presidential system. The capital, Sri Jayawardenepura Kotte, is a suburb of the largest city, Colombo. It is also an important producer of tea, coffee, gemstones, coconuts, rubber, and the native cinnamon, the island contains tropical forests and diverse landscapes with a high amount of biodiversity.

== General reference ==
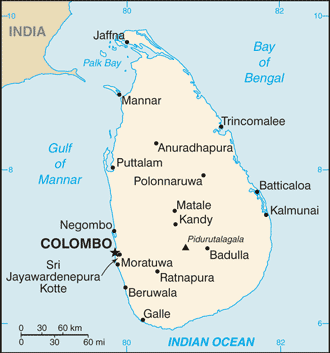
An enlargeable basic map of Sri Lanka

- Pronunciation:
- Common English country name: Sri Lanka, archaic Ceylon
- Official English country name: The Democratic Socialist Republic of Sri Lanka
- Adjective: Sri Lankan
- Demonym(s):
- Etymology: Name of Sri Lanka
- ISO country codes: LK, LKA, 144
- ISO region codes: See ISO 3166-2:LK
- Internet country code top-level domain: .lk

== Geography of Sri Lanka ==
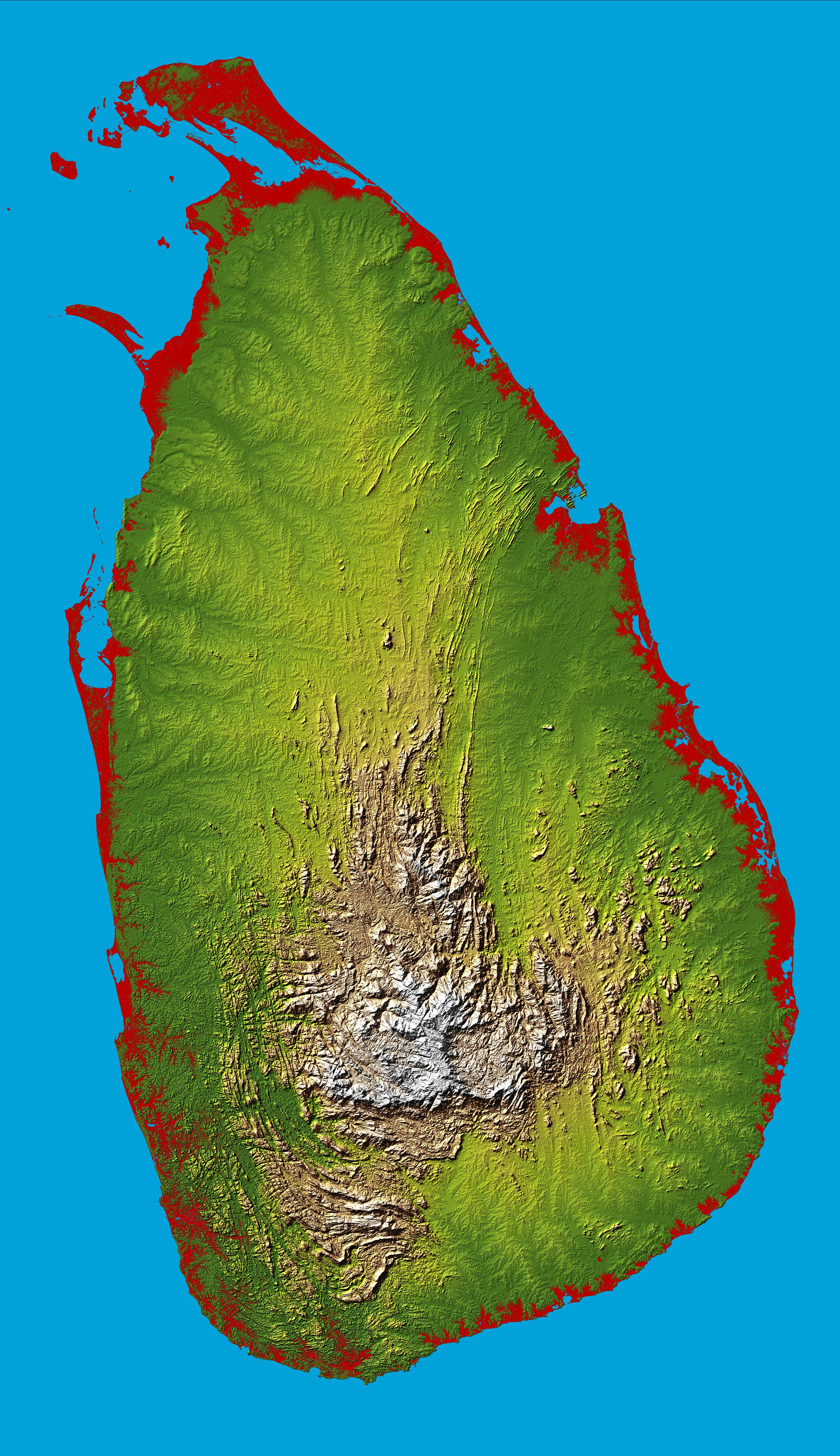
An enlargeable topographic map of Sri Lanka

Geography of Sri Lanka

- Sri Lanka is: an island country
- Location:
  - Northern Hemisphere and Eastern Hemisphere
  - Indian Ocean
    - between the Laccadive Sea and the Bay of Bengal
  - Eurasia
    - Asia
      - South Asia
        - Indian subcontinent (off the coast of India, on the same continental shelf)
  - Time zone: Sri Lanka Time (UTC+05:30)
  - Extreme points of Sri Lanka
    - High: Pidurutalagala 2,524 m (8,281 ft)
    - Low: Indian Ocean 0 m
  - Land boundaries: none
  - Coastline: Indian Ocean 1,340 km
- Population: 20,277,597 (2012) - 57th most populous country
- Area: 65,610 km^{2}
- Atlas of Sri Lanka

=== Environment of Sri Lanka ===
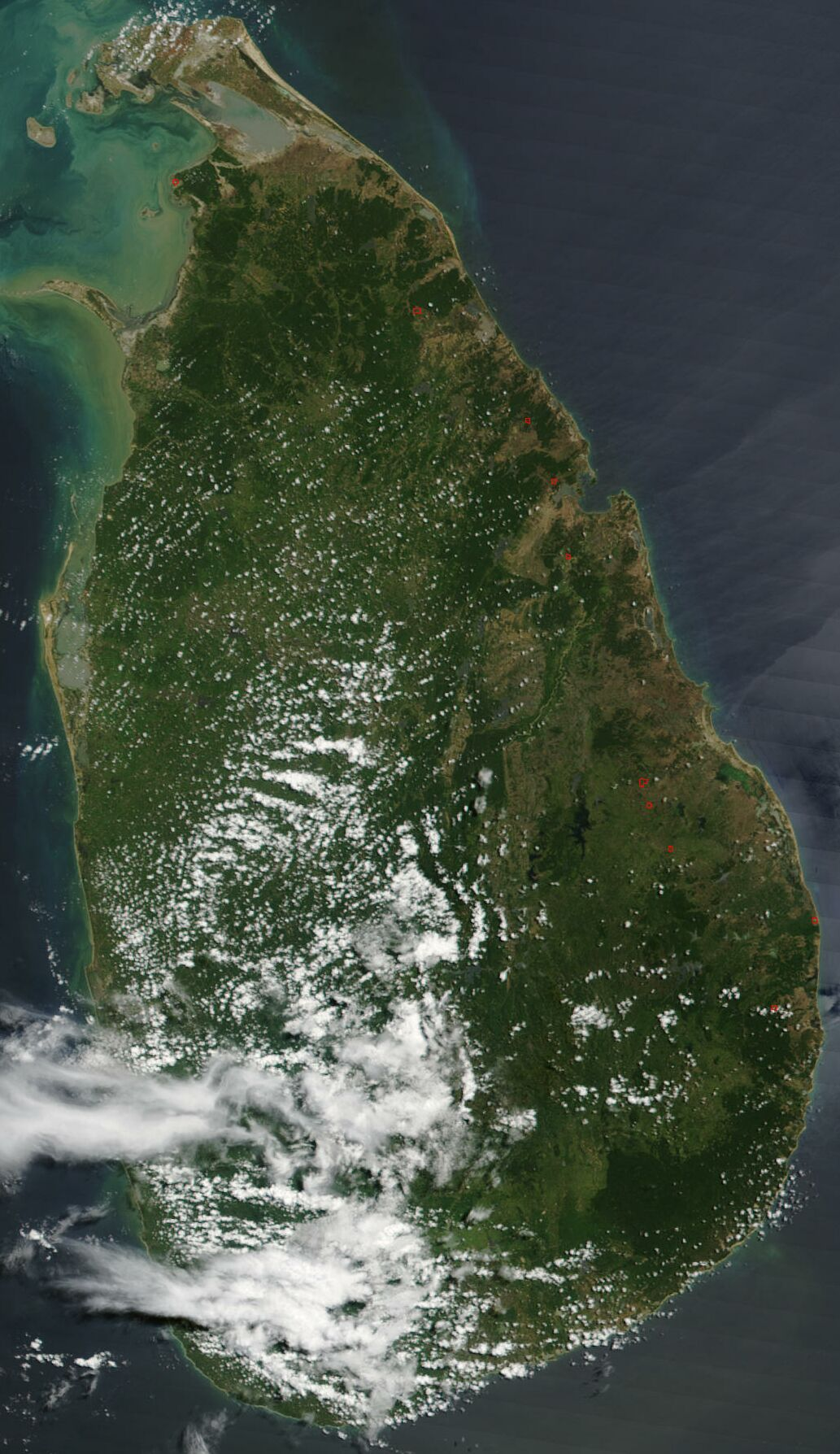
An enlargeable satellite image of Sri Lanka

Environment of Sri Lanka

- Climate of Sri Lanka
- Environmental issues in Sri Lanka
- Ecoregions in Sri Lanka
- Renewable energy in Sri Lanka
- Protected areas of Sri Lanka
  - Biosphere reserves in Sri Lanka
  - National parks of Sri Lanka
- Wildlife of Sri Lanka(Flora & Fauna)
  - Birds of Sri Lanka
  - Mammals of Sri Lanka

==== Natural geographic features of Sri Lanka ====
- Beaches in Sri Lanka
- Islands in Sri Lanka
- Mountains in Sri Lanka
- Rivers in Sri Lanka
  - Waterfalls in Sri Lanka
- List of World Heritage Sites in Sri Lanka

=== Regions of Sri Lanka ===
==== Ecoregions of Sri Lanka ====
List of ecoregions in Sri Lanka

- Ecoregions in Sri Lanka

==== Administrative divisions of Sri Lanka ====
Administrative divisions of Sri Lanka

- Provinces of Sri Lanka
  - Districts of Sri Lanka

===== Provinces of Sri Lanka =====
Provinces of Sri Lanka

- Central Province
- Eastern Province
- North Central Province
- Northern Province
- North Western Province
- Sabaragamuwa Province
- Southern Province
- Uva Province
- Western Province

===== Districts of Sri Lanka =====
Districts of Sri Lanka

- Kandy District
- Matale District
- Nuwara Eliya District
- Ampara District
- Batticaloa District
- Trincomalee District
- Anuradhapura District
- Polonnaruwa District
- Jaffna District
- Kilinochchi District
- Mannar District
- Mullaitivu District
- Vavuniya District
- Kurunegala District
- Puttalam District
- Kegalle District
- Ratnapura District
- Galle District
- Hambantota District
- Matara District
- Badulla District
- Moneragala District
- Colombo District
- Gampaha District
- Kalutara District

=== Demography of Sri Lanka ===
Demographics of Sri Lanka

== Government and politics of Sri Lanka ==
Politics of Sri Lanka

- Form of government:
- Capital of Sri Lanka: Sri Jayawardenepura Kotte (shortened:Kotte)
- Elections in Sri Lanka
- Political parties in Sri Lanka

=== Branches of the government of Sri Lanka ===
Government of Sri Lanka

==== Executive branch of the government of Sri Lanka ====
- Head of state: President of Sri Lanka,
- Head of government: Prime Minister of Sri Lanka,
- Cabinet of Sri Lanka

==== Legislative branch of the government of Sri Lanka ====
- Parliament of Sri Lanka (Unicameral)

==== Judicial branch of the government of Sri Lanka ====
Court system of Sri Lanka

- Supreme Court of Sri Lanka

=== Foreign relations of Sri Lanka ===
Foreign relations of Sri Lanka

- Diplomatic missions in Sri Lanka
- Diplomatic missions of Sri Lanka

==== International organization membership ====
The Democratic Socialist Republic of Sri Lanka is a member of:

- Asian Development Bank (ADB)
- Bay of Bengal Initiative for Multi-Sectoral Technical and Economic Cooperation (BIMSTEC)
- Colombo Plan (CP)
- Commonwealth of Nations
- Food and Agriculture Organization (FAO)
- Group of 15 (G15)
- Group of 24 (G24)
- Group of 77 (G77)
- International Atomic Energy Agency (IAEA)
- International Bank for Reconstruction and Development (IBRD)
- International Chamber of Commerce (ICC)
- International Civil Aviation Organization (ICAO)
- International Criminal Police Organization (Interpol)
- International Development Association (IDA)
- International Federation of Red Cross and Red Crescent Societies (IFRCS)
- International Finance Corporation (IFC)
- International Fund for Agricultural Development (IFAD)
- International Hydrographic Organization (IHO)
- International Labour Organization (ILO)
- International Maritime Organization (IMO)
- International Mobile Satellite Organization (IMSO)
- International Monetary Fund (IMF)
- International Olympic Committee (IOC)
- International Organization for Migration (IOM)
- International Organization for Standardization (ISO)
- International Red Cross and Red Crescent Movement (ICRM)
- International Telecommunication Union (ITU)
- International Telecommunications Satellite Organization (ITSO)
- International Trade Union Confederation (ITUC)
- Inter-Parliamentary Union (IPU)
- Multilateral Investment Guarantee Agency (MIGA)
- Nonaligned Movement (NAM)
- Organisation for the Prohibition of Chemical Weapons (OPCW)
- Organization of American States (OAS) (observer)
- Permanent Court of Arbitration (PCA)
- South Asia Co-operative Environment Programme (SACEP)
- South Asian Association for Regional Cooperation (SAARC)
- United Nations (UN)
- United Nations Conference on Trade and Development (UNCTAD)
- United Nations Educational, Scientific, and Cultural Organization (UNESCO)
- United Nations Industrial Development Organization (UNIDO)
- United Nations Mission for the Referendum in Western Sahara (MINURSO)
- United Nations Mission in the Sudan (UNMIS)
- United Nations Organization Mission in the Democratic Republic of the Congo (MONUC)
- United Nations Stabilization Mission in Haiti (MINUSTAH)
- Universal Postal Union (UPU)
- World Confederation of Labour (WCL)
- World Customs Organization (WCO)
- World Federation of Trade Unions (WFTU)
- World Health Organization (WHO)
- World Intellectual Property Organization (WIPO)
- World Meteorological Organization (WMO)
- World Tourism Organization (UNWTO)
- World Trade Organization (WTO)

=== Law and order in Sri Lanka ===
Law of Sri Lanka

- Capital punishment in Sri Lanka
- Constitution of Sri Lanka
- Crime in Sri Lanka
- Human rights in Sri Lanka
  - LGBT rights in Sri Lanka
  - Freedom of religion in Sri Lanka
- Law enforcement in Sri Lanka

=== Military of Sri Lanka ===
Military of Sri Lanka

- Command
  - Commander-in-chief: President of Sri Lanka
    - Ministry of Defence of Sri Lanka
- Forces
  - Army of Sri Lanka
  - Navy of Sri Lanka
  - Air Force of Sri Lanka

=== Local government in Sri Lanka ===
Local government in Sri Lanka

== History of Sri Lanka ==
History of Sri Lanka

- Koon Karava
- Timeline of the history of Sri Lanka

== Culture of Sri Lanka ==
Culture of Sri Lanka

- Architecture in Sri Lanka
  - Architecture of ancient Sri Lanka
  - List of Sri Lankan architects
  - Forts of Sri Lanka
- Cuisine of Sri Lanka
- Festivals in Sri Lanka
- Languages of Sri Lanka
- Media in Sri Lanka
- National symbols of Sri Lanka
  - Coat of arms of Sri Lanka
  - Flag of Sri Lanka
  - National anthem of Sri Lanka
- Prostitution in Sri Lanka
- Public holidays in Sri Lanka
- Religion in Sri Lanka
  - Buddhism in Sri Lanka
    - Amarapura–Rāmañña Nikāya
    - Siam Nikaya
    - Sri Lankan Forest Tradition
  - Christianity in Sri Lanka
  - Hinduism in Sri Lanka
  - Islam in Sri Lanka
- List of World Heritage Sites in Sri Lanka

=== Art in Sri Lanka ===
- Cinema of Sri Lanka
- Literature of Sri Lanka
- Music of Sri Lanka
- Television in Sri Lanka
- Theatre in Sri Lanka

=== Sports in Sri Lanka ===
Sports in Sri Lanka

- Cricket in Sri Lanka
- Football in Sri Lanka
- Netball in Sri Lanka
- Rugby union in Sri Lanka
- Sri Lanka at the Olympics
- Sri Lanka at the Asian Games
- Sri Lanka at the Commonwealth Games

== Economy and infrastructure of Sri Lanka ==
Economy of Sri Lanka

- Economic rank, by nominal GDP (2007): 80th (eightieth)
- Agriculture in Sri Lanka
- Banking in Sri Lanka
  - Central Bank of Sri Lanka
- Communications in Sri Lanka
  - Internet in Sri Lanka
- Companies of Sri Lanka
- Currency of Sri Lanka: Rupee
  - ISO 4217: LKR
- Energy in Sri Lanka
  - Ministry of Power and Energy
  - List of power stations in Sri Lanka
- Sri Lanka Stock Exchange
- Tourism in Sri Lanka
- Transport in Sri Lanka
  - Airports in Sri Lanka
  - Sri Lanka Railways

== Education in Sri Lanka ==
Education in Sri Lanka

- Pirivena, centres of monastic education

== Health in Sri Lanka ==
Health in Sri Lanka

- Health care in Sri Lanka

== See also ==
- Sri Lanka
- List of international rankings
- Member state of the Commonwealth of Nations
- Member state of the United Nations
- American Chamber of Commerce in Sri Lanka
- Outline of Asia
- Outline of geography
