= Southwestern Sri Lanka rivers and streams =

Ecological region

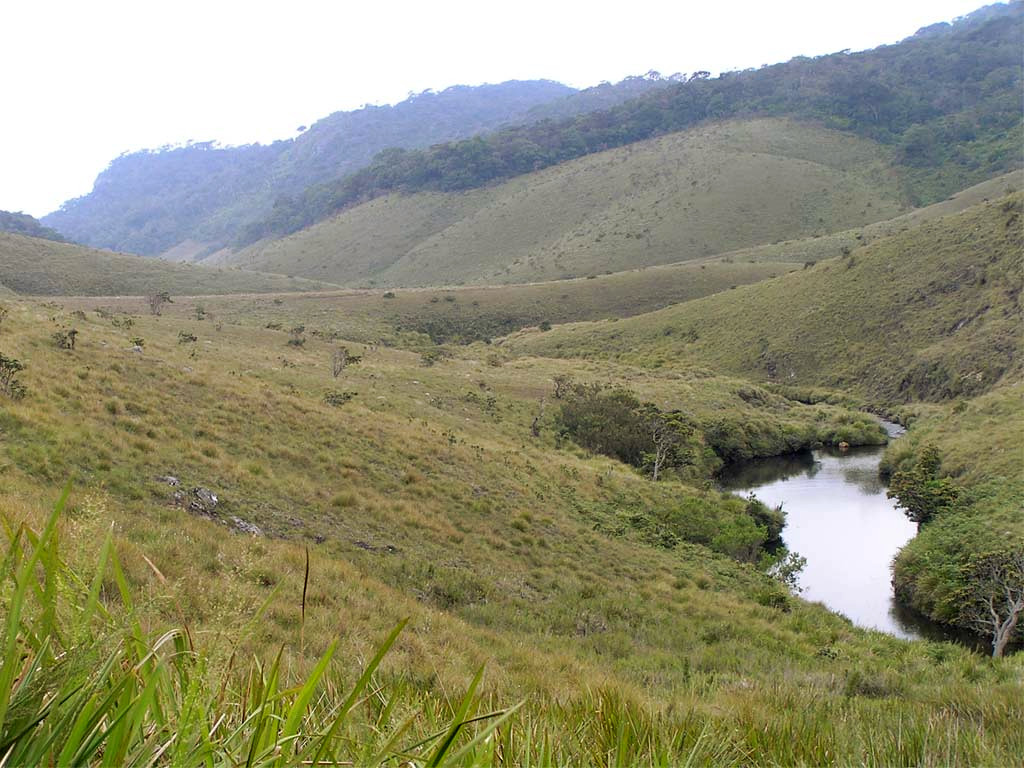
Streams in the Horton Plains National Park, one of the few protected areas of this ecoregion

Southwestern Sri Lanka rivers and streams is a freshwater ecoregion in Sri Lanka. The ecoregion is listed in Global 200, a list of ecoregions compiled by the World Wide Fund for Nature for conservation priorities. The extensive network of rivers and streams of Sri Lanka drains a total of 103 distinct natural river basins. Several waterfall habitats have been formed as a result of rivers and streams flowing through high and mid elevation areas. The ecoregion spreads over 15,500 km^{2} in the wet zone of the southwestern part of Sri Lanka. More than a quarter of the freshwater fishes that have been discovered in Southwestern Sri Lanka rivers and streams are endemic. Nine endemic genera of freshwater fishes of Western Ghats and Sri Lanka hotspot Malpulutta are found only in Sri Lanka. Studies suggest that the number of species still to be discovered is quite high. Until recently wetlands in Sri Lanka were used for drainage, construction sites and land fills.

== Biodiversity ==
Diverse types of plants, fish and mussels are supported by rivers and streams that flow through this region, sourced in the central highlands. Sri Lanka harbors 90 species of freshwater fish and 21 species of crabs. Twenty six species of fish are confined to this ecoregion. As unraveling of new species is continuing, the number of endemics is expected to rise greatly. Most of these fishes are small and specialized to their rivers and streams. Some of the fish species inhabiting this ecoregion include Two Spot Barb, Black ruby barb, Cherry barb and Black-lined Barb. More rare species in this ecoregion include Spotted Loach, Ornate paradisefish, Rasbora wilpita, Puntius martenstyni and Pearly rasbora. Many of the fishes of this ecoregion have commercial value and are harvested in fisheries and traded for aquariums. Apart from fishes, this ecoregion is also rich with crocodiles, turtles and amphibians.

== Human impact ==
Forests in this ecoregion are cleared for tea and rubber plantations. Poaching and the extraction of timber are problems even in protected areas, resulting in habitat fragmentation and edge effects. Farmers have changed some of the slow moving waterways into rice fields. Black ruby barb and Cherry barb populations are being reduced due to the ornamental fish trade. Competition with introduced alien fish and plants poses a threat to native species. Using agrochemicals unrestrictedly poses a different threat to the ecosystem and to species groups such as amphibians. Rainbow trout, Clown knifefish, Walking catfish and Red-eared slider are some of the invasive species causing direct exploitation or destruction. There is some protection in place for central highland water courses in the Peak Wilderness Sanctuary and Horton Plains National Park.

== See also ==
- List of ecoregions in Sri Lanka
- List of freshwater ecoregions (WWF)
