= Suwa Seriya Ambulance Service =

Ambulance service

- Type: Nonprofit organization
- Established: 2016
- Region served: Sri Lanka
- Area size: 25,330 square miles (65,600 km^{2})
- Population: 20.28 million
- Chair: A. M. N. Rathnayake
- Chief executive: Suneth Fernando
- Staff: 1,400 (2020/21)
- Website: http://www.1990.lk/

The Suwa Seriya Foundation (Suwa Seriya Ambulance Service or 1990 Ambulance Service) is a nonprofit organization responsible for operating ambulances with Emergency medical technicians and answering and responding to urgent and emergency medical situations within all nine provinces of Sri Lanka. The service responds to 1990 phone calls across the island and provides free services.

== History ==
=== Founding ===
In 2016, the foundation was established with a $7.56 million grant from the Government of India, following a request from the Government of Sri Lanka based on a proposal made by then Prime Minister Ranil Wickremesinghe and then Deputy Minister Harsha de Silva for a pre-hospital emergency ambulance service, which Sri Lanka lacked at the time. The initial grant allowed the ambulance service start its service in the Western and Southern Provinces with a fleet of 88 ambulances. The first EMTs were trained by GVK EMRI which transferred the knowledge to create the service. In the next few years, the service was expanded to all nine provinces of the island with a fleet of 297 ambulances. The ambulances were purchased from Tata Motors with an additional grant from India worth $15.09 million.

During its founding it was opposed by former president Mahinda Rajapaksa, Wimal Weeranwansa and the Government Medical Officers Association. As the GMOA which had become politically partisan during the period refused to allow the ambulances to be parked in Hospitals forcing them to be parked in Police Stations instead. The GMOA later abandoned its opposition to the service but ambulances continue to be stationed at police stations as the strategic placement based on population density allows faster deployment speeds and to cover a larger area.

=== COVID-19 Pandemic ===
The service became essential during Sri Lanka's response to the COVID-19 pandemic as emergencies increased, and the service became instrumental in transporting COVID patients with comorbodities. World Bank’s Vice President for the South Asia Region, Martin Raiser praised the service for its innovation, integrating advanced technologies such as artificial intelligence into logistics management and being a government agency with the agility and independence of a private sector organization. During the pandemic the service transported 175,000 COVID-19 patients to hospitals.

During the pandemic, the service was further expanded with financing from Japan and the Asian Development Bank.

=== 2022 Economic Crisis ===
The service was affected by the 2022 Sri Lankan economic crisis as the government failed to provide adequate funds to continue the service. This resulted in a Rs.1.5 billion shortfall and the maintenance of the service became unsustainable for the year of 2023. Suwa Seriya foundation launched an ‘Adopt an Ambulance’ initiative with the facilitation of the Ceylon Chamber of Commerce, which resulted in large corporate donations. In addition, fundraisers were done collecting donations from the public.

Despite the crisis resulting in reduced funding and struggles in staff retention due to increased emigration, the service survived, and by October 2024 it had transported a total of 2 million patients since its inception.

== Operations ==
Emergency Command and Control Centre (ECCC) controls the operations digitally through an integrated system that coordinates with existing Emergency Dispatch Management system and the rest of the Operations Management systems and emergency medical technicians.

The service extensively uses Artificial Intelligence and Mixed-reality to increase speed and efficiency. Algorithms identify the fastest ambulance that can be deployed to an emergency rather than the nearest, while the patient's location could be tracked by an app and the control center digitally tracks fuel levels in the ambulances. The service uses Microsoft HoloLens and the Mediwave’s Emergency Response Suite to allow EMTs to remotely connect with the Emergency Physician at the ECCC, monitor vital signs, and provide specialized care even on the road to the hospital.

== See also ==
- Emergency medical services in Sri Lanka
- Fire services in Sri Lanka
- Emergency medical services
- Health care in Sri Lanka
