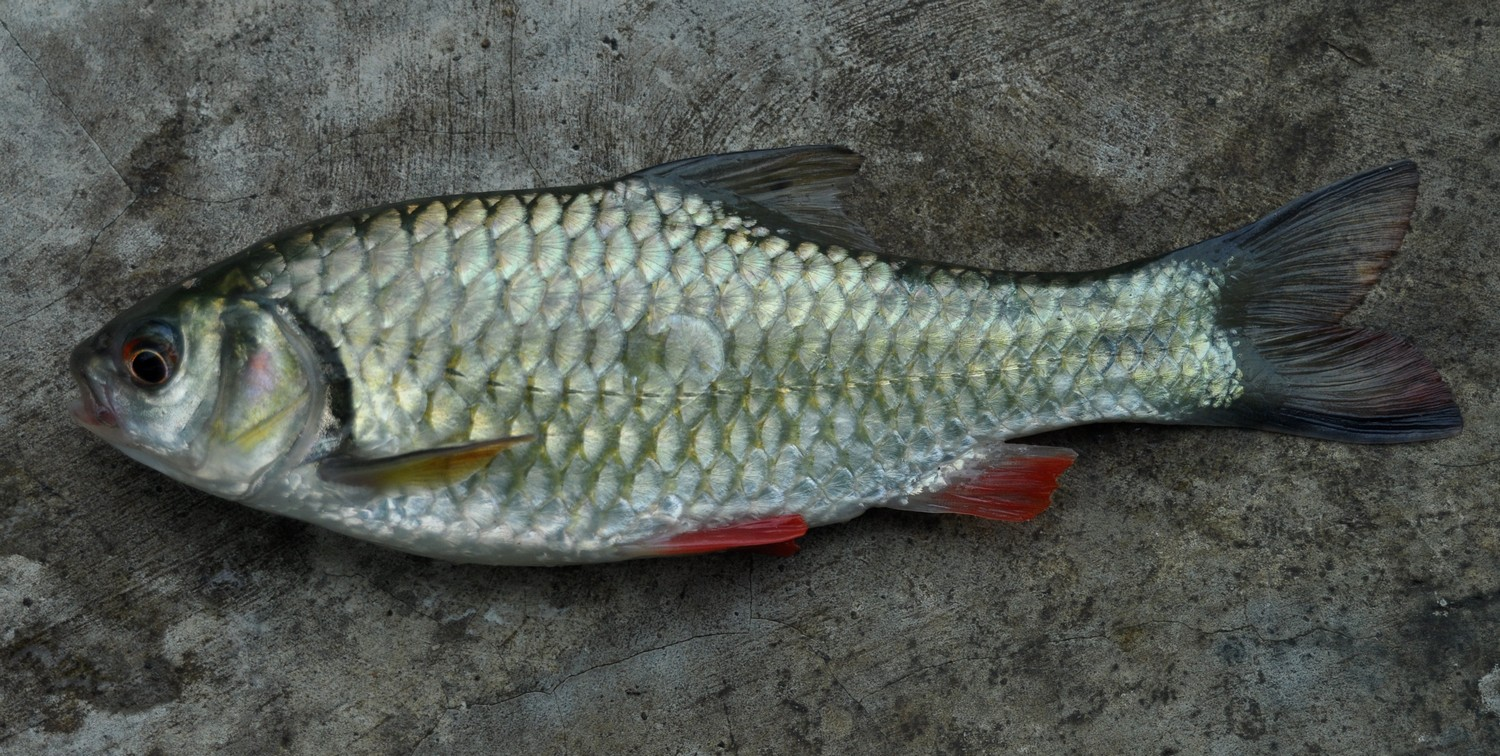

Scientific classification
- Domain: Eukaryota
- Kingdom: Animalia
- Phylum: Chordata
- Class: Actinopterygii
- Order: Cypriniformes
- Family: Cyprinidae
- Genus: Systomus
- Species: S. orphoides

Binomial name
- Systomus orphoides (Valenciennes, 1842)

Synonyms
- Barbodes sarana orphoides (Valenciennes, 1842); Barbus orphoides Valenciennes, 1842; Puntius orphoides (Valenciennes, 1842); Puntius sarana orphoides (Valenciennes, 1842)

= Systomus orphoides =

Species of fish

Systomus orphoides, is a species of cyprinid fish native to Southeast Asia. It can reach a length of 21 centimetres (8.3 in) SL. It is closely related to, and maybe a synonym of, Systomus rubripinnis.

== Sexual dimorphism ==
Adult males develop a more intense colour pattern than females and develop nuptial tubercles on the head in spawning condition.

Adult females tend to grow a little larger, are heavier-bodied, and less colourful.

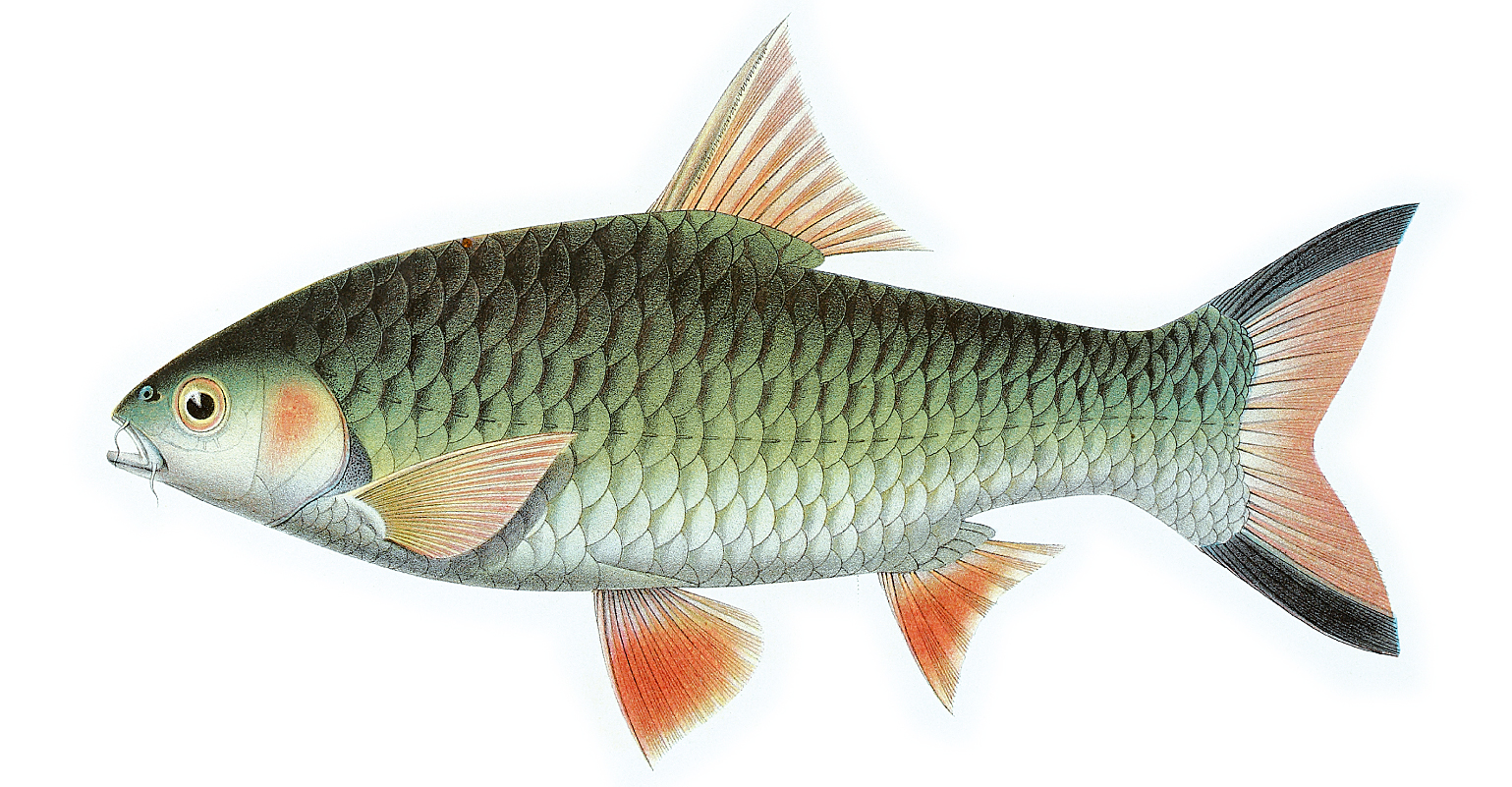
ID plate according to Bleeker
