= Emergency medical services in Sri Lanka =

Emergency Medical Services (EMS) in Sri Lanka is provided via a public–private partnership model that provides emergency ambulance response, prehospital medical care, and patient transport across the country. The system has evolved since the early 2000s from fragmented volunteer and hospital-based initiatives to a nationwide 24-hour emergency medical response network. Major milestones include the 1-1-0 and 1-9-9-0 ambulance systems, the introduction of national EMT training standards, and the launch of the Suwa Seriya Foundation in 2016, which today operates under the emergency number 1990 and delivers free emergency care throughout Sri Lanka.

== History ==
=== Early development (2003–2004) ===
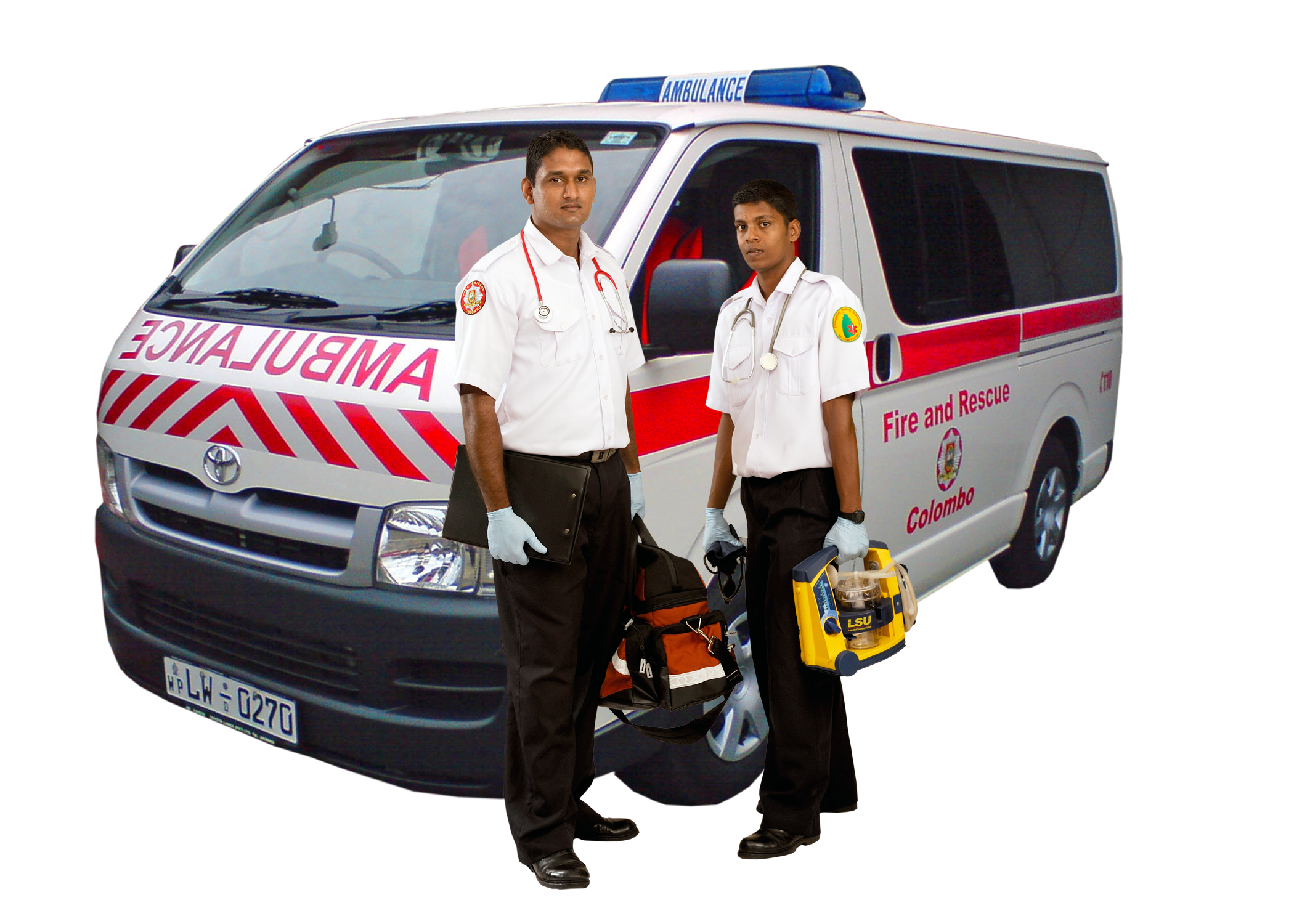
An ambulance of the Colombo Fire Brigade, 2006

Efforts to create a coordinated EMS system began in 2003 through collaboration among government agencies, the National Hospital of Sri Lanka, and SweRoad, a Swedish National Road Administration company. Prior to this, ambulance operations were managed independently by private hospitals, the Sri Lanka Red Cross Society, and St. John Ambulance without central coordination. The Colombo Municipal Council acquired ambulances and trained firefighters as EMTs, introducing the three-digit emergency number 1-1-0 in November 2004. This pilot was interrupted by the December 2004 Indian Ocean tsunami, which caused over 30,000 deaths.

=== Post-tsunami reconstruction (2005–2009) ===
Following the tsunami, the Ministry of Healthcare and Nutrition established a Pre-Hospital Care Committee under its Trauma Secretariat to guide EMS development. In 2005, support from Johanniter International of Germany enabled renewed operations using the 1-1-0 number. Medical Teams International (MTI), a U.S. humanitarian organization, entered Sri Lanka in 2005 to assist with prehospital system design and EMT training. Between 2005 and 2010, MTI trained approximately 2,700 EMTs in nine districts and developed standardized protocols in partnership with the Ministry of Health. During this period, MTI's Director Donnie Woodyard, Jr. served on the Ministry of Health Trauma Secretariat as an EMS Policy Advisor and oversaw development of the first EMT textbook in the Sinhala and Tamil languages.

Published in 2008, this was the first Emergency Medical Technician textbook written in Tamil, developed in Sri Lanka to align with United States EMT standards and ILCOR evidence-based guidelines.

Published in 2008, this was the first Emergency Medical Technician textbook written in Sinhala, developed in Sri Lanka to align with United States EMT standards and ILCOR evidence-based guidelines

In parallel with these efforts, the Government of the Netherlands supported a large-scale EMS infrastructure project through its Ministry of Foreign Affairs’ Development-Related Export Transactions (ORET) program. In 2007, the Dutch company SAR Systems and the International Centre for Emergency Techniques (ICET) delivered 115 ambulances and fire engines to Sri Lanka, along with training and maintenance support. The project included the donation of emergency equipment, the establishment of a firefighter and rescue training center, and capacity-building initiatives across multiple districts.

=== Regional development: the Jaffna system ===
In Jaffna District, local health authorities developed a nighttime ambulance service during the final years of the Sri Lankan civil conflict. With curfew restrictions preventing civilian travel after 6 p.m., the Regional Department of Health Services (RDHS) partnered with St. John Ambulance and the Red Cross to operate emergency vehicles during curfew hours. The model expanded into a 24-hour system, coordinated by Medical Teams International, with EMT training by MTI. The system was officially inaugurated on February 11, 2009, with U.S. support. By the end of its first year, the Jaffna system had responded to over 2,000 ambulance calls, trained nearly 600 EMTs, and achieved operational self-sufficiency with minimal subsidy.

=== Private sector involvement (2011–2015) ===
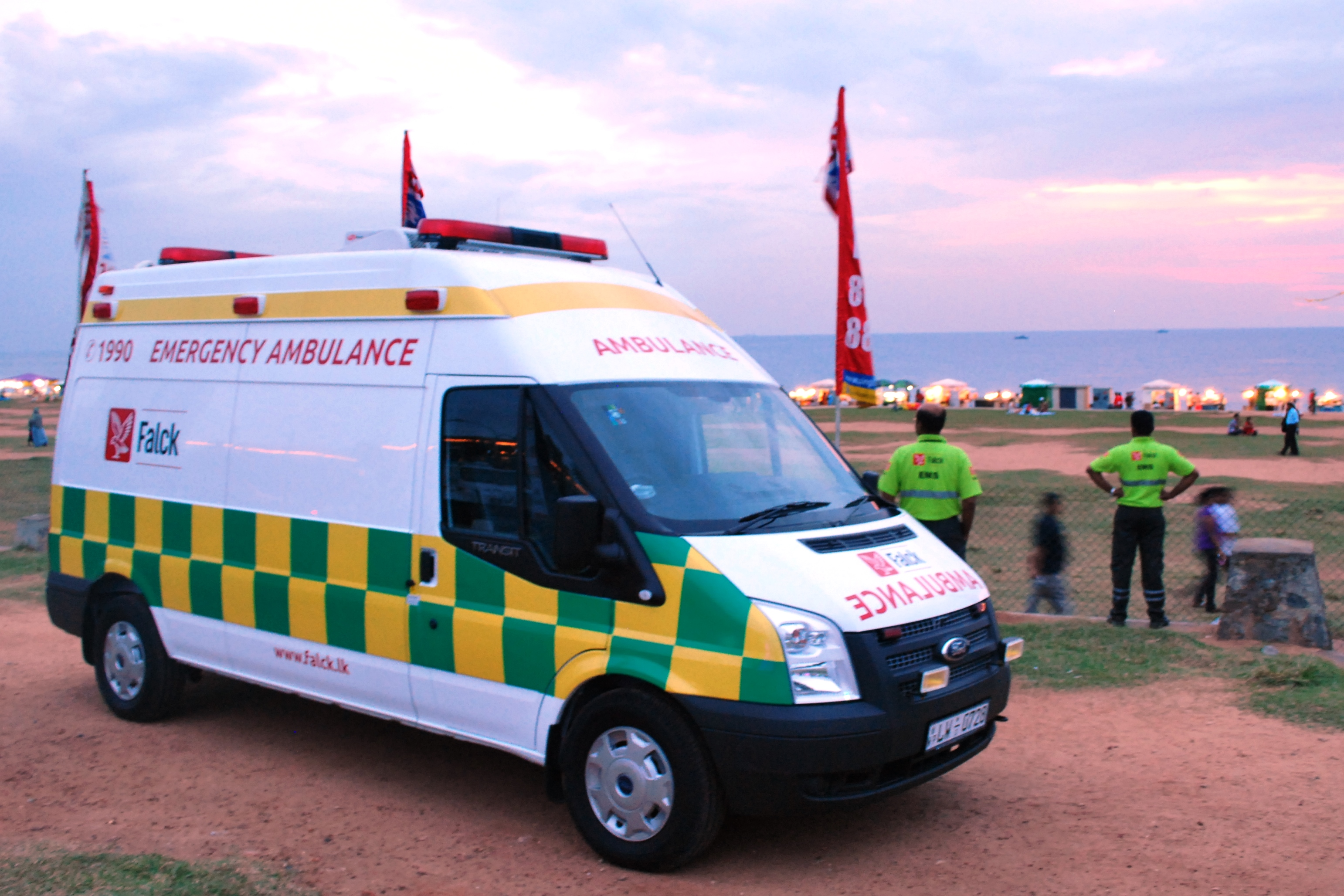
Falck Sri Lanka ambulance, 2011

After MTI concluded its operations, former team members founded Med1 (Pvt) Ltd. in 2011 to provide commercial prehospital care in Colombo and suburbs. Med1 secured the short code 1-9-9-0 and introduced motorcycle-based first responders and mobile micro-payment systems for subscriptions. Med1 was the official ambulance partner for the international IronMan race. In 2012, Danish emergency services company Falck A/S acquired a major stake in Med1 and launched expanded operations in 2013. Falck Sri Lanka operated a fleet of modern ambulances, motorcycle EMTs provided quick response, and leased helicopters for medical helicopter response nationwide. Although successful in urban response times, Falck discontinued Sri Lankan operations in 2015.

=== 1990 Suwa Seriya ambulance service (2016–present) ===
The current national ambulance service, Suwa Seriya (literally "Good Health"), accessible by dialing 1990, began in 2016 with funding from the Government of India and technical guidance from GVK-EMRI, which operates India’s 108 service. The initial US$7.6 million grant supplied 88 fully equipped ambulances and training for EMTs and dispatchers.

Suwa Seriya absorbed much of the trained workforce, dispatch systems, technology, and educational materials previously developed by Medical Teams International and by Falck Sri Lanka, creating continuity between earlier pilot systems and the new national framework. Operated as a government-owned foundation, the service rapidly expanded to nationwide coverage and was formalized under an Act of Parliament in 2018.

By 2023, Suwa Seriya had answered more than 1.8 million calls with an average response time of 12 minutes. During the COVID-19 pandemic, it transported over 175,000 patients. Its command centers employ real-time GPS tracking, algorithmic dispatching, and integrated analytics to optimize national coverage.

=== Digital innovation and connected ambulances (2023–present) ===
In late 2023, Suwa Seriya launched a "Connected Ambulance" project incorporating artificial intelligence and augmented reality to enhance prehospital care. Developed in partnership with Singapore-based Mediwave (the digital health division of Wavenet), the initiative introduced head-mounted mixed-reality displays for EMTs, allowing remote physician consultation, live access to patient health records, and automated ePCR documentation. Annual reports of the 1990 Suwa Seriya Foundation describe the Connected Ambulance as a milestone in Sri Lanka's digital transformation, supported by private donors and the "Adopt an Ambulance" fundraising program that raised LKR 750 million.

== Emergency access numbers ==
Sri Lanka maintains two emergency ambulance numbers:

- 1-1-0 – Established in 2004, still used in several regional systems under provincial health departments.
- 1-9-9-0 – Established in 2010 by Med1 Pvt Limited, remains the nationwide toll-free number for Suwa Seriya, accessible via any telephone network.

== EMT training standards ==
=== Training levels ===
The Ministry of Health's Trauma Secretariat and the Pre-Hospital Care Sub-Committee set national training standards aligned with international benchmarks such as the National Registry of Emergency Medical Technicians (US) and the Australasian Registry of Emergency Medical Technicians (AREMT).

- EMT Level 1 – Basic first responder course (~40 hours).
- EMT Level 2 – Ambulance officer/Basic EMT (120–160 hours).
- EMT Level 3 – Intermediate EMT, includes IV access and limited medications.
- EMT Level 4 – Paramedic-level advanced care. Paramedic training is currently conducted abroad for selected personnel.

=== Training materials ===
Medical Teams International developed the first EMT textbooks in Sinhala and Tamil, contextualized to local medical conditions such as organophosphate poisoning and snakebite. The Ministry of Health has adopted these textbooks for future instruction.

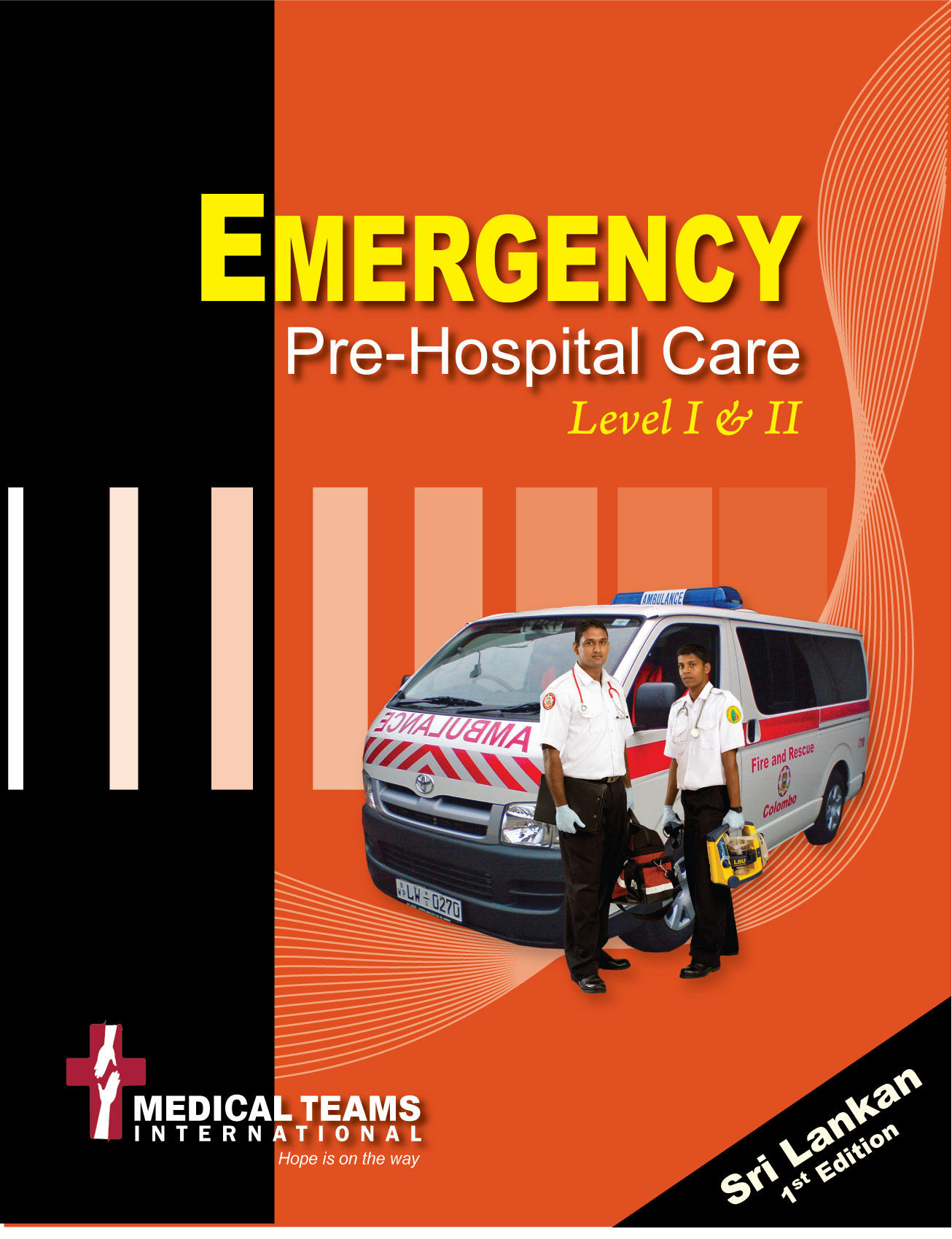
The first Emergency Medical Technician textbook published in Sinhala and Tamil, developed in 2007 by Medical Teams International and the Ministry of Health.

== System components and integration ==
Sri Lanka's EMS includes centralized call centers, medical direction via hospital physicians, integration with public hospitals, and ongoing community first-aid education. Ambulances meet World Health Organization standards for basic life support equipment.

== Challenges and future development ==
Geographic diversity, funding sustainability, and the need for continued integration across public and private services remain key challenges. The Connected Ambulance initiative and expansion of rural coverage are current priorities to sustain national resilience and rapid response.

== See also ==
- Health care in Sri Lanka
- Trauma Secretariat of Sri Lanka
- GVK Emergency Management and Research Institute
- Medical Teams International
