= Healthcare in Sri Lanka =

Development of life expectancy in Sri Lanka

Sri Lanka has a free and universal health care system. It scores higher than the regional average in healthcare having a high Life expectancy and a lower maternal and infant death rate than its neighbors. It is known for having one of the world's earliest known healthcare systems and has its own indigenous medicine system.

== History ==
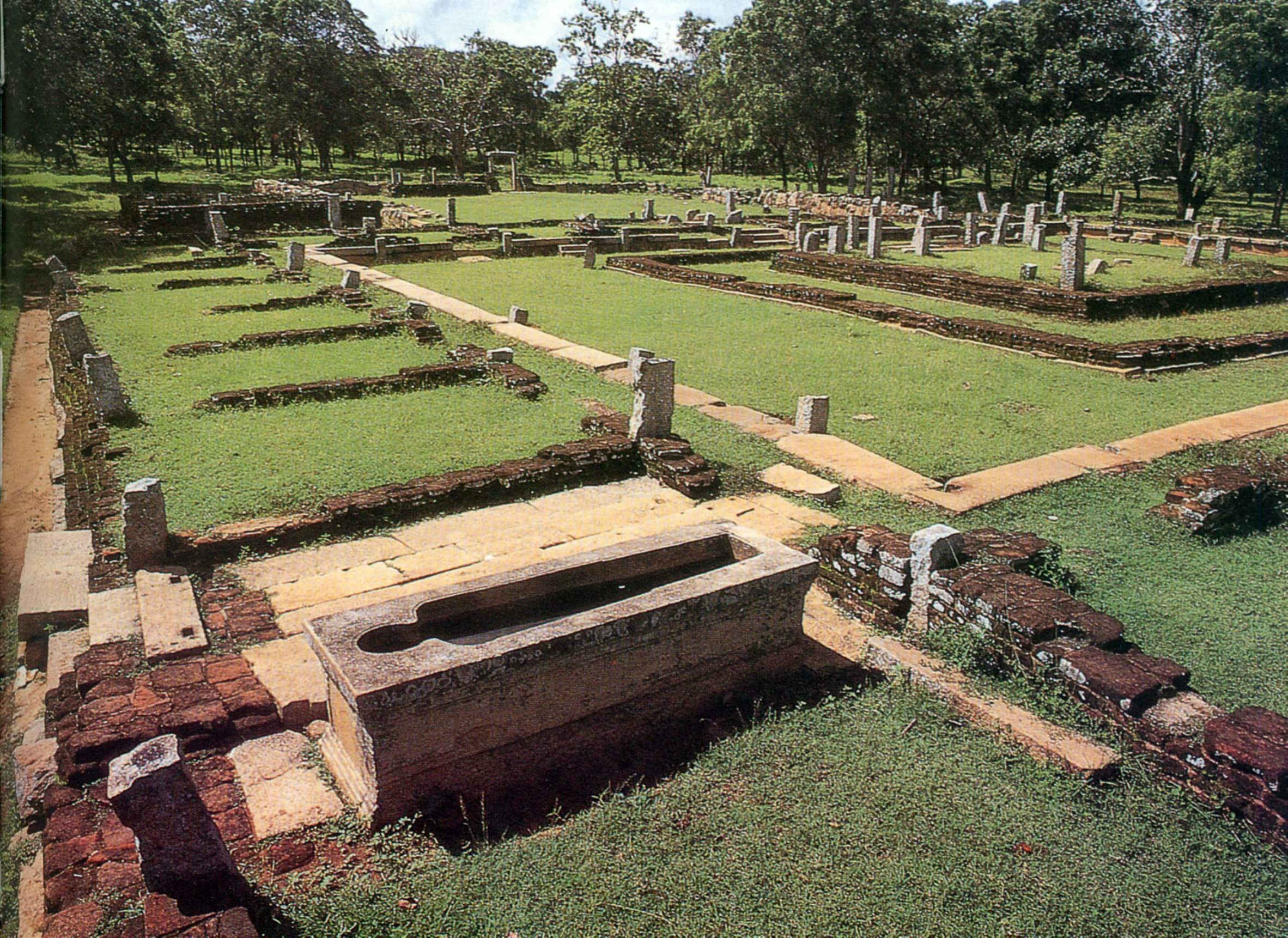
Ruins of a 2,000 year old hospital in the historical city of Anuradhapura

Sri Lankan medical traditions records back to pre historic era. Besides a number of medical discoveries that are only now being acknowledged by western medicine, according to the Mahawansa, the ancient chronicle of Sinhalese royalty King Pandukabhaya had lying-in-homes and hospitals (Sivikasotthi-Sala) built in various parts of the country after having fortified his capital at Anuradhapura in the 4th century BCE. Ruins of a hospital in Mihintale which was built by King Sena II (851-885 A.C.) that dates back to the 9th century has been discovered and it is considered one of the world's oldest hospitals. Several Sinhalese kings in ancient Sri Lanka are known to be practitioners of medicine, King Buddhadasa (340–368 AC) was said to be adept in general medicine, surgery, midwifery and veterinary medicine and he is known for the surgical operation on an outcaste (Chandala) woman in order to deliver her child and the surgical removal of a lump in the belly of a snake. "Sarartha Sangraha", a comprehensive medical treatise in Sanskrit, is also attributed to King Buddhadasa. Buddhadasa also built a healthcare system with one hospital for ten villages which would be funded by a tax on the revenue from fields of the villages. Medical men were appointed to attend troops and veterinary surgeons to attend cattle and elephants. King Aggabodhi VII (766–772 A.C.) is known for his medical research and according to the Culavamsa, the king "studied the medicinal plants over the entire island of Lanka to ascertain whether they were wholesome or harmful to the sick." Excavations of the ruins of Ancient hospitals have uncovered several surgical instruments like Forceps, Scalpels and Scissors as well as spoons that are believed to be used to mix or administer medicine. The hospitals in ancient Sri Lanka had toilets and baths that were attached to the living quarters. The hospitals had been designed for ventilation and free circulation of air due to two open courts in addition to the windows which indicates that psychological aspects of therapeutics were understood by Medical practitioners.

== Overview ==
Sri Lanka has a universal health care system that extends free healthcare to all citizens, which has been a national priority. OPD facilities are readily available in public (general) hospitals situated in major towns and cities, with laboratory and radiology facilities common in most. But most illnesses can be treated in teaching hospitals in Colombo, Colombo South, Colombo North, Kandy/Peradeniya, Galle (Karapitiya Hospital), Anuradhapura and Jaffna. All doctors and nurses in the government hospitals are qualified and trained, with some of the most experienced staff working at the teaching hospitals. For emergencies, especially accidents, it is highly recommended to go directly to general hospital accident services as they are equipped with the staff and facilities to handle emergencies.

Despite low levels of health expenditures, Sri Lanka's health indicators are comparable to more developed countries in the region. The public healthcare system also has long waiting lists for specialized care and advanced procedures. As a result, reliance on private care is increased.

== Recognized councils ==
- Sri Lankan traditional medicine
  - (Western) medicine
- Sri Lanka Ayuruvedic Council
  - Traditional Sinhala medicine
  - Ayouruveda
  - Siddha
  - Unani
- Sri Lanka Homeopathy Council
  - Homeopathy

== Hospitals ==
=== Western Medical Hospitals ===
There are 555 government hospitals in Sri Lanka, in addition to several other government hospitals treating according to the Ayurvedic System.

A large number of private hospitals have appeared in Sri Lanka, due to the rising income of people and demand for private healthcare services. They provide much more luxurious service than government hospitals, but they are mostly limited to Colombo and its suburbs and also have high prices. Some of the best known private hospitals are Nawaloka Hospital, Asiri Hospital, Hemas Hospital, Lanka Hospitals and the Durdans Hospitals. In Colombo, many of the private hospitals are located in Narahenpita area; namely, Asiri, Asiri Surgical, Oasis, Ninewells, etc. In addition to Colombo, many leading cities such as Gampaha, Kandy, Galle also have private hospitals.

As of 2014 the public sector accounted for 73% of the hospitals and 93% of the available bed capacity in Sri Lanka, while handling over 90% of the total patient admissions and outpatient visits to hospitals. In the private sector, the top five players the Dr Neville Fernando Teaching Hospital (NFTH), Asiri, Nawaloka Hospitals PLC (Nawaloka), Durdans Hospitals (Durdans) and The Lanka Hospitals – accounted for nearly 45% of the private-sector bed capacity, with NFTH the market leader with 1,002 beds.

== Medical schools ==
=== (Western) medicine ===
- Faculty of Medicine, University of Colombo (formerly the Ceylon Medical College)
  - Postgraduate Institute of Medicine, University of Colombo
- Faculty of Medicine, University of Peradeniya
- Faculty of Medicine, University of Jaffna
- Faculty of Medical Sciences, University of Sri Jayawardenapura
- Faculty of Medicine, University of Kelaniya (formerly the North Colombo Medical College)
- Faculty of Medicine, University of Ruhuna
- Faculty of Medicine, Rajarata University
- Faculty of Healthcare and Sciences, Eastern University
- Faculty of Medicine, University of Moratuwa
- Faculty of Medicine, General Sir John Kotelawala Defence University
- Faculty of Allied Health Sciences, General Sir John Kotelawala Defence University

=== Other ===
==== Sinhala traditional medicine ====
No formal system exist for traditional Sinhala medical education.

==== Other systems of traditional medicine ====
1 Institute of Indigenous Medicine, University of Colombo 2 Gampaha Wickramarachchi Ayurveda Institute, University of Kelaniya 3 University of Jaffna

== Professional associations ==
- Sri Lanka Medical Association
- College of Community Physicians of Sri Lanka
- Government Medical Officers Association
- Government Medical Officers Forum

== Eye donation ==
Sri Lanka is one of the biggest donors of human eyes to the world, with a supply of approximately 3,000 corneas per year.

== See also ==
- Health in Sri Lanka
- Sri Lanka Medical Council
- Sri Lanka National Pharmaceuticals Policy
