= Asoka barb =

Conservation status
- Critically Endangered (IUCN 3.1)

Scientific classification
- Kingdom: Animalia
- Phylum: Chordata
- Class: Actinopterygii
- Order: Cypriniformes
- Family: Cyprinidae
- Subfamily: Smiliogastrinae
- Genus: Systomus
- Species: S. asoka

Binomial name
- Systomus asoka (Kottelat & Pethiyagoda, 1989)

Synonyms
- Puntius asoka Kottelat & Pethiyagoda, 1989

Species of fish

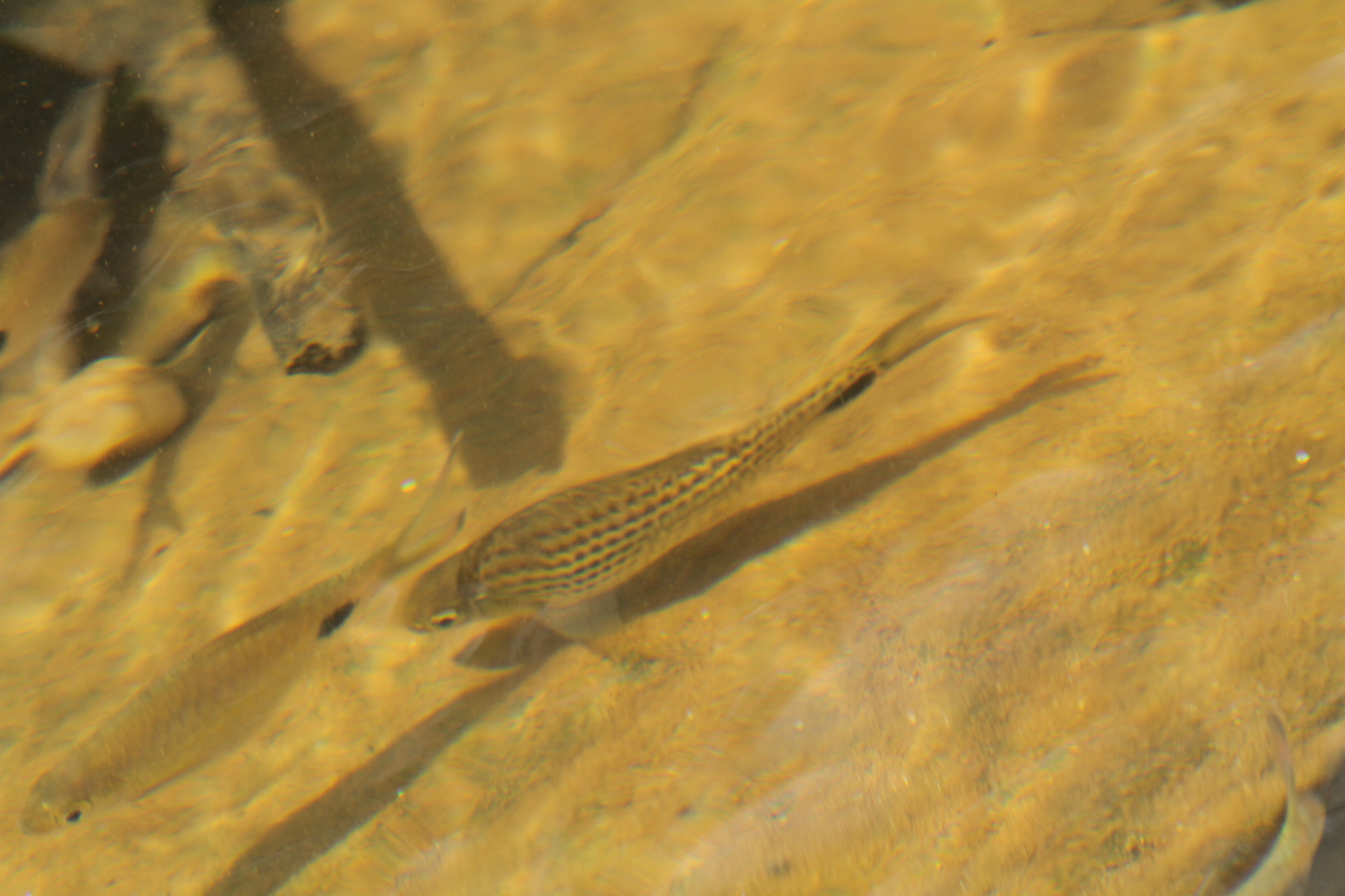
Specimen of Systomus asoka

The Asoka barb (Systomus asoka) is a species of cyprinid fish endemic to Sri Lanka where it is found in the upper reaches of the Sitawaka River and its tributaries, and Kelani near Kitulgala. This fish can reach a length of 17 centimetres (6.7 in) TL.

== Biology ==
Asoka barb inhabit relatively deep (1–2 m), fast-flowing water in areas with gravel or sand substrates. Juveniles ( 1–3 cm TL) shoal together in schools of 30–100 individuals in very shallow water (5–25 cm) downstream whereas adults occupy deeper water (1–2m) upstream. They usually occupy unshaded areas. They are fast swimmers and are not easily identified from water surface. This species can be found in fresh water which has 6.5–7.5 pH range and 25–30 °C temperature.
