= Systomus jacobusboehlkei =

Conservation status
- Least Concern (IUCN 3.1)

Scientific classification
- Kingdom: Animalia
- Phylum: Chordata
- Class: Actinopterygii
- Order: Cypriniformes
- Family: Cyprinidae
- Subfamily: Smiliogastrinae
- Genus: Systomus
- Species: S. jacobusboehlkei

Binomial name
- Systomus jacobusboehlkei (Fowler, 1958)

Synonyms
- Barbus jacobusboehlkei Fowler, 1958; Puntius jacobusboehlkei (Fowler, 1958); Puntius takhoaensis Nguyen & Doan, 1969; Barbodes jacobusboehlkei (Fowler, 1958)

Species of fish

Systomus jacobusboehlkei is a species of cyprinid fish native to the lower Mekong and Chao Phraya Basins of Cambodia, Vietnam, Laos, and Thailand. It inhabits marshlands and floodplains, swamps, and small, slow-flowing tributaries. It is present in local food fisheries, along with other small species. This species can reach a length of 12 centimetres (4.7 in) SL.
