= Systomus compressiformis =

Conservation status
- Critically endangered, possibly extinct (IUCN 3.1)

Scientific classification
- Kingdom: Animalia
- Phylum: Chordata
- Class: Actinopterygii
- Division: Teleostei
- Order: Cypriniformes
- Family: Cyprinidae
- Subfamily: Smiliogastrinae
- Genus: Systomus
- Species: S. compressiformis

Binomial name
- Systomus compressiformis (Cockerell, 1913)

Synonyms
- Barbus compressiformis Cockerell, 1913; Percocypris compressiformis (Cockerell, 1913); Puntius compressiformis (Cockerell, 1913)

Species of fish

Systomus compressiformis is a species of cyprinid fish endemic to Inle Lake, Myanmar. It is threatened by anthropogenic changes to the lake, including the introduction of non-native species of plants and fish.
