= Golden systomus =

Scientific classification
- Domain: Eukaryota
- Kingdom: Animalia
- Phylum: Chordata
- Class: Actinopterygii
- Order: Cypriniformes
- Family: Cyprinidae
- Subfamily: Smiliogastrinae
- Genus: Systomus
- Species: S. chryseus

Binomial name
- Systomus chryseus Plamoottil, 2014

Species of fish

The golden systomus (Systomus chryseus) is a species of cyprinid fish endemic to India. This species can reach a length of 15.2 centimetres (6.0 in) SL. It is a gold colour and has pelvic and anal fins that are orange red.
