= Fire services in Sri Lanka =

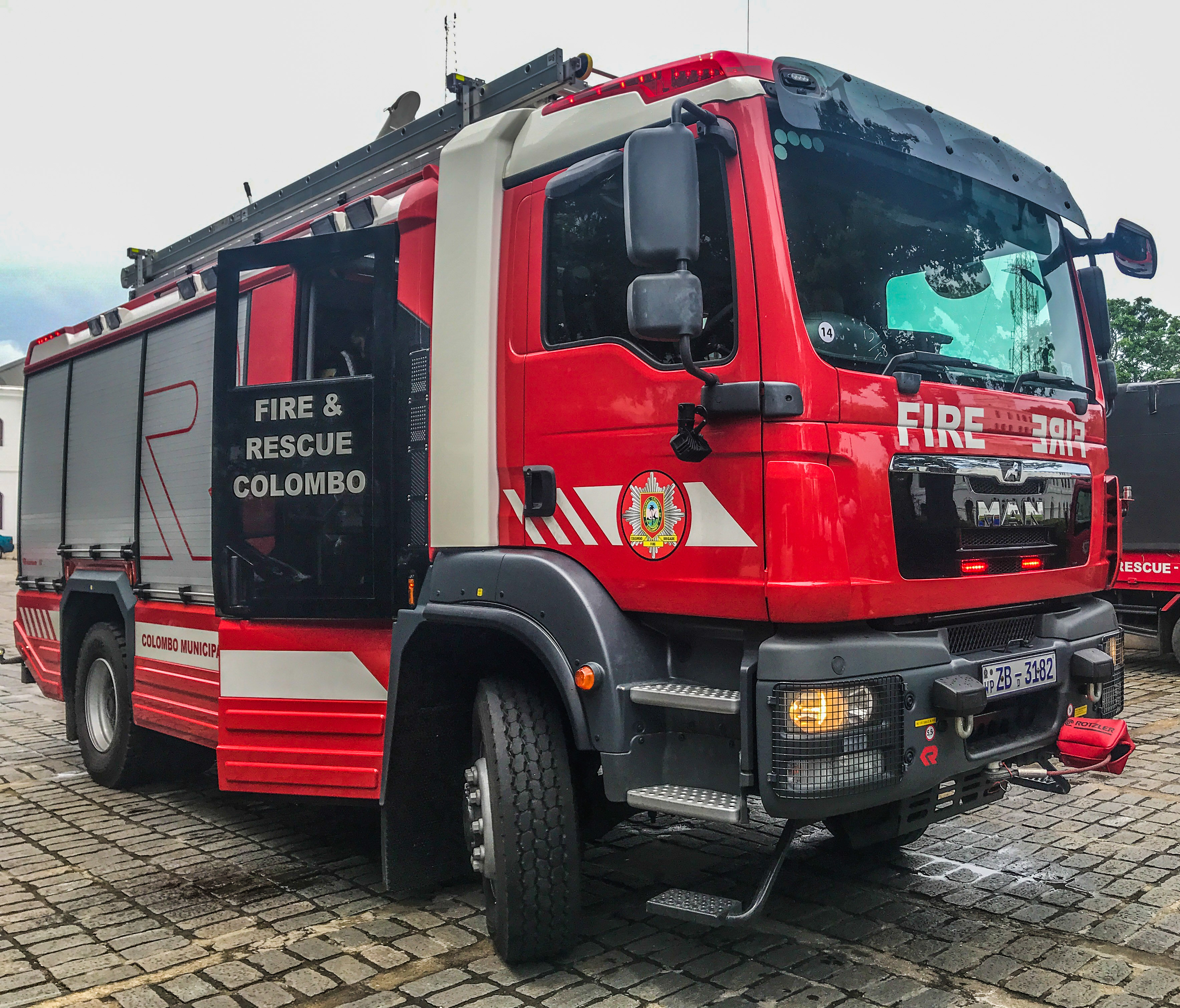
Colombo Fire Brigade Rosenbauer AT Fire Engine

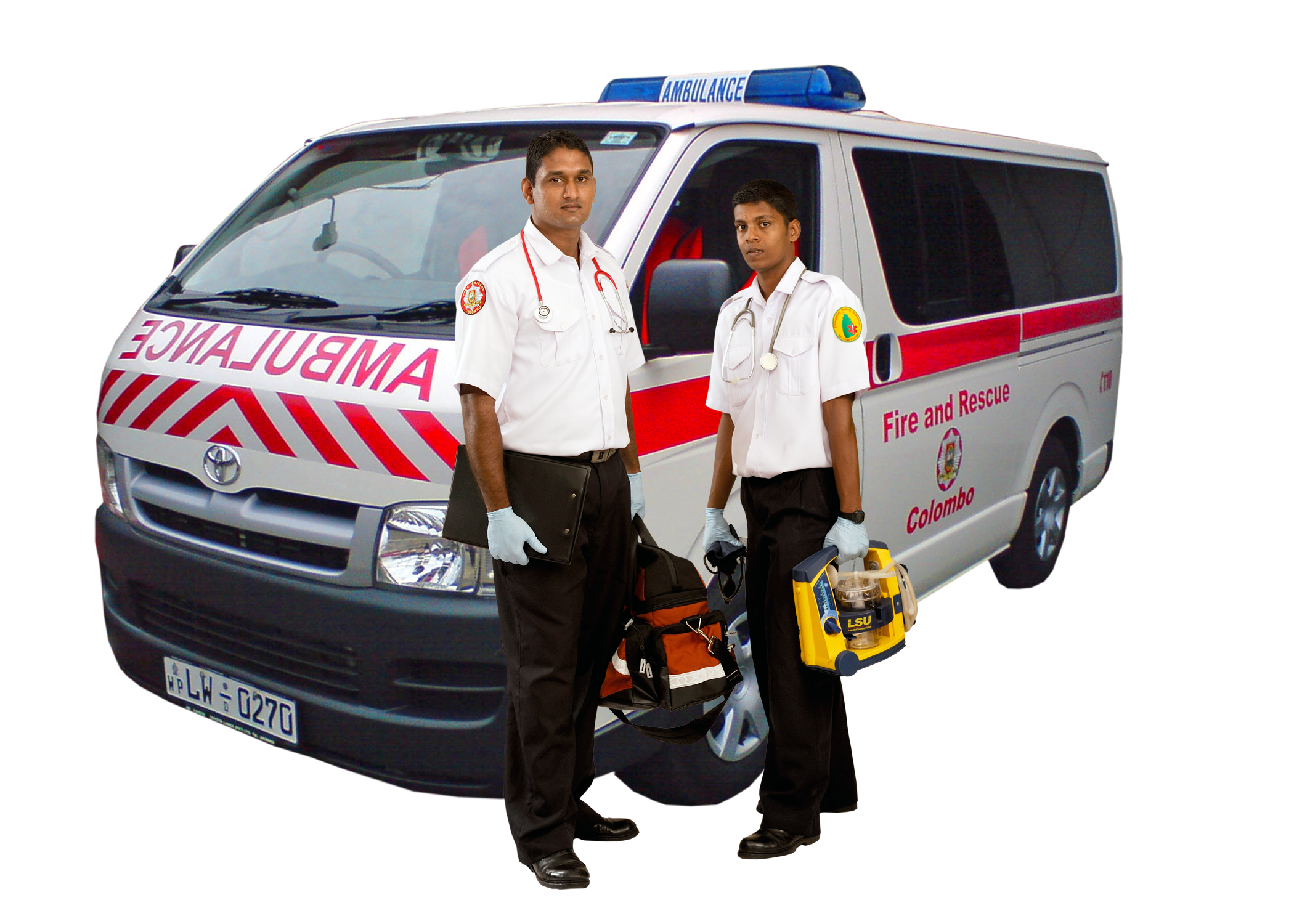
An ambulance of the Colombo Municipal Council Fire Service.

The fire services in Sri Lanka operate under the local governments.

== List of Fire Brigades ==
- Colombo Fire Service Department - Colombo Municipal Council
- Negombo Fire and Rescue - Negombo Municipal Council
- Kotte Fire Brigade - Sri Jayawardanapura Kotte Municipal Council
- Kandy Fire Brigade - Kandy Municipal Council
- Gampaha Fire Service Department - Gampaha Municipal Council
- Kalutara Fire Brigade - Kalutara Municipal Council
- Matara Fire & Rescue - Matara Municipal Council
- Polonnawruwa Fire Brigade - Polonnaruwa Municipal Council
- Anuradhapura Fire Brigade - Anuradhapura Municipal Council
- Jaffna Fire Brigade - Jaffna Municipal Council
- Moratuwa Fire & Rescue - Moratuwa Municipal Council
- Bandarawela Fire & Rescue - Bandarawela Municipal Council
- Badulla Fire Brigade - Badulla Municipal Council
- Kurunegala Fire & Rescue - Kurunegala Municipal Council
- Nuwara Eliya Fire & Rescue - Nuwara Eliya Municipal Council
- Ampara Fire & Rescue - Municipal Council Ampara
- Trincomalee Fire & Rescue - Trincomalee Municipal Council
- Ratnapura Fire Brigade - Ratnapura Municipal Council
- Horana Fire & Rescue Unit - Horana Urban Council
- Chilaw Fire & Rescue - Chilaw Urban Council
- Kilinochchi Fire Service Division - Karachchi Pradeshiya Sabha
- Mawanella Fire Service Division - Mawanella Pradeshiya Sabha
- Sri Lanka Air Force Fire and Rescue Unit
- Airport Fire & Rescue - BIA Katunayaka
- Airport Fire Brigade - MRIA Mattala
- Awissawella BOI Fire Department - BOI Awissawella
- Kalmunai Fire Brigade - Kalmunai Municipal Council

== See also ==
- Sri Lanka Civil Security Force
- Suwa Seriya Ambulance Service
