= Systomus immaculatus =

Scientific classification
- Kingdom: Animalia
- Phylum: Chordata
- Class: Actinopterygii
- Order: Cypriniformes
- Family: Cyprinidae
- Subfamily: Smiliogastrinae
- Genus: Systomus
- Species: S. immaculatus

Binomial name
- Systomus immaculatus McClelland, 1839

Species of fish

Systomus immaculatus is a species of cyprinid fish endemic to the Assam region in India. This species can reach a length of 19.3 centimetres (7.6 in) SL.
