= Systomus laticeps =

Scientific classification
- Domain: Eukaryota
- Kingdom: Animalia
- Phylum: Chordata
- Class: Actinopterygii
- Order: Cypriniformes
- Family: Cyprinidae
- Subfamily: Smiliogastrinae
- Genus: Systomus
- Species: S. laticeps

Binomial name
- Systomus laticeps Plamoottil, 2016

Species of fish

Systomus laticeps is a species of cyprinid fish which was described in 2016 from specimens taken in Kerala, southern India. It is found in single freshwater stream at Thiruvalla in the Pathanamthitta District where a confluence of rivers flowing through low-lying areas creates this fishes habitat. The stream is 1-2m deep in the summer monsoon and 37 cm across, it has muddy substrates and has a dense growth of emergent vegetation.
