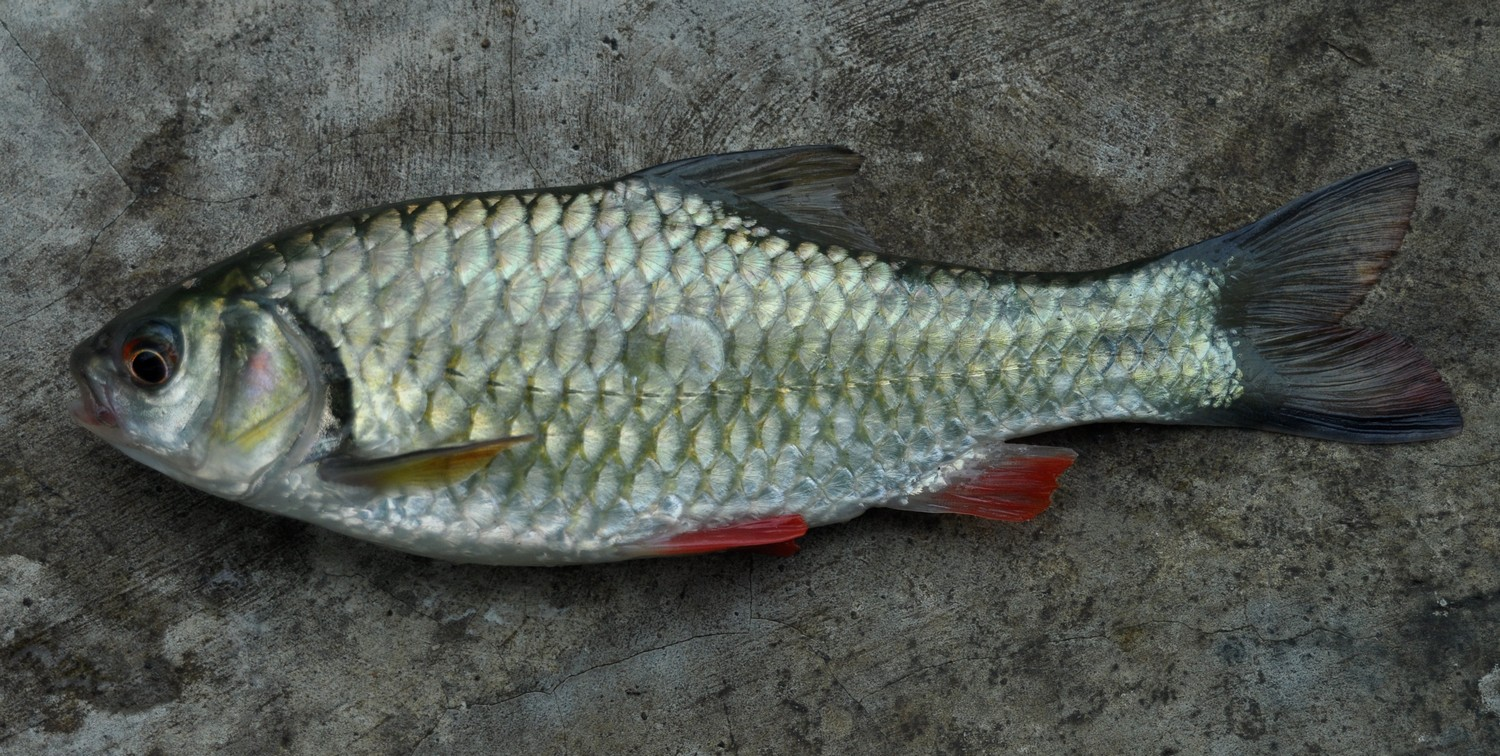
- Javaen barb (Systomus rubripinnis)

Scientific classification
- Kingdom: Animalia
- Phylum: Chordata
- Class: Actinopterygii
- Order: Cypriniformes
- Family: Cyprinidae
- Subfamily: Smiliogastrinae
- Genus: Systomus; McClelland, 1839

Type species
- Systomus immaculatus McClelland, 1839

= Systomus =

Genus of fishes

Systomus is a genus of fish in the family Cyprinidae native to tropical Asia.

== Species ==
The recognized species in this genus are:

- Systomus asoka (Kottelat & Pethiyagoda, 1989) (Asoka barb)
- Systomus binduchitra (Hora, 1937)
- Systomus chryseus Plamoottil, 2014 (Golden systomus)
- Systomus compressiformis (Cockerell, 1913)
- Systomus diliciosus (McClelland 1839)
- Systomus gracilus Plamoottil & Maji, 2020
- Systomus immaculatus McClelland, 1839
- Systomus jacobusboehlkei (Fowler, 1958)
- Systomus laticeps Plamoottil, 2016
- Systomus martenstyni (Kottelat & Pethiyagoda, 1991) (Martenstyn's barb)
- Systomus orphoides (Valenciennes, 1842)
- Systomus pleurotaenia (Bleeker, 1863) (Side-striped barb)
- Systomus rubripinnis (Valenciennes, 1842) (Javean barb)
- Systomus rufus Plamoottil, 2014 (Red-finned kuruva)
- Systomus sarana (Hamilton, 1822) (Olive barb)
- Systomus sewelli (Prashad & Mukerji, 1929)
