= Red-finned kuruva =

Scientific classification
- Domain: Eukaryota
- Kingdom: Animalia
- Phylum: Chordata
- Class: Actinopterygii
- Order: Cypriniformes
- Family: Cyprinidae
- Subfamily: Smiliogastrinae
- Genus: Systomus
- Species: S. rufus

Binomial name
- Systomus rufus (Plamoottil, 2014)

Species of fish

The Red-finned kuruva (Systomus rufus) is a species of cyprinid fish endemic to India. This species can reach a length of 10.6 centimetres (4.2 in) SL. It is known only to a single stream in Kerala.
