= Two spot barb =

Two spot barb is a common name for several fish and may refer to:

- Pethia cumingii
- Pethia ticto
- Puntius bimaculatus
