= Side-striped barb =

Conservation status
- Vulnerable (IUCN 3.1)

Scientific classification
- Kingdom: Animalia
- Phylum: Chordata
- Class: Actinopterygii
- Order: Cypriniformes
- Family: Cyprinidae
- Subfamily: Smiliogastrinae
- Genus: Systomus
- Species: S. pleurotaenia

Binomial name
- Systomus pleurotaenia (Bleeker, 1863)

Synonyms
- Puntius pleurotaenia Bleeker, 1863; Barbus pleurotaenia (Bleeker, 1863)

Species of fish

The side-striped barb or black-lined barb (Systomus pleurotaenia) is a species of cyprinid fish endemic to Sri Lanka where it occurs in the catchment of the Kelani and Nilwala Rivers. This species can reach a length of 16 centimetres (6.3 in) TL. It is of minor importance to local commercial fisheries and can also be found in the aquarium trade.
