= Martenstyn's barb =

Conservation status
- Endangered (IUCN 3.1)

Scientific classification
- Kingdom: Animalia
- Phylum: Chordata
- Class: Actinopterygii
- Order: Cypriniformes
- Family: Cyprinidae
- Subfamily: Smiliogastrinae
- Genus: Systomus
- Species: S. martenstyni

Binomial name
- Systomus martenstyni (Kottelat & Pethiyagoda, 1991)

Synonyms
- Puntius martenstyni Kottelat & Pethiyagoda, 1991

Species of fish

Martenstyn's Barb (Systomus martenstyni) is a species of cyprinid fish endemic to Sri Lanka. This species can reach a length of 25 centimetres (9.8 in). It is important to local commercial fisheries.
