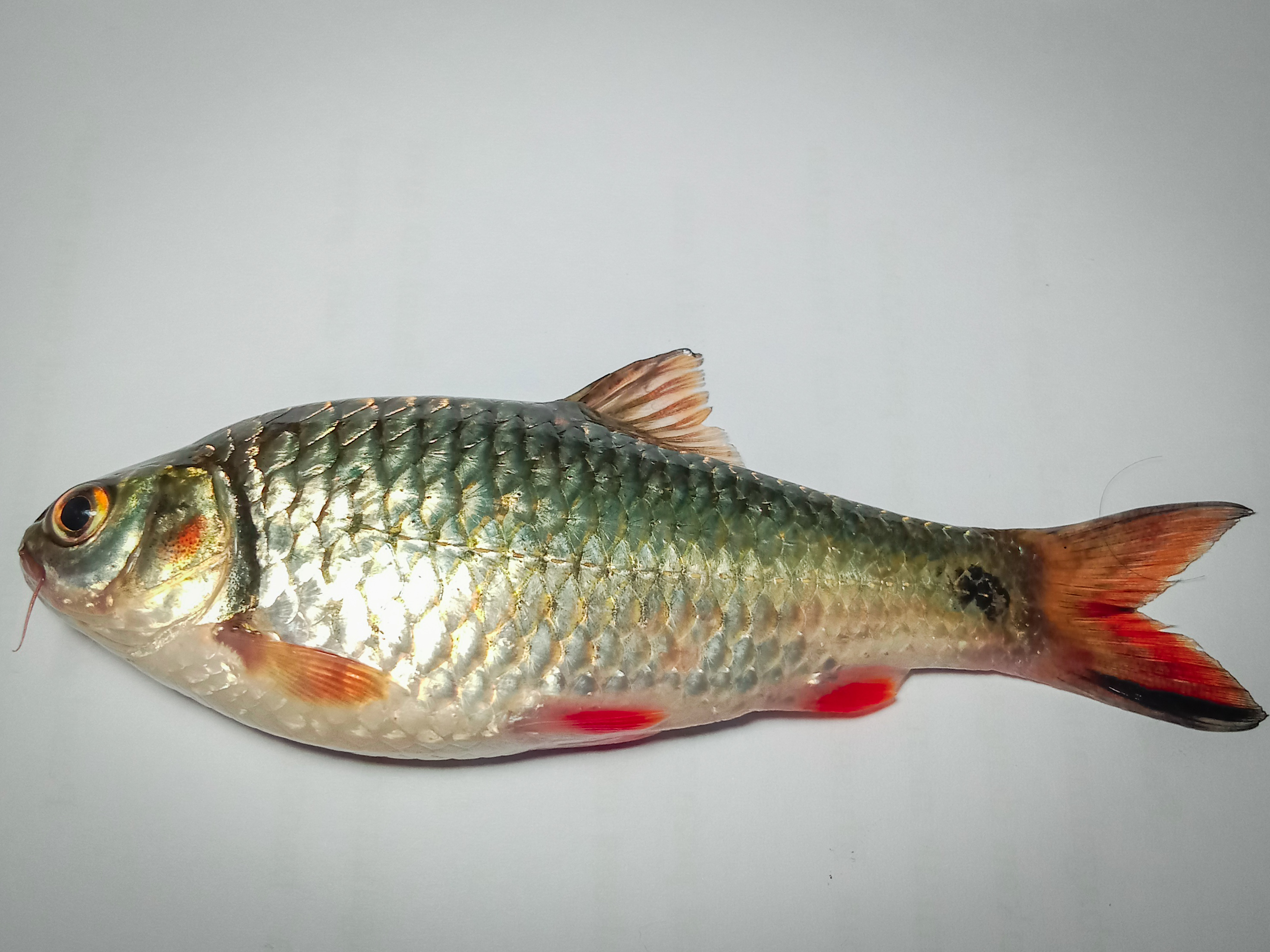

Conservation status
- Data Deficient (IUCN 3.1)

Scientific classification
- Kingdom: Animalia
- Phylum: Chordata
- Class: Actinopterygii
- Order: Cypriniformes
- Family: Cyprinidae
- Genus: Systomus
- Species: S. rubripinnis

Binomial name
- Systomus rubripinnis (Valenciennes, 1842)

Synonyms
- Barbodes rubripinnis (Valenciennes, 1842); Barbus caudimarginatus Blyth, 1860; Barbus rubripinnis Valenciennes, 1842; Barbus sarana caudimarginatus Blyth, 1860; Barbus sarananella Bleeker, 1849; Barbus saranella Bleeker, 1849; Barbus sewelli Prashad & Mukerji, 1929; Puntius rubripinna (Valenciennes, 1842); Systomus rubripinna (Valenciennces, 1842)

= Javaen barb =

Species of fish

The Javaen barb (Systomus rubripinnis), is a species of cyprinid fish native to Southeast Asia. It can reach a length of 25 centimetres (9.8 in) SL and is of minor importance to local commercial fisheries.

== Identification ==
Can reach a total length of 25 cm (9.8 in) but is more common at half that size. 31-34 lateral scales. Red caudal fin with a black marginal stripe along each lobe. A black spot at the base of the caudal fin. Young individuals may exhibit black lateral lines along the body.

Genetic variability is well documented, the species can vary in appearance somewhat depending on locality with a number of variants recognized, some of which exhibit a greater degree or lack of red color pattern in the finnage.

== Habitat ==
Can be found in rivers, but mainly in smaller streams, canals and on floodplains (during breeding season). Occasionally found in impoundments, but usually stays in the flowing streams leading to the impoundment. During breeding season, adults will move into seasonally inundated areas and release eggs at the start of the rainy season. Young of the year appear in streams in July and August. Adults leave the floodplains when the water recedes in December or January

== Distribution ==
Chao Phraya, Mekong and Mae Khlong basins, Malay Peninsula and Indonesia.

Local catch history in Peninsular Malaysia indicates the species was only found in the far northern states (Perlis, Perak, Kelantan and Terengganu) and the far southern tip, Johor. However, recently new populations are documented in other states where previously no catch records were present (Pahang and Selangor). This has been attributed to aquarist and fisherman releasing the barb into new river channels as it coincides with the species rise in popularity in the fish trade, this is currently unconfirmed.
