= List of ecoregions in Sri Lanka =

The following is a list of ecoregions in Sri Lanka. Due to High rainfall and even sunlight throughout the year, Sri Lanka exhibits a great variety in ecoregions in all living habitats. Together with Western Ghats, Sri Lanka forms Western Ghats and Sri Lanka hotspot. It is considered one of the eight super-hotspots. Some of the ecoregions also included in Global 200 list too.

== Terrestrial ecoregions ==
=== Tropical and subtropical moist broadleaf forests ===
- Sri Lanka lowland rain forests
- Sri Lanka montane rain forests

=== Tropical and subtropical dry broadleaf forests ===
- Sri Lanka dry-zone dry evergreen forests

=== Deserts and xeric shrublands ===
- Deccan thorn scrub forests

== Freshwater ecoregions ==
- Sri Lanka Dry Zone
- Sri Lanka Wet Zone

== Marine ecoregions ==
West and South Indian Shelf

- South India and Sri Lanka

== Global 200 ==
=== Terrestrial ===
- Sri Lanka lowland rain forests
- Sri Lanka montane rain forests

=== Freshwater ===
- Southwestern Sri Lanka rivers and streams

== See also ==
- Lists of ecoregions by country
