= Health in Sri Lanka =

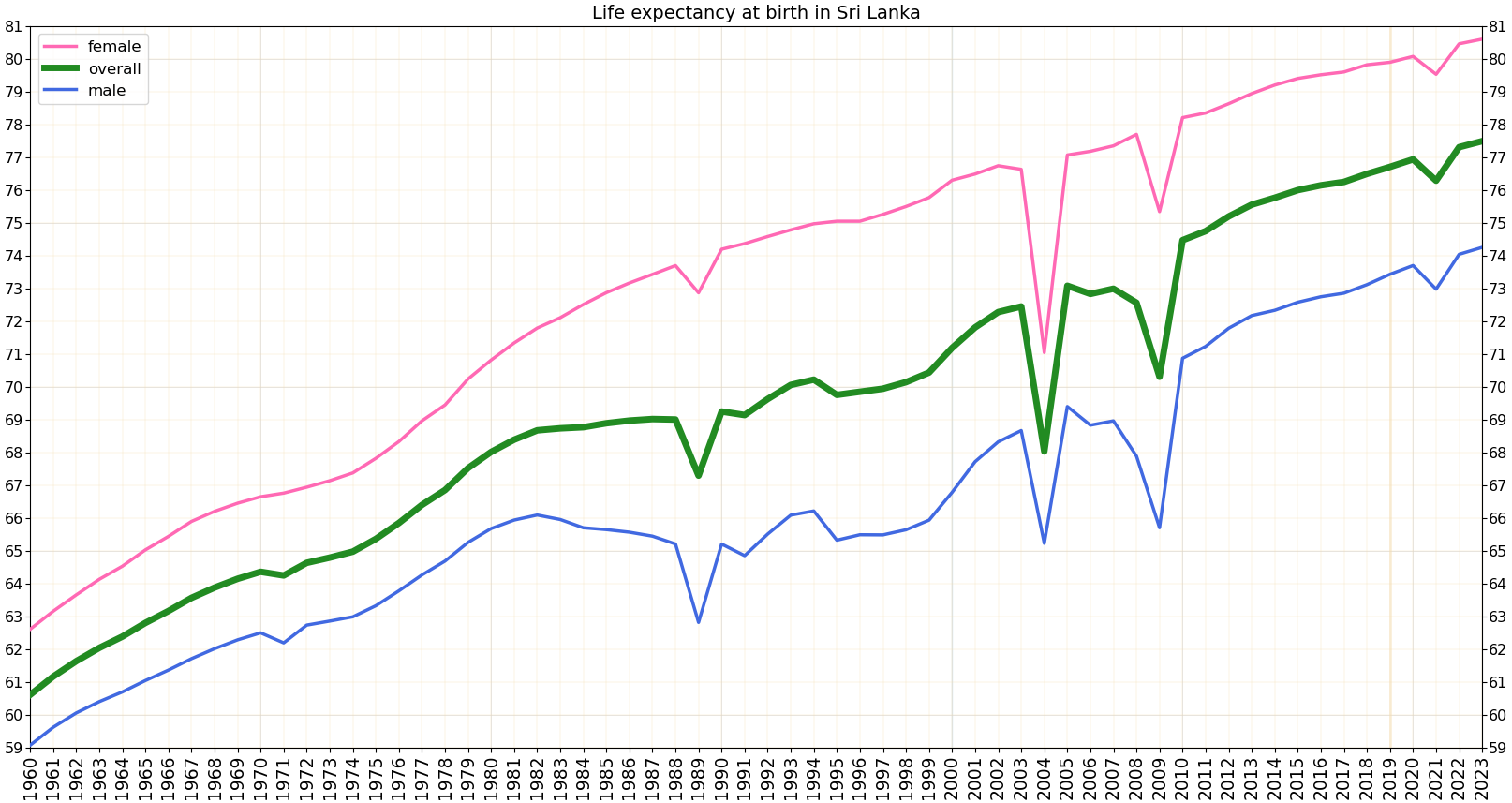
Life expectancy in Sri Lanka

Sri Lanka scores higher than the regional average in healthcare having a high life expectancy and a lower maternal and infant death rate than its neighbors. In 2018 life expectancy was 72.1 for men and 78.5 for women ranking the country 70th in the world.

The Human Rights Measurement Initiative finds that Sri Lanka is fulfilling 86.7% of what it should be fulfilling for the right to health based on its level of income.

== Diet ==
Sri Lankans eat a variety of foods that can form a wholesome and healthy diet. The long history of vegetarianism on the island has led to a variety of vegetable dishes, while a long-standing commitment to using natural sweeteners such as kithul (treacle) means Sri Lanka has avoided the issues related to the overuse of sugar in diets. A substantial use of fish, instead of other meats, has also increased the healthiness of the Sri Lankan diet.

While Sri Lankans tend to eat food that should achieve a healthy diet, the manner in which they casually choose how much food to eat often results in diet-related health problems.

The diet can often contain too much carbohydrates, due to a cultural preference for finding rice and other staples appetizing, increasing the chance of diabetes, while disproportionately leaving out vegetable-based side dishes, and often completely leaving out dairy-based dishes. An overuse of oil and coconut oil has also been identified as a cause of diet-related problems.

== See also ==
- Healthcare in Sri Lanka
- CKDu in Sri Lanka
