= College of Community Physicians of Sri Lanka =

Sri Lankan professional association

The College of Community Physicians of Sri Lanka (CCPSL) is the professional association of the Public Health Practitioners in Sri Lanka. The membership consists of specialists in Community Medicine and master's degree holders in Community Medicine. In addition to these professionals, there are members from other specialties as well. This organisation is incorporated by an act of Parliament No.18/99.

== History ==
The first professional association of public health officers in Sri Lanka was the Society of Medical officers of health which was established during the British colonial era on 26 November 1927. It was established with a view to safeguarding interests of its members and promoting public health in the country and stimulating interest of the public in matters relevant to their health. Dr. F.E. Bridger was the first president. It started with a membership of 26 which rose to 56 in 4 years. The society consisted of Medical Officers of Health (MOH), specialists in public health and professionals engaged in the advancement of public health. The transactions of the society of medical officers of health of Ceylon was their annual journal, made up of papers presented at the annual meeting.

In 1960, the society changed its name to the “Ceylon Public Health Association”. It brought under its banner all persons involved in public health thus making it an exclusive forum for both medical and non-medical professionals equally. These included clinicians, sanitary engineers, health educators and invariably MOHs. The journal was also renamed as the Journal of the Ceylon Public Health Association. In 1960, the society reached a state of dormancy. In 1970, some keen public health practitioners formed the Sri Lanka association of preventive and social medicine. Dr. M.P.M.Cooray was its inaugural president while Dr. Terrance Fernando was the secretary. The association was again renamed as the Sri Lanka association of Community Medicine. The association organised regular guest lectures and symposia. A one-day scientific session was an annual feature. High quality research papers were presented to the highly attended membership. Annual sessions were followed by the general meeting. Presidential address preceded the annual dinner in the evening.

In 1994, the members unanimously adopted a resolution to convert the association to a college. It was named The College of Community Physicians of Sri Lanka. Professor Dulitha Fernando was the first president. Initial membership was 180. The first council meeting was held on 13 December 1995. The first annual sessions were held on 6 and 7 December 1996. In the inaugural ceremony Professor Savithri Gunasekera, the vice chancellor of the University of Colombo was the chief guest. The oldest and most distinguished member and a past president Dr. W.A. Karunaratne was admitted as the first fellow of the college.

As a mark of recognition of the service rendered by the College of Community Physicians in promoting public health in Sri Lanka, the World Health Organization has supported the college to establish a public health forum. The forum was ceremoniously opened by Dr. Samlee Plianbangchang, the Regional Director of the WHO South East Asian Region (SEAR) on 11 April 2008.

== Journal ==
The journal of the College of Community Physicians of Sri Lanka carries research articles. The College has published a millennium supplement of Public Health Development in Sri Lanka which reflects the evolution of different disciplines within Public Health in the country.

College colours are Gold and Maroon. College logo shows goddess Hygieia holding the internationally accepted symbol of snake and staff in one hand and in other the torch bearing the flame of knowledge in the foreground of the replica of Sri Lanka. Hygieia in Greek mythology is the goddess of health. She was the daughter of Aesclepius who is the god of medicine. Aesculapian snakes were kept in the combination hospital temple built by the ancient Greeks and later by Romans in honour of the God. Aesclepius is often pictured with his staff around which is entwined one of these snakes.

The objectives of the college of community physicians of Sri Lanka are to advance the knowledge and to promote research and post graduate education in Community Medicine, to act as an authoritative body so as to promote for the public benefit, the advancement of knowledge in Community Medicine, to promote fellowship and support persons and institutions engaged in practice and research in Community Medicine.

== Presidents ==
Following are the presidents of the college:

- 1995-96- Professor Dulitha Fernando
- 1996-97- Professor Dulitha Fernando
- 1997-98- Dr Malani De Silva
- 1998-99- Dr S.A.P.Gnanisara
- 1999-00- Dr H.M.S.S.D.Herath
- 2000-01- Dr A.N.A.Abeysundare
- 2001-02- Professor Rohini Seneviratne
- 2002-03– Professor Lalani Rajapakse
- 2003-04- Dr Manil Fernando
- 2004-05- Dr Dulcie De Silva
- 2005-06- Dr Stanly De Silva
- 2006-07- Dr. Pushpa Jayawardane
- 2007-08- Dr Pushpa Jayawardane
- 2008-09- Professor Rajitha Wickramasinghe
- 2009-10- Dr. Sujatha Samarakoon
- 2010-11- Dr.Rabindra Abeysinghe
- 2011-12- Dr. Vinya Ariyaratne
- 2012-13- Dr.Sussie Perera
- 2013-14- Dr. Paba Palihawadana
- 2014-15- Dr. Chitramali De Silva (Banduthilake)
- 2015-16 Dr. Deepika Attygalle
- 2016-17 Professor Chrishantha Abeysena
- 2017-18 Dr. Hemantha Herath
- 2018-19 Dr. Janaki Vidanapathirana
