= Sri Lankan traditional medicine =

Alternative medicine

Sri Lanka has its own indigenous scheme of traditional medicine which is called hela wedakama. The practice is not associated with ayurveda. This system has been practised for thousands of years. On the other hand, the Sri Lankan hela wedakama tradition is a mixture of Sinhala traditional medicine, mainland āyurveda and Siddha systems of India, Unani medicine of Greece through the Arabs, and most importantly, the Desheeya Chikitsa, which is the indigenous medicine of Sri Lanka. College teaching of these systems began in 1929 at what is now the Institute of Indigenous Medicine of the University of Colombo. The Siddha Medicine Unit moved to the University of Jaffna in 1984.
