= Institute of Indigenous Medicine =

Educational institution in Sri Lanka

Faculty of Indigenous Medicine, University of Colombo
- Type: Public
- Established: 1977
- Location: Colombo, Sri Lanka
- Website: http://iim.cmb.ac.lk

The Faculty of Indigenous Medicine of the University of Colombo, specialising in Ayurveda and the Sri Lankan traditional medicine. Founded as the College of Indigenous Medicine in 1929, it became part of the University of Colombo adopting its current name in 1977. It is a premier center of undergraduate and postgraduate study and research into Ayurveda and Indigenous Medicine and Healthcare.

== History ==
The original campus signpost in 1929.

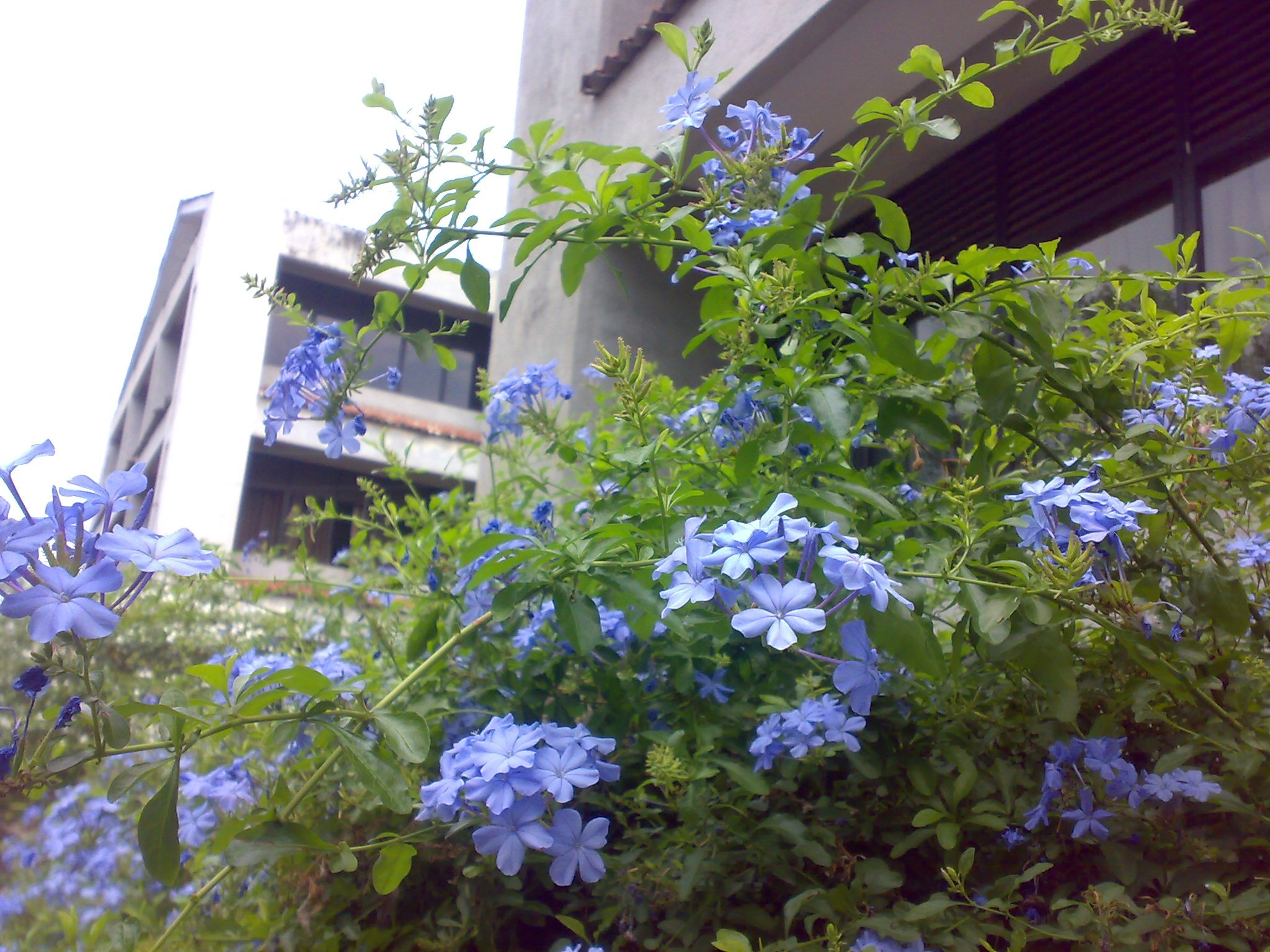
Administrative Unit of Institute of Indigenous Medicine.

IIM was first established as the Swadeshiya Vaidya Vidyalaya (College of Indigenous Medicine) on June 10, 1929, and it was inaugurated by the then Governor of Ceylon, Sir Herbert James Stanley, at the Bauer Building situated at Cotta Road, Borella. Captain (Dr) A.N.N Panikker of the Indian Medical Service who had qualified in western medicine in Edinburgh and possessed a sound training in Ayurveda sciences was invited to the newly established College by the Government as its first principal. Similarly, Dr H.M. Jaffer and Dr H. Ahamed were also brought down from India to develop Unani system of medicine.

In 1961, the Ayurveda Act No. 31 of 1961 was enacted by repealing the Indigenous Medical Ordinance No. 17 of 1941 and the college was renamed as the Government College of Indigenous Medicine and came under the management of the College and Hospital Board. This was a step taken to uphold the quality of ayurveda healthcare delivery and the systems of education in Ayurveda, Unani and Siddha.

In 1977, the College of Indigenous Medicine was renamed as the Institute of Indigenous Medicine and affiliated to the University of Colombo under the University Act No. 1 of 1972. This was done by the Institute of Ayurveda Statute No. 1 of 1977, published in the Government Gazette Extraordinary bearing number 258 of March 30, 1977. The objective of this step was to produce qualified medical practitioners in the field of Ayurveda, Unani and Siddha medical systems. Institute of Indigenous Medicine Ordinance No. 7 of 1979 published in the Government Gazettee Extraordinary bearing No. 67/14 dated December 21, 1979, under the Universities Act No. 16 of 1978. With this enactment, the Siddha section was transferred and affiliated to the University of Jaffna.

The Faculty of Indigenous Medicine of the University of Colombo was established by an order of Gazette Extraordinary No 2319/22 – Wednesday, February 13, 2023, as the 10th Faculty of the University effective on 1 March 2023.

== Administration ==
The Senate of the University of Colombo, governs the academic matters of the institute. The Board of Management and the Departmental Committee of the institute are the responsible for administrative and academic matters.

== Academics ==
=== Undergraduate programs ===
- BAMS (Bachelor of Ayurveda Medicine and Surgery) – Duration 6 years(Including 5 year Academic studies and 01 year Internship )
- BUMS (Bachelor of Unani Medicine and Surgery) – Duration 6 years(Including 5 year Academic studies and 01 year Internship )

=== Postgraduate programs ===
- M.Phil. (Ayurveda)
- MD (AYU)- (Vachaspati)
- Postgraduate Diploma in Ayurveda
- Postgraduate Diploma in Unani

== Publications ==
The institute publishes the Sri Lanka Journal of Indigenous Medicine, a biannual peer-reviewed medical journal covering the traditional system of medicine, medicinal plants, Ayurvedic pharmaceutical science, etc.

== See also ==
- Sri Lankan traditional medicine
- University of Colombo
- Faculties and institutions of University of Colombo
- Education in Sri Lanka
- University Grants Commission (Sri Lanka)
- Medical school
- List of medical schools in Asia
- Ayurveda
- Alternative medicine
- Traditional medicine
- Charaka/Charaka Samhita
- Sushurata/Sushruta Samhita
