= Kikilimana =

- Location within Sri Lanka

Highest point
- Elevation: 2,240 m (7,350 ft)
- Coordinates: 6°59′06″N 80°44′48″E

Geography
- Location: Sri Lanka

Kikilimana (also spelt Kikiliyamana) is a mountain in the Central Province of Sri Lanka. At a summit elevation of 2,240 m (7,349 ft), it is the 6th tallest mountain in Sri Lanka, after Pidurutalagala (2,524 m), Kirigalpotta (2,395 m), Totapolakanda (2,357 m), Kudahagala (2,320 m), and Adam's Peak (2,243 m). The peak covers an extent of 4,858.6 hectares (12,006 acres).

== See also ==
- List of mountains of Sri Lanka
