= Gonmollikanda =

- adara kanda
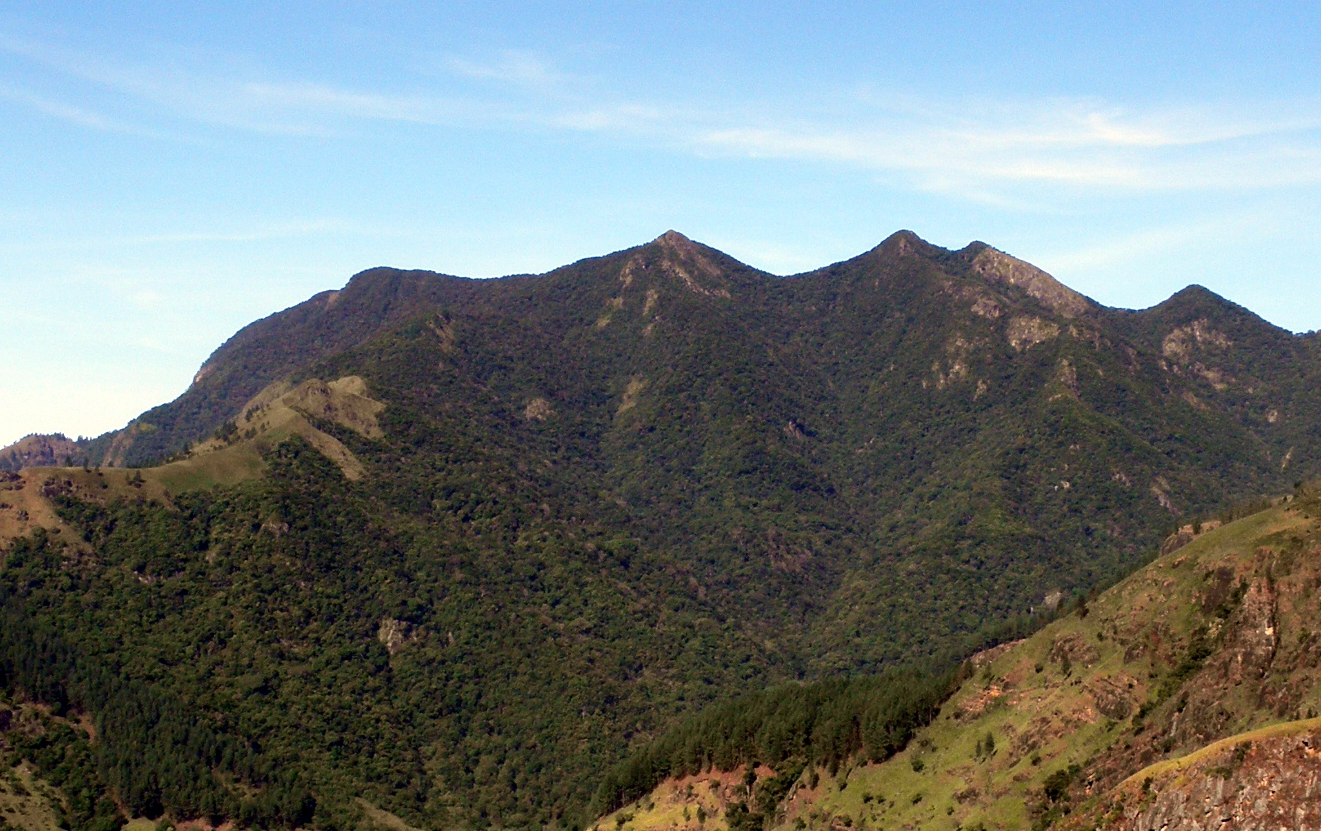
- Gonmollikanda and Balathoduwa as seen from Lower Ohiya.

Highest point
- Elevation: 2,034 m (6,673 ft)
- Coordinates: 6°46′00″N 80°48′33″E

Geography
- Location within Sri Lanka
- Location: Sri Lanka

Gonmollikanda is regarded as the 13th highest mountain in Sri Lanka situated at 2,034 m (6,673 ft) above mean sea level. The mountain got its name from the native language of Sri Lanka, Sinhala as the peak of the mountain has a shape of hump of a bull. In Sinhala 'Gommolliya' has the meaning of 'Hump of the bull'. Another popular mountain peak named Balathoduwa is also situated close to Gommolli Kanda. These two mountain peaks are visible from World's End of Horton Plains National Park on a clear day without heavy mist. Sri Lanka's highest waterfall, Bambarakanda Falls, is also situated close to Gommolli Kanda.

== See also ==
- Geography of Sri Lanka
- List of mountains in Sri Lanka
