= One Tree (disambiguation) =

One Tree may refer to:

- One Tree, New South Wales, a location on the Cobb Highway on the flat plain between Hay and Booligal in the Riverina district of New South Wales, Australia
- The One Tree, a fantasy novel by American writer Stephen R. Donaldson

== See also ==
- One Tree Hill (disambiguation)
- One Tree Hill (TV series), American TV series
