= Mahakudagala =

Mountain in Sri Lanka

- Location within Sri Lanka

Highest point
- Elevation: 2,100 m (6,900 ft)
- Coordinates: 7°02′35″N 80°50′40″E

Geography
- Location: Sri Lanka

Mahakudagala is a mountain in the Nuwara Eliya District of Sri Lanka. It is located approximately 11 kilometres (7 mi) north east of Nuwara Eliya and with a summit elevation of 2,100 m (6,890 ft), it is the 10th tallest mountain in Sri Lanka together with One Tree Hill.

Mahakudagala forms part of the Narangala mountain range and is one of the range's eastern spurs.

== See also ==
- List of mountains of Sri Lanka
