= Kirigalpoththa =

Mountain in Sri Lanka

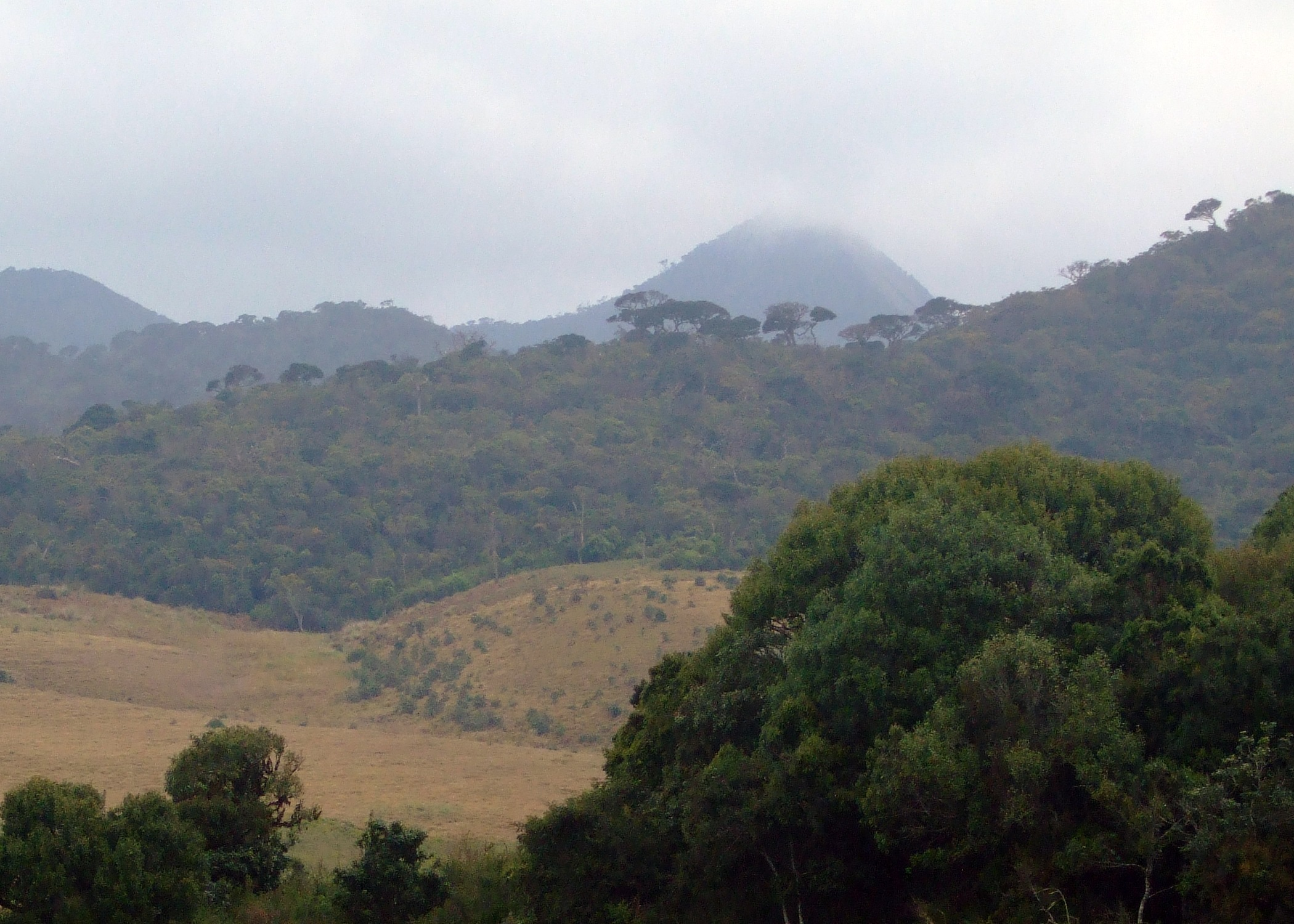
- The mountain as seen from the entrance of the Horton Plains National Park.

Highest point
- Elevation: 2,395 m (7,858 ft)
- Coordinates: 6°47′57″N 80°46′00″E

Geography
- Location within Sri Lanka
- Location: Sri Lanka

Kirigalpoththa is the second-tallest mountain in Sri Lanka at 2,388 m (7,835 ft) above mean sea level, and is also the highest mountain in the country whose summit is accessible to the general public (the highest point, Pidurutalagala, is occupied by a military base and off-limits to the public). The peak is situated near the city of Nuwara Eliya, within the Nuwara Eliya District. Only one seven-kilometre (4 1/2-mile) hiking trail provides access to the mountain's summit via the Horton Plains National Park, although the trail is not very popular.

== See also ==
- Geography of Sri Lanka
- List of mountains in Sri Lanka
