= Hakgala =

Mountain in Sri Lanka

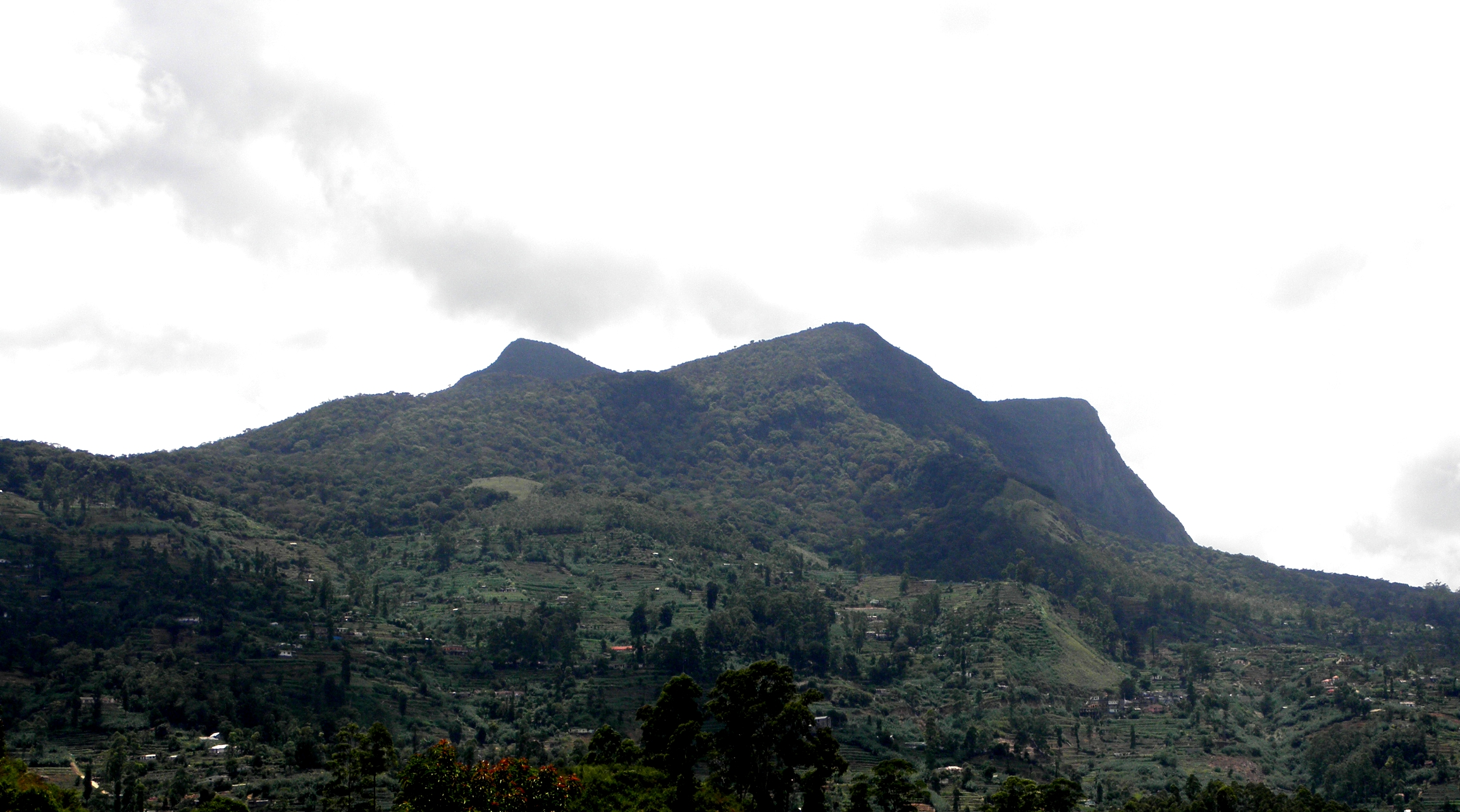
- Mountain as seen from the Nuwara Eliya – Badulla highway.

Highest point
- Elevation: 2,170 m (7,120 ft)
- Coordinates: 6°55′01″N 80°48′50″E

Geography
- Location within Sri Lanka
- Location: Sri Lanka

Hakgala is a mountain situated in the Nuwara Eliya district of Sri Lanka at 2,169 m (7,116 ft) above mean sea level, most parts of the mountain are covered with forest belonging to Hakgala Strict Nature Reserve. Hakgala Botanical Garden is situated on the northeastern slope of the Hakgala Mountain. The southwestern side of the mountain has a wet climate compared to the northeastern slope since the southwestern part faces directly to the southwest Monsoon.

According to the native language of Sri Lanka – Sinhala, the name of the mountain hakgala’ has the meaning of jaw-rock. Jaw rock is related to a story in the epic Ramayana. According to the legend, Hanuman the Monkey God had been sent by Rama to the Himalayas to find a particular medical herb to rescue Sita from the demon king Ravana. When Hanuman arrived at the Himalayas he had forgotten which herb he was looking for and he had decided to bring a chunk of the Himalayas back in his jaw, hoping that particular herb was growing on it. Legend says that Hakgala Mountain was formed by the chunk of rock brought from the Himalayas by Hanuman.

== See also ==
- Geography of Sri Lanka
- List of mountains in Sri Lanka
