= Conical Hill (Sri Lanka) =

- Location within Sri Lanka

Highest point
- Elevation: 2,166 m (7,106 ft)
- Coordinates: 6°54′45″N 80°46′33″E

Geography
- Location: Sri Lanka

Conical Hill is a 2,166-metre-high (7,106 ft) mountain situated in the Nuwara Eliya District of Sri Lanka. It is the 9th highest mountain in Sri Lanka.

== See also ==
- List of mountains of Sri Lanka
