= One Tree Hill =

One Tree Hill may refer to:

- "One Tree Hill" (song), a 1987 song by U2 referencing One Tree Hill, New Zealand volcanic peak
- One Tree Hill (TV series), a 2003–2012 American drama series named for the U2 song
  - One Tree Hill (soundtrack), a 2005 soundtrack album from the series

== Places ==
=== Australia ===
- One Tree Hill (Australian Capital Territory), a peak on the ACT-NSW border, near Hall
- One Tree Hill (Blue Mountains), a peak at Mount Victoria in the Blue Mountains of New South Wales
- One Tree Hill, Ferntree Gully in the Dandenong Ranges National Park, Victoria
- One Tree Hill, South Australia, a suburb on the northern outskirts of Adelaide, South Australia
- One Tree Hill, former name of Mount Coot-tha, Queensland, in Brisbane
- One Tree Hill, former name of Table Top Mountain near Toowoomba, Queensland
  - Site of the Battle of One Tree Hill (1843), Queensland

=== India ===
- One Tree Hill Point, a location in Matheran Hill Station near Mumbai

=== New Zealand ===
- Maungakiekie / One Tree Hill, a volcanic peak in Auckland
- One Tree Hill, New Zealand, a suburb in Auckland at the base of the volcanic peak
- One Tree Hill College, Auckland

=== Sri Lanka ===
- One Tree Hill, Sri Lanka, a hill in the Nuwara Eliya District

=== United Kingdom ===
- One Tree Hill Country Park in Basildon, Essex
- One Tree Hill, Honor Oak, in London

== Other ==
- One Tree Hill, a codename of the Mozilla Firefox 0.9 release

== See also ==
- Tree Hill (disambiguation)
