= Kudahagala =

- Agrabopath

Highest point
- Elevation: 2,320 m (7,610 ft)
- Coordinates: 6°48′47″N 80°46′59″E

Geography
- Location: Sri Lanka

Kudahagala (also known as Agrabopath or Agra Bopath) is a 2,320-metre-high (7,612 ft) mountain situated in Sri Lanka. It is the 4th tallest in the country.

== See also ==
- List of mountains of Sri Lanka
