= Tree Hill =

Tree Hill may refer to:

- Tree Hill, a fictional town in North Carolina where the One Tree Hill series is based
- Tree Hill Nature Center, non-profit organization and wilderness preserve in Jacksonville, Florida
- Tree Hill (Richmond, Virginia), a Greek Revival style plantation house overlooking the James River in Henrico County, Virginia

== See also ==
- One Tree Hill (New Zealand), aka Maungakiekie, volcanic peak in Auckland, New Zealand
- One Tree Hill (disambiguation)
