= Totapolakanda =

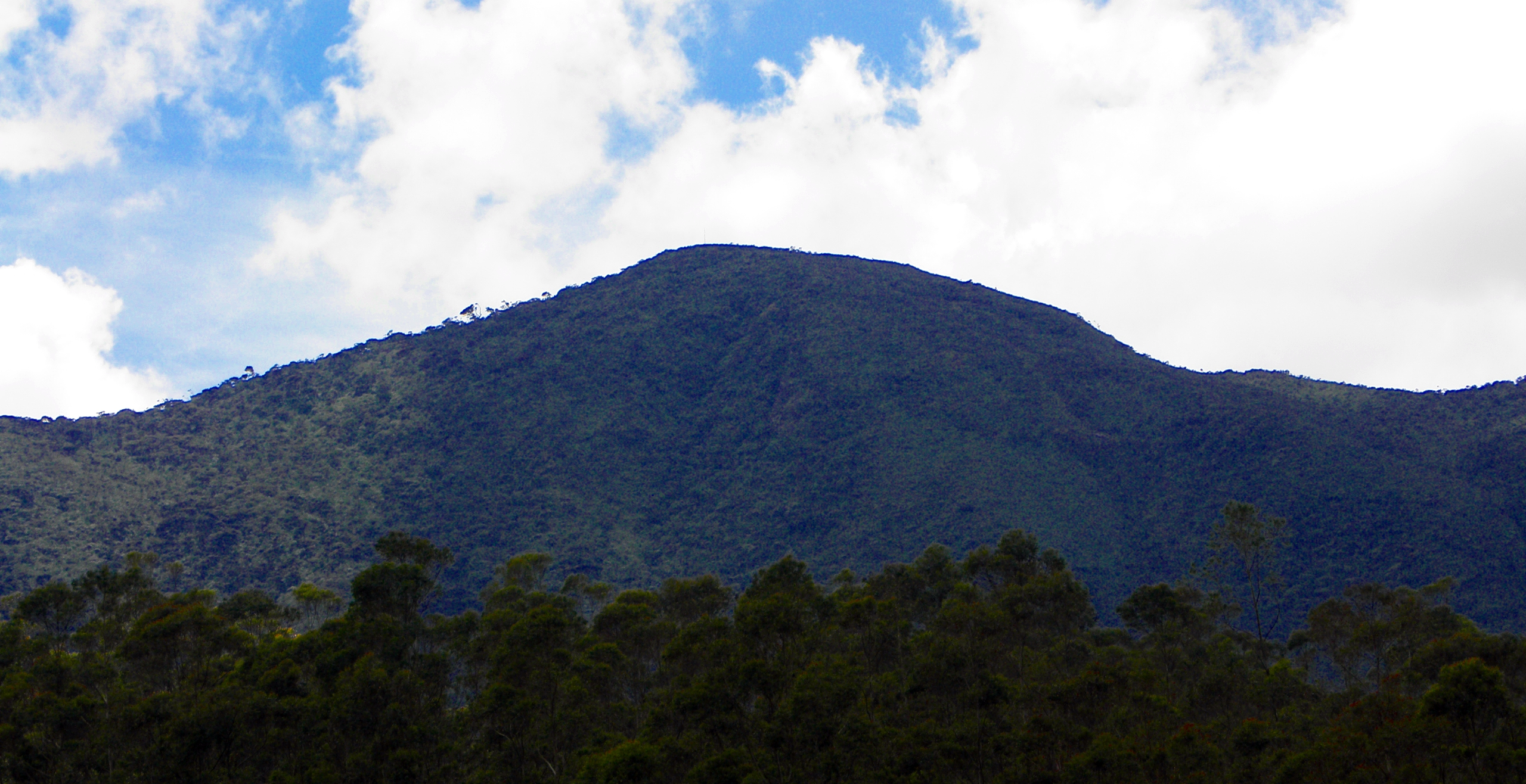
- Totapolakanda as seen from Pattipola railway station

Highest point
- Elevation: 2,357 m (7,733 ft)
- Coordinates: 6°49′59″N 80°49′11″E

Geography
- Location within Sri Lanka
- Location: Sri Lanka

Totapolakanda (also Thotupolakanda or Thotupola Kanda), is the third highest mountain in Sri Lanka situated in Nuwara Eliya district 2,357 m (7,733 ft) above mean sea level. The mountain is located within the Horton Plains National Park. A trail to the top of the mountain, about two kilometres long, starts a few metres away from the Pattipola entrance to the Horton Plains National Park. Most parts of the mountain surface is covered with shrubs adapted to the cool and windy climate of Horton Plains National Park. Strobilanthes, Osbeckia and Rhodomyrtus species grown as shrubs are common among them.

== Legend ==
Totapolakanda has the meaning of ‘Landing Site’ in Sinhala language which related to a legend of Rama and Ravana. According to the legend, King of India, Rama and his beautiful wife Sita lived in exile in the jungle. Once Ravana kidnapped Rama’s wife Sita and escaped to Sri Lanka. On the way to Sri Lanka plane first landed in Totapolakanda which has the meaning of landing site.

== See also ==
- Geography of Sri Lanka
- List of mountains in Sri Lanka
