= List of mountains of Sri Lanka =

Mountains of Sri Lanka (interactive map)

The following page lists the mountain peaks of Sri Lanka. The following list comprises mountains that have been thoroughly explored, with their altitudes measured by expert hikers in Sri Lanka. The classification of a separate mountain is determined by the distance between two peaks and the elevation difference between them. Consequently, all the mountains listed below are identified as distinct summits, with any summits within a single mountain range excluded.

Sri Lanka boasts over 1,200 identified mountains, predominantly located in the Central Province, Sri Lanka. This province features three major forest reserves with significant mountain clusters: Knuckles Mountain Range, Pidurutalagala Forest Reserve, Horton Plains National Park, and Peak Wilderness Sanctuary. Additionally, another notable cluster is found in the Namunukula area of the Uva Province. These major forest reserves contain numerous mountains that can be distinctly identified as separate summits within their respective clusters.

The Knuckles Forest Reserve, Peak Wilderness Sanctuary, and Piduruthalagala Forest Reserves encompass distinct summits with challenging hikes that often take years to complete in their entirety. Horton Plains National Park, on the other hand, has four major mountains with identifiable separate peaks, each offering moderate hikes requiring an ascent of approximately 200–300 meters from the main road.

The most arduous mountain hikes are located in the Peak Wilderness Sanctuary, home to elephants and leopards. The dense forest and unpredictable weather conditions contribute to the extreme difficulty and potential danger of these hikes.

The following list is intended for dedicated hikers who aim to explore mountains using GPS systems, as many of these mountains lack established footpaths or clear trails. Hikers are advised to obtain necessary permissions from the Department of Wildlife Conservation (Sri Lanka) before embarking on their hikes.

== Mountains ==
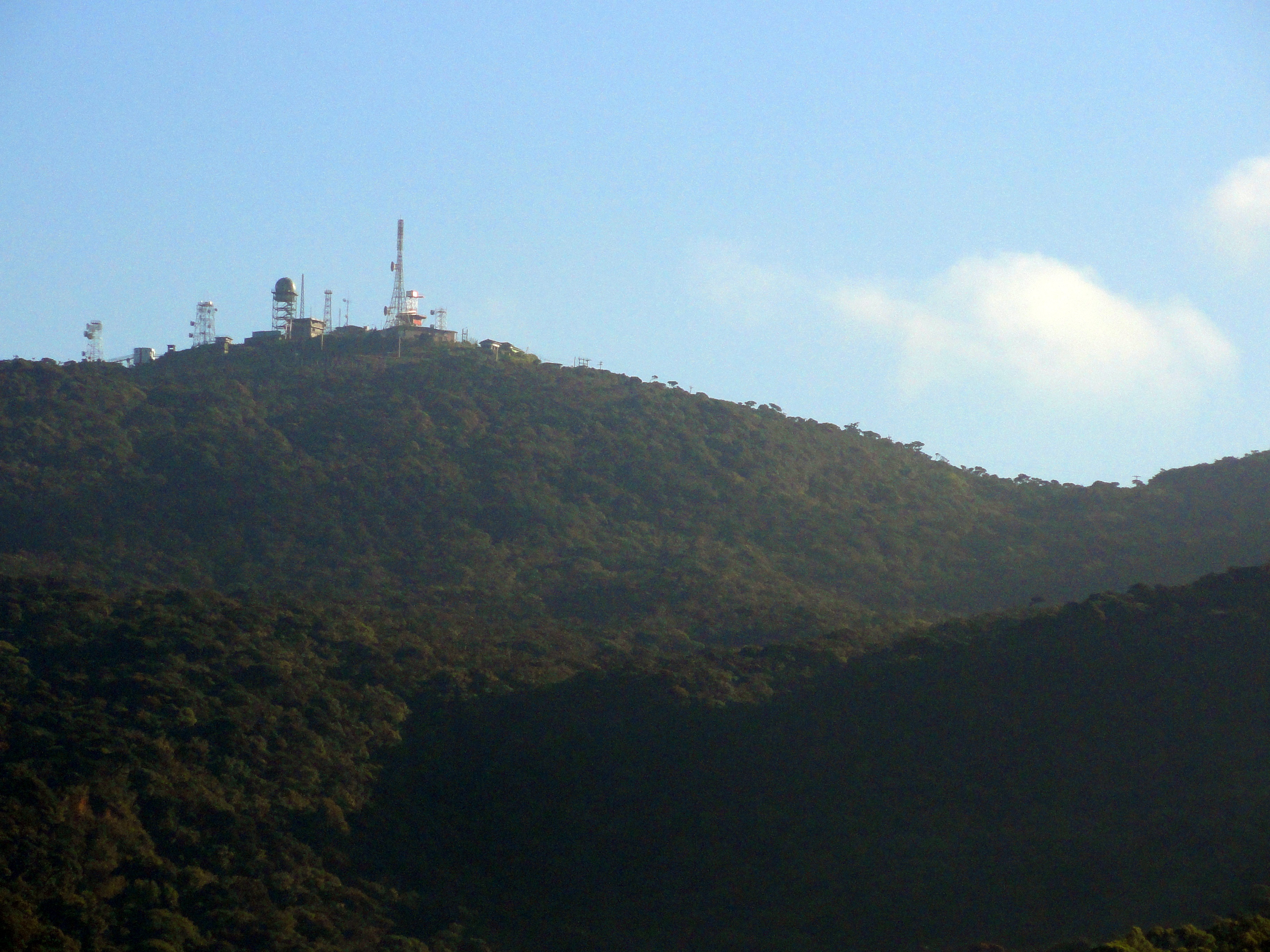
Pidurutalagala, the tallest mountain in Sri Lanka at 2,524 m (8,281 ft). The military facility atop the summit is visible in this image.

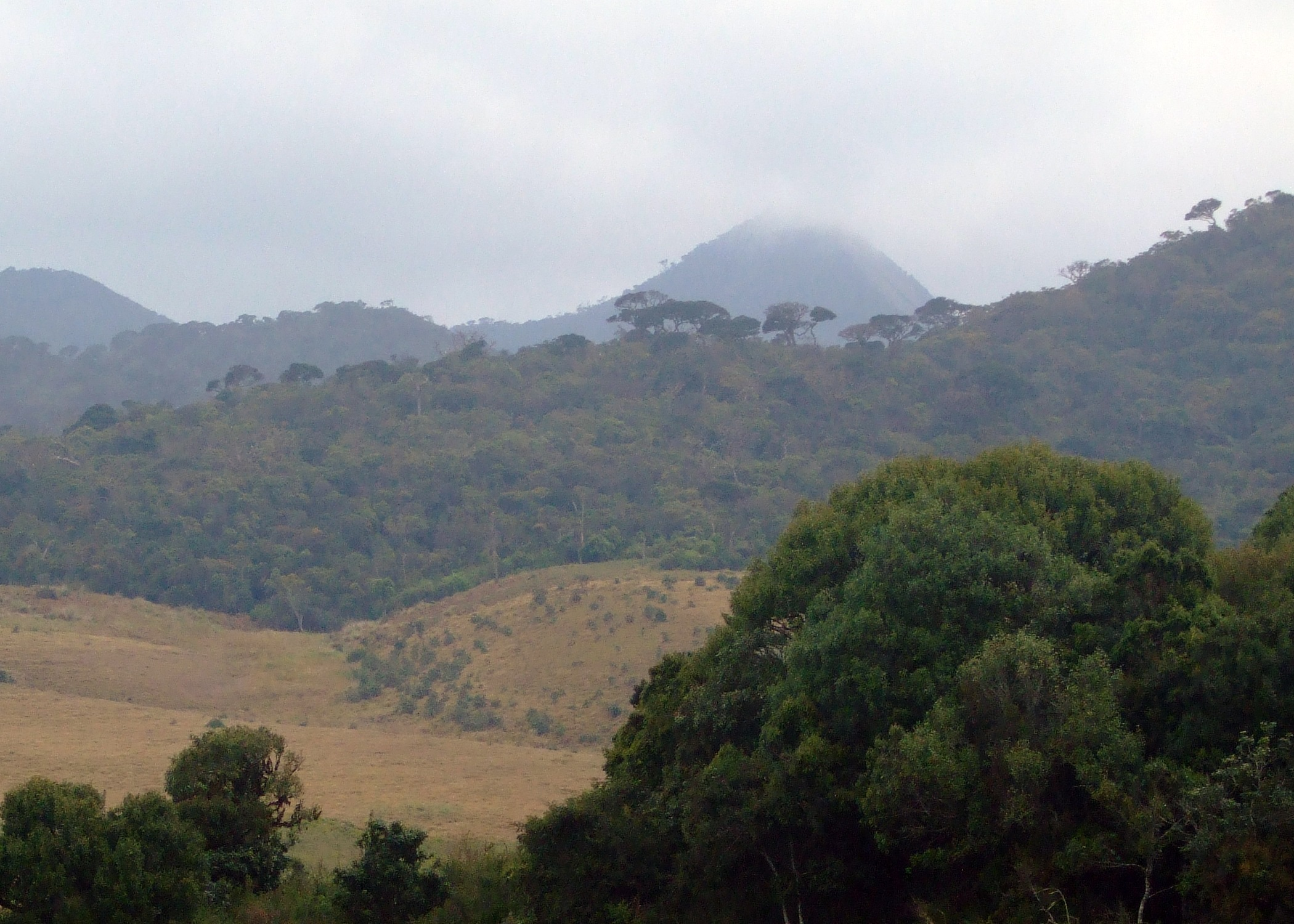
Kirigalpotta, the 2nd tallest mountain.

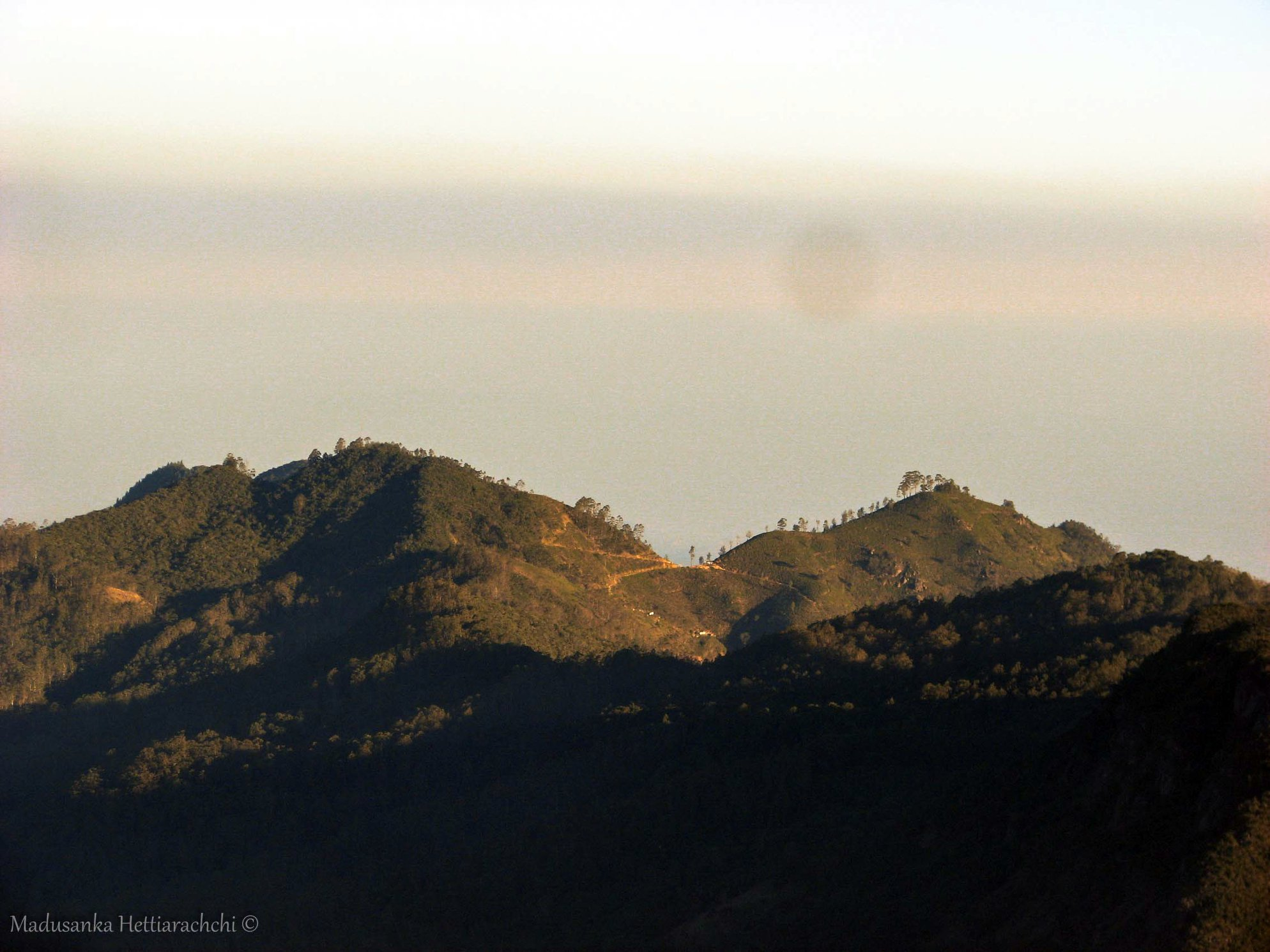
Udaweriya and Meeriyathenna, the 29th and 36th tallest mountain.

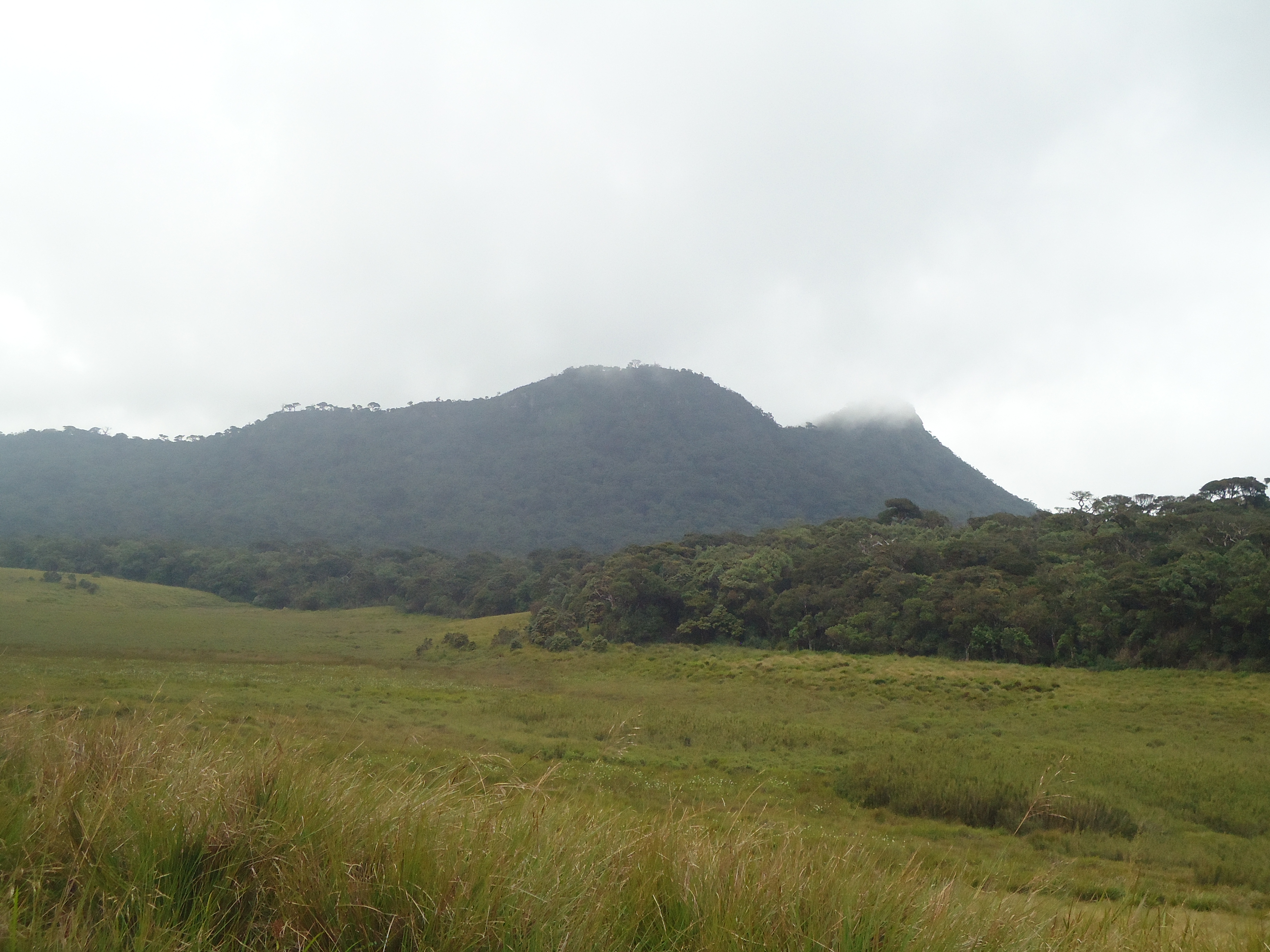
Agrabopath, the 5th tallest mountain.

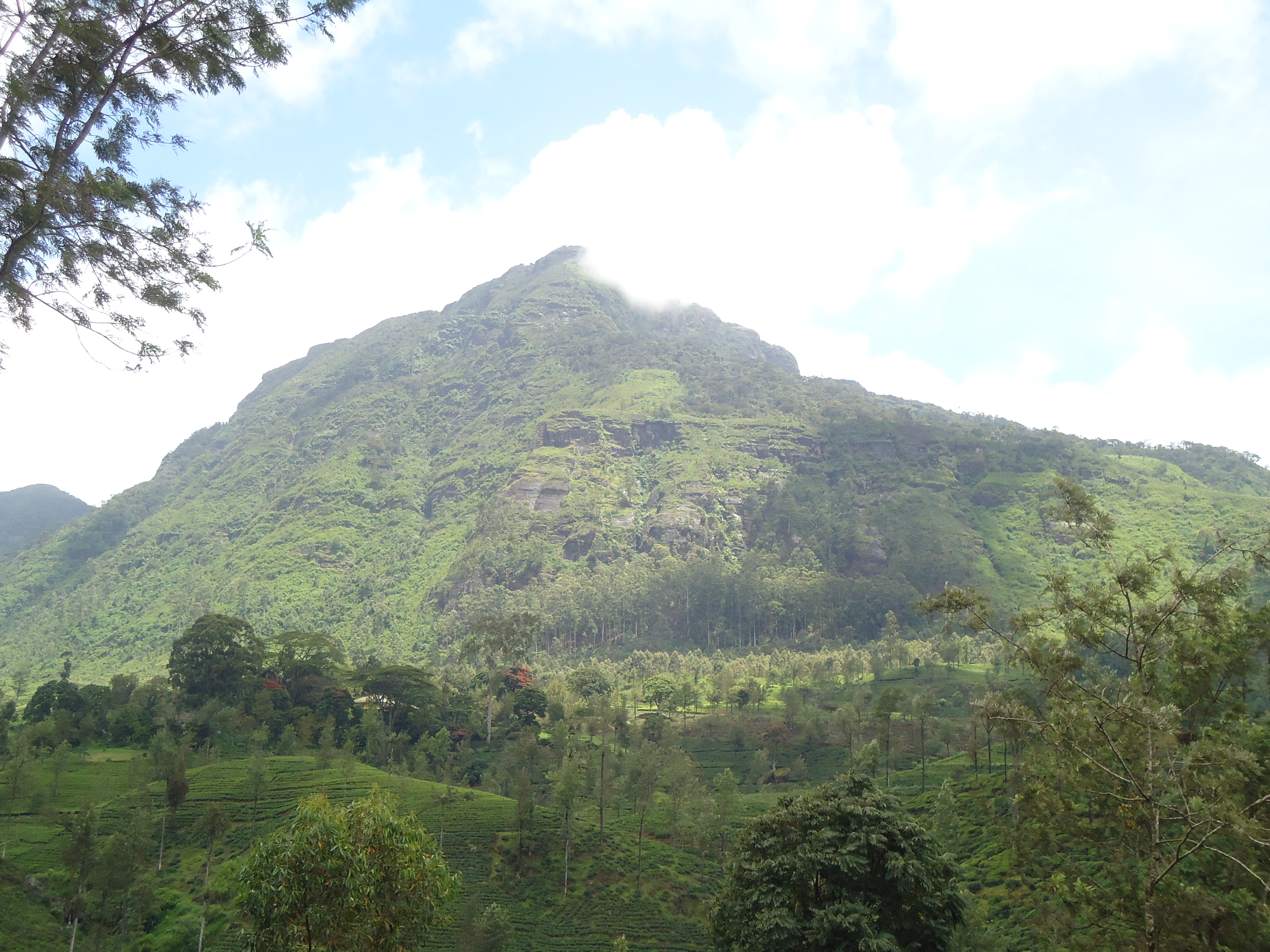
Great Western Mountain, the 11th highest mountain in Sri Lanka.

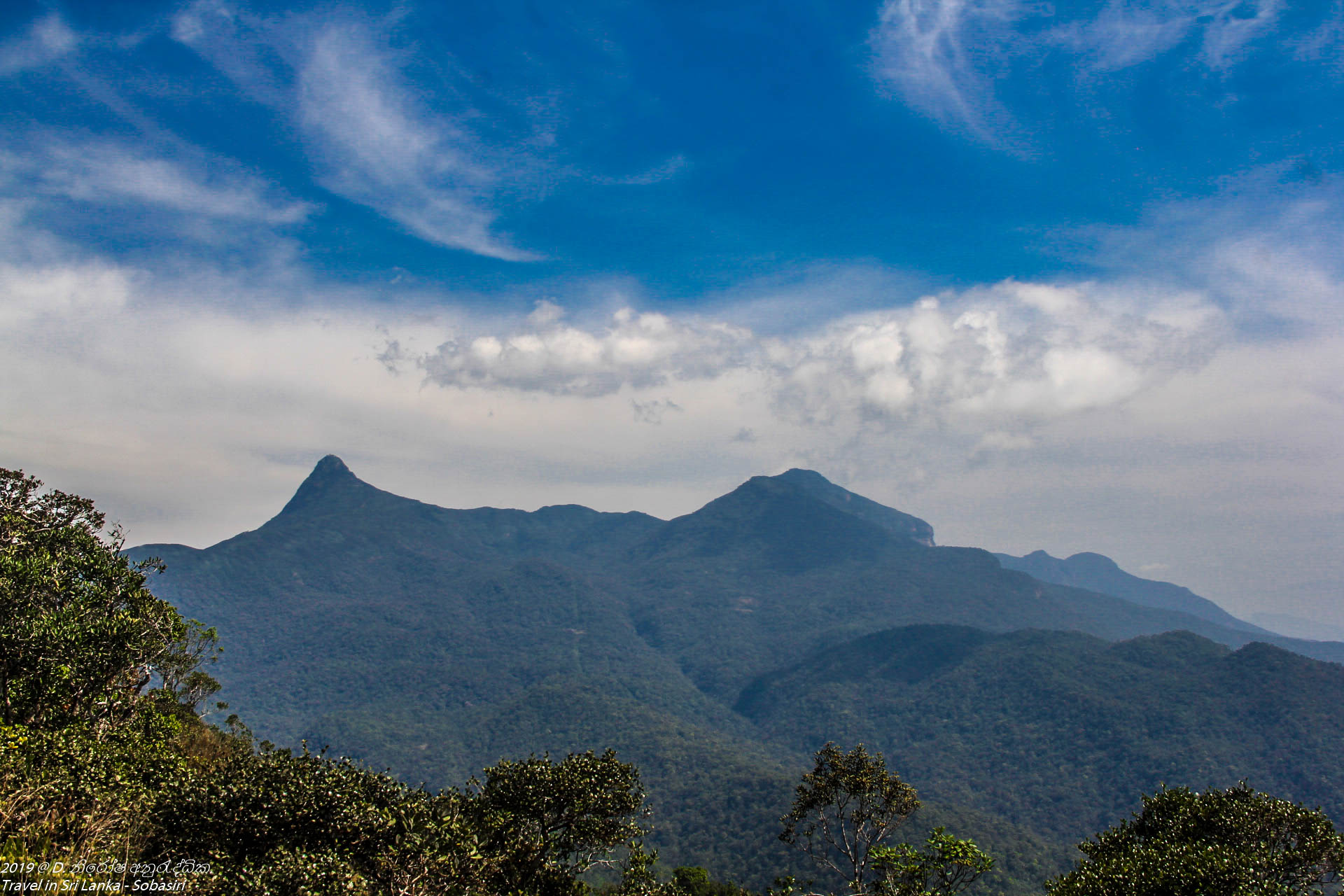
Sripada and Bena Samanala Mountains, The holy mountains at Samanala Forest Reserve.

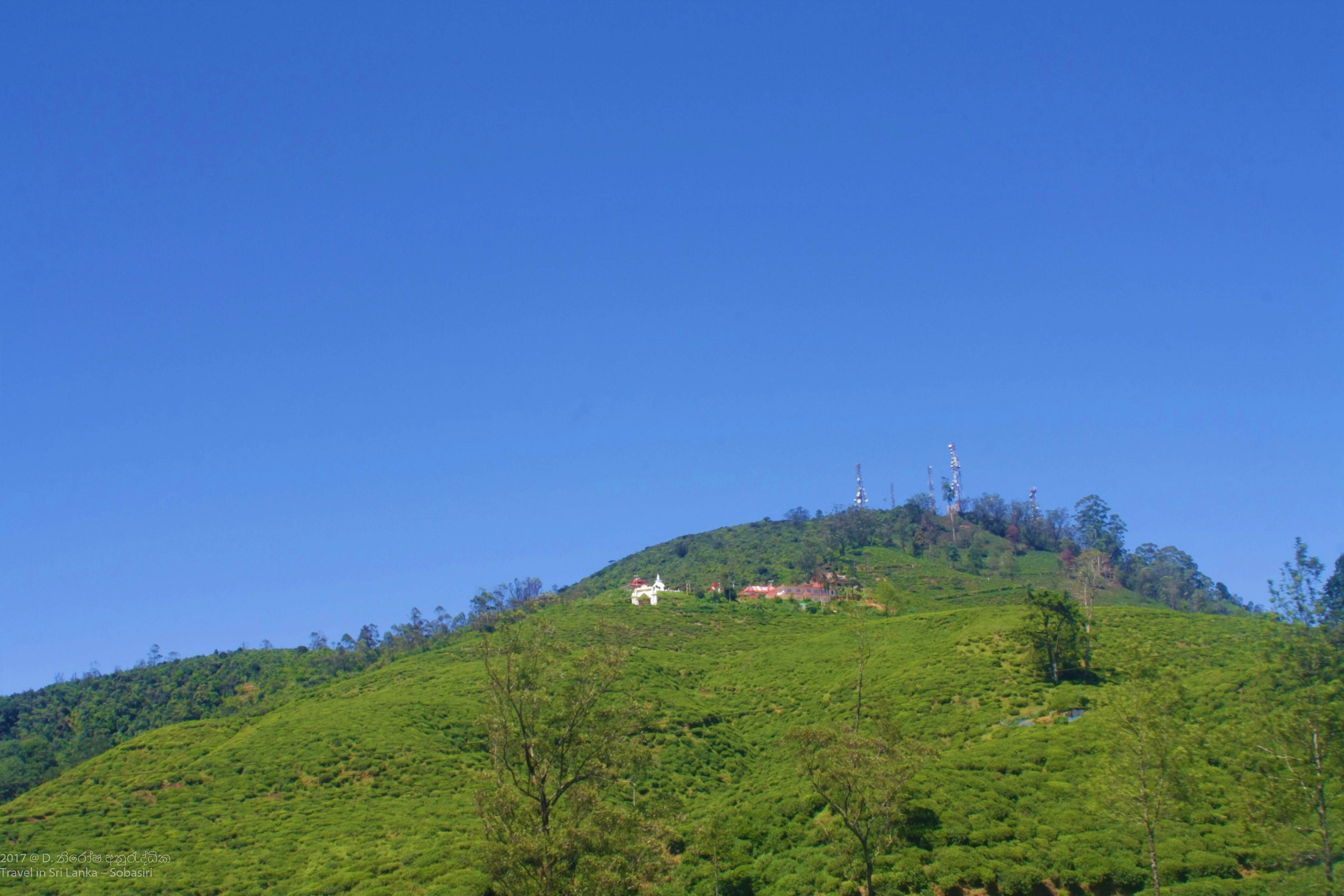
Single Tree Hill, Single Tree Hill and its temple at the top of the mountain.

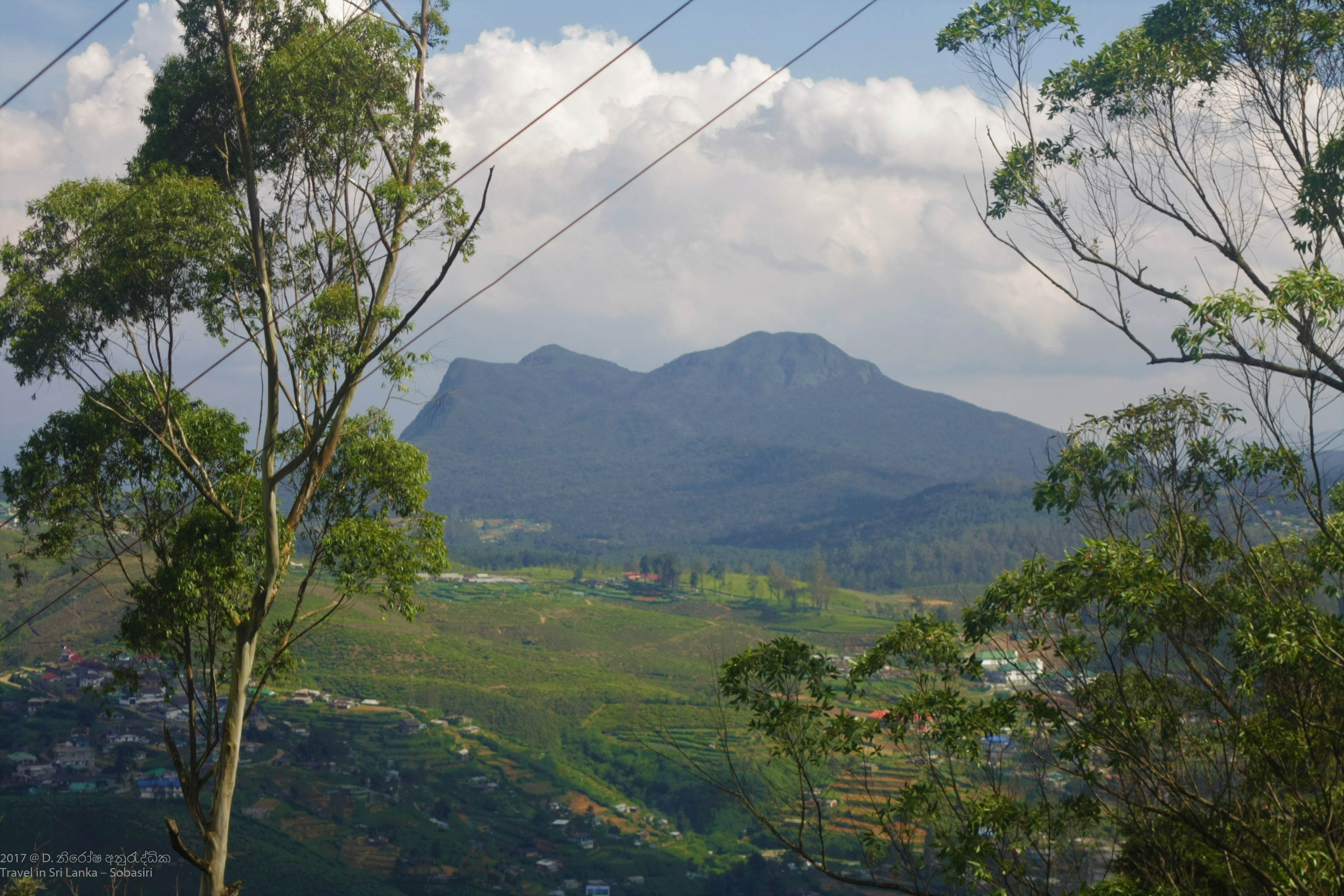
Hakgala Mountain, Three peaks of Hakgala Mountain.

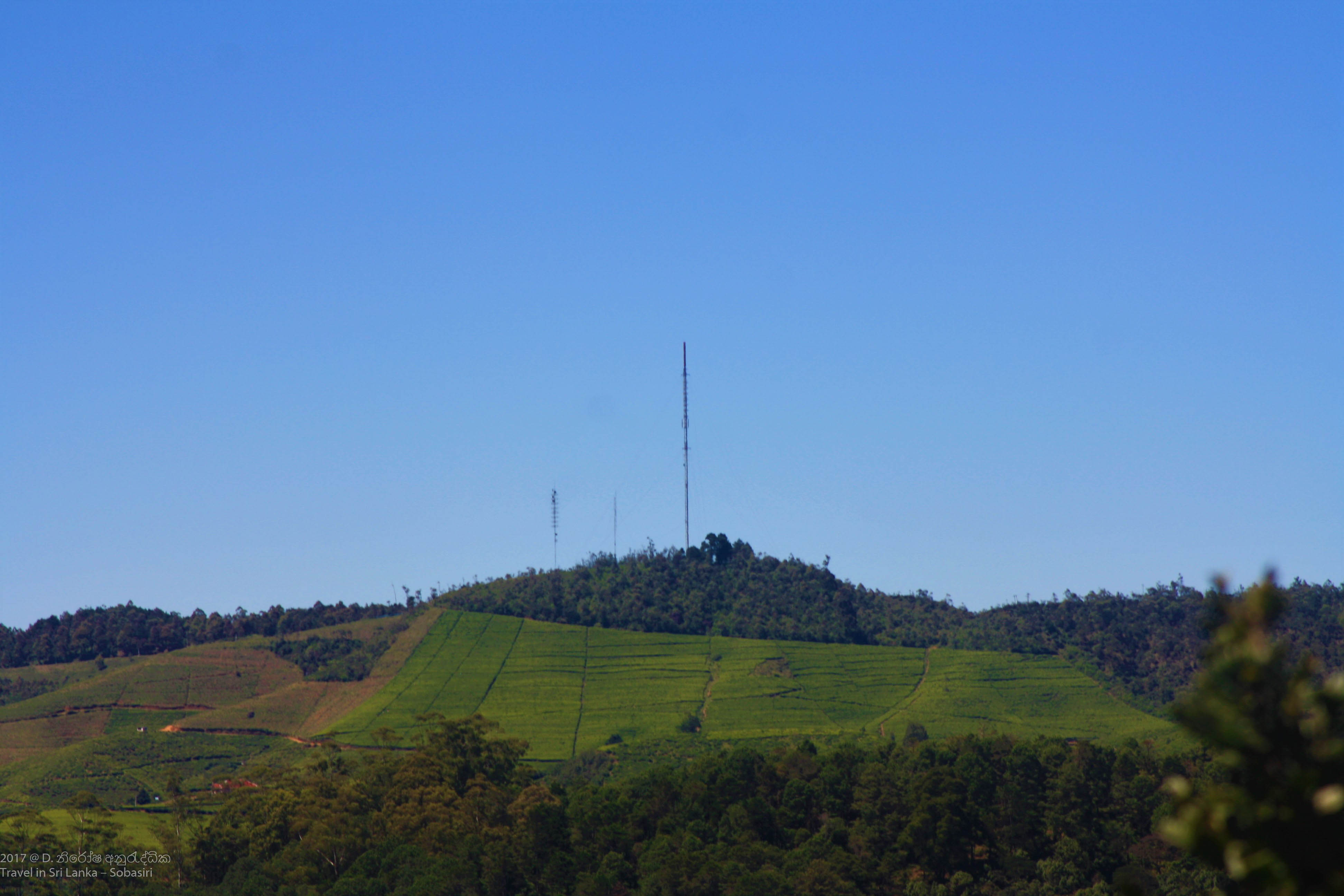
Mount Oliphant, Mount Oliphant front and Uda Radella behind

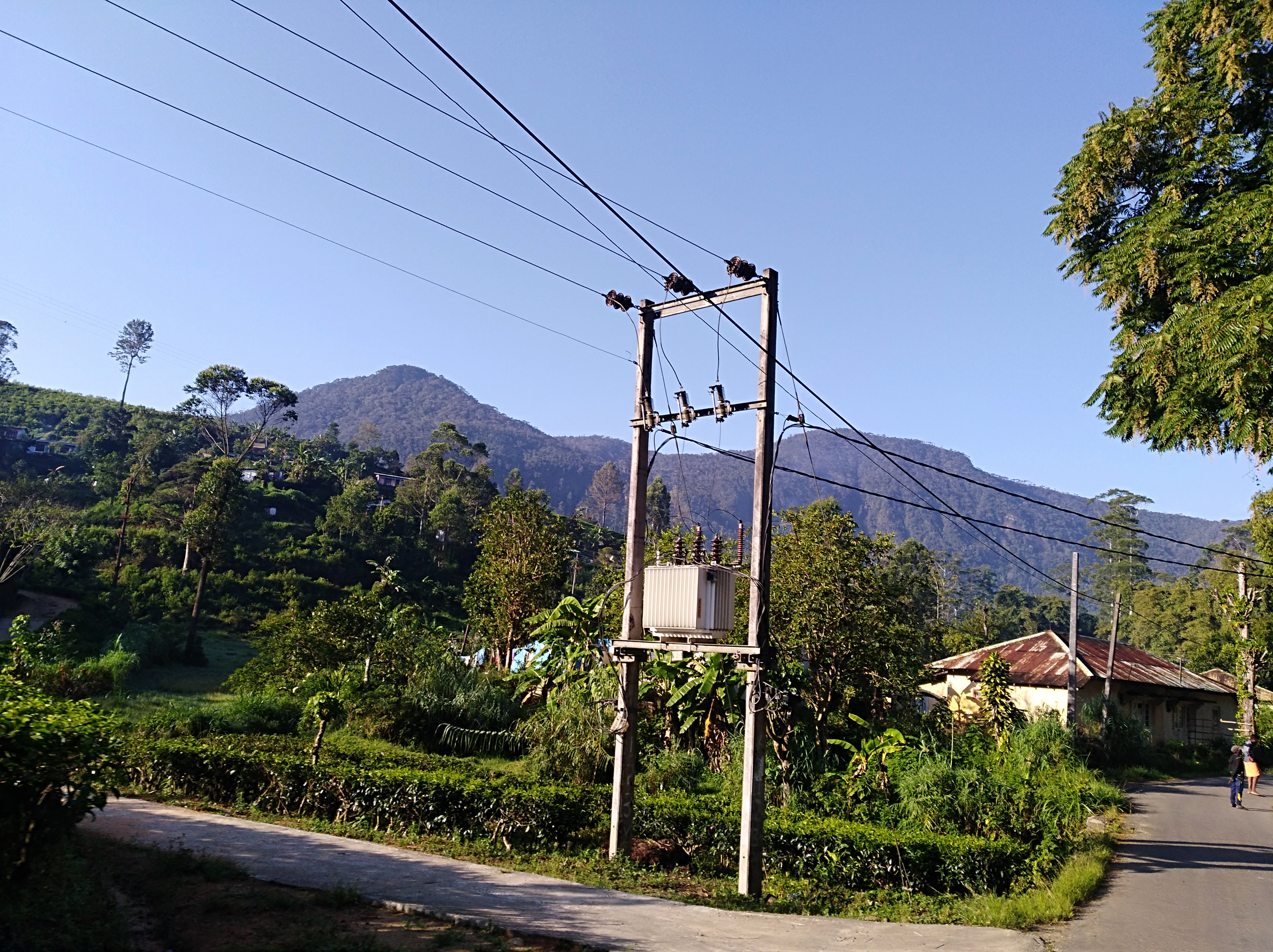
Mahamuni Mountain, Mahamuni Kanda seen at Strathsphy Estate.

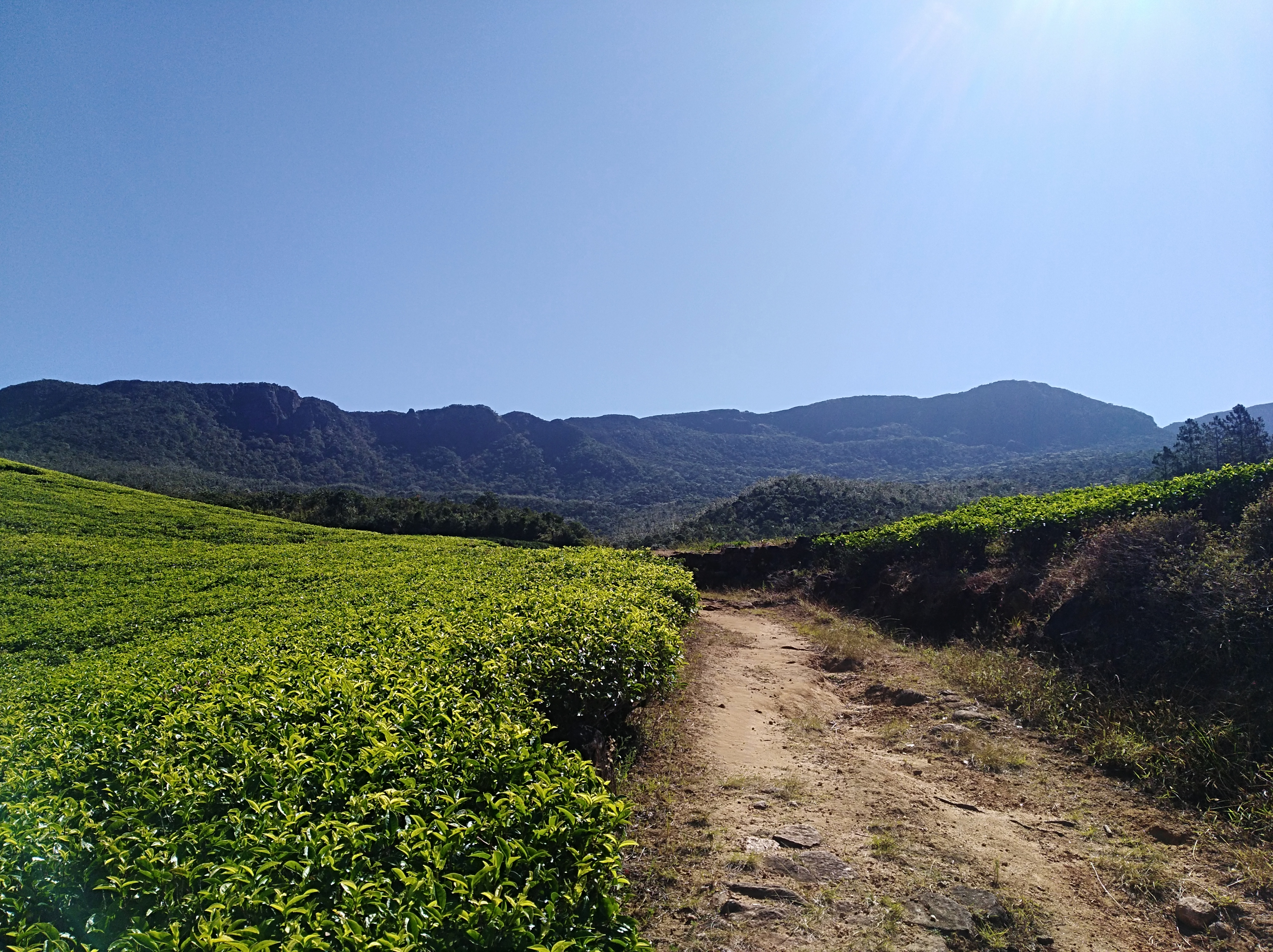
Perettasi Mountain, This is the view of the giant Perettasi Mountain, summit point located at the right area.

Rank	Mountain	District	Province	Summit		Location	Ref
Rank	Mountain	District	Province	m	ft	Location	Ref
1	Pidurutalagala	Nuwara Eliya	Central	2,524	8,281	07°00′03″N 80°46′26″E	
2	Kirigalpotta	Nuwara Eliya	Central	2,395	7,858	06°47′57″N 80°46′00″E	
3	Top Pass Hill	Nuwara Eliya	Central	2,383	7,818	07°00′27″N 80°45′30″E	
4	Thotupola Kanda	Nuwara Eliya	Central	2,359	7,740	06°49′59″N 80°49′11″E	
5	Ramboda Hill	Nuwara Eliya	Central	2,322	7,618	07°00′58″N 80°45′12″E	
6	Agrabopath	Nuwara Eliya	Central	2,318	7,605	06°48′47″N 80°46′59″E	
7	Leopards Rock	Nuwara Eliya	Central	2,284	7,493	06°59′29″N 80°45′41″E	
8	Adam's Peak	Ratnapura	Sabaragamuwa	2,243	7,359	06°48′34″N 80°29′59″E	
9	Kikilimana	Nuwara Eliya	Central	2,240	7,349	06°59′06″N 80°44′48″E	
10	Court's Lodge Point	Nuwara Eliya	Central	2,235	7,333	06°59′10″N 80°47′37″E	
11	Great Western Mountain	Nuwara Eliya	Central	2,216	7,270	06°58′00″N 80°41′38″E	
12	Pattipola Mountain	Nuwara Eliya	Central	2,208	7,244	06°51′07″N 80°48′06″E	
13	World's End Rock	Nuwara Eliya	Central	2,202	7,224	06°46′27″N 80°46′56″E	
14	Mount Oliphant	Nuwara Eliya	Central	2,190	7,185	06°58′26″N 80°44′07″E	
15	Hakgala	Nuwara Eliya	Central	2,172	7,126	06°55′05″N 80°48′43″E	
16	Conical Hill	Nuwara Eliya	Central	2,168	7,113	06°54′45″N 80°46′33″E	
17	Kabaragala Summit	Nuwara Eliya	Central	2,162	7,093	07°01′38.8″N 80°44′18.4″E	
18	Park Green Mountain	Nuwara Eliya	Central	2,149	7,051	07°00′49″N 80°48′57″E	
19	Uda Radella	Nuwara Eliya	Central	2,143	7,031	06°57′45″N 80°43′32″E	
20	Haddon Hill	Nuwara Eliya	Central	2,131	6,991	06°58′02″N 80°45′13″E	
21	Perettasi Mountain	Nuwara Eliya	Central	2,129	6,985	07°04′34″N 80°44′00″E	
22	North Cove Mountain	Nuwara Eliya	Central	2,119	6,952	06°47′31.3″N 80°44′47.7″E	
23	New Zealand Farm Mountain	Nuwara Eliya	Central	2,108	6,916	06°51′32″N 80°47′36″E	
24	One Tree Hill	Nuwara Eliya	Central	2,100	6,890	06°57′27″N 80°45′45″E	
25	Mahakudagala	Nuwara Eliya	Central	2,100	6,890	07°02′35″N 80°50′40″E	
26	Kandapola Kanda	Nuwara Eliya	Central	2,088	6,850	06°58′44″N 80°49′30″E	
27	Frotoft Hill	Nuwara Eliya	Central	2,082	6,831	07°05′26.7″N 80°43′26.3″E	
28	Udaweriya	Badulla	Uva	2,079	6,821	06°47′40″N 80°51′55″E	
29	Waterfall Point	Nuwara Eliya	Central	2,076	6,811	06°55′40″N 80°45′52″E	
30	Robgill Hill	Nuwara Eliya	Central	2,072	6,798	06°49′51″N 80°41′06″E	
31	Mahamuni Kanda	Nuwara Eliya	Central	2,069	6,788	06°45′48″N 80°35′14″E	
32	North Bogawanthalawa Peak	Nuwara Eliya	Central	2,055	6,742	06°46′09″N 80°39′32″E	
33	Deegalhinna	Nuwara Eliya	Central	2,045	6,709	07°02′50″N 80°44′38.5″E	
34	Kuraatte Kanda	Nuwara Eliya	Central	2,039	6,690	06°59′08″N 80°50′58″E	
35	Namunukula	Badulla	Uva	2,036	6,680	06°55′59″N 81°06′49″E	
36	Gommoliya	Ratnapura	Sabaragamuwa	2,034	6,673	06°46′00″N 80°48′33″E	
37	Meeriyathenna	Badulla	Uva	2,034	6,673	06°47′18″N 81°51′48″E	
38	Elbedda	Nuwara Eliya	Central	2,016	6,614	06°50′50″N 80°39′53″E	
39	Balathuduwa	Badulla	Uva	2,012	6,601	06°45′41″N 80°48′45″E	
40	Bena Samanalagala	Nuwara Eliya	Central	2,010	6,594	06°47′54″N 80°29′18″E	
