= Great Western Mountain =

Mountain in Sri Lanka

- Location within Sri Lanka

Highest point
- Elevation: 2,216 m (7,270 ft)
- Coordinates: 6°58′00″N 80°41′38″E

Great Western Mountain is the 8th highest mountain in Sri Lanka. It is located in Nuwara Eliya District. Its trail is ranked as difficult due to its steep incline and difficult, unclear path.
