= Pidurutalagala =

Highest mountain in Sri Lanka

- Mount Pedro
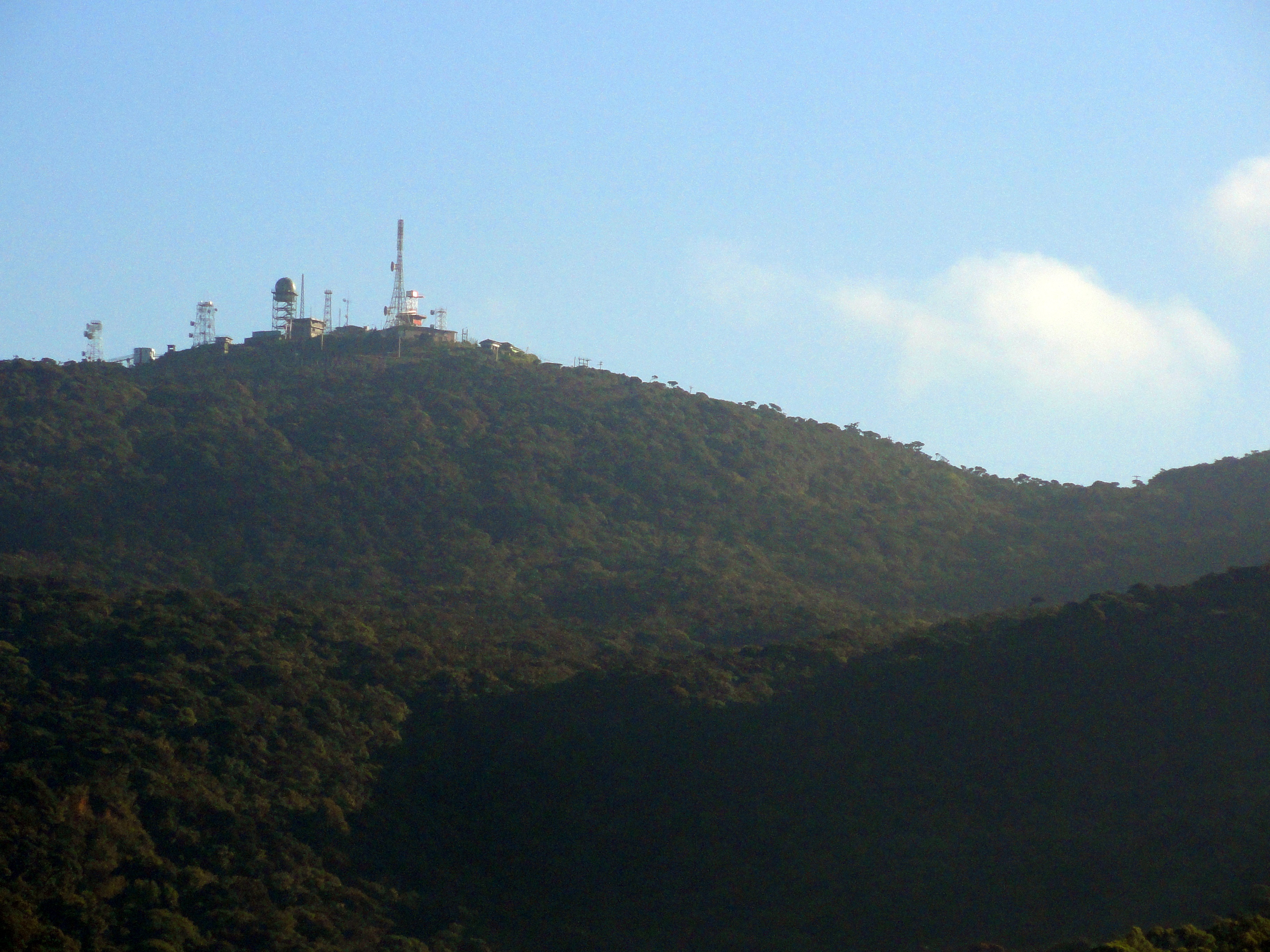
- Pidurutalagala with radio equipment at the summit of the mountain

Highest point
- Elevation: 2,524 m (8,281 ft)
- Prominence: 2,524 m (8,281 ft)
- Listing: Country high point; Island high point 41st; Ultra, Ribu
- Coordinates: 7°00′03″N 80°46′26″E

Geography
- Location within Sri Lanka
- Location: Sri Lanka
- Parent range: Pidurutalagala

Pidurutalagala (Sinhala: පිදුරුතලාගල, pronounced [ˌpidurutaˈlaːɡələ], Straw Plateau Rock), or previously Mount Pedro in English, is the highest mountain in Sri Lanka, at 2,524 m (8,281 ft). It is situated North-North-East from the town of Nuwara Eliya and is easily visible from most areas of the Central Province.

Its summit is home to the central communications array of the Government of Sri Lanka and armed forces and serves as an important point in the country's radar system. The peak is currently designated as an "ultra-high security zone", and protected by a large military base; the peak is strictly off-limits to the general public.

On 1 March 2010, a small wildfire broke out over the mountain's forest cover. The fire destroyed 1.2 hectares (3 acres) of forest, before being doused by the Sri Lanka Air Force and nearly 300 local residents.

== See also ==
- Geography of Sri Lanka
- List of mountains of Sri Lanka
- List of ultras of Tibet, East Asia and neighbouring areas
- Extreme points of Sri Lanka
- List of elevation extremes by country
