= One Tree Hill (Sri Lanka) =

Mountain in Sri Lanka

- Location within Sri Lanka

Highest point
- Elevation: 2,100 m (6,900 ft)
- Coordinates: 6°57′28″N 80°45′45″E

Geography
- Location: Sri Lanka

One Tree Hill (sometimes also called Single Tree Hill) is a 2,100-metre-high (6,890 ft) mountain situated in the Nuwara Eliya District of Sri Lanka. It is the 10th highest mountain in Sri Lanka.

== See also ==
- List of mountains of Sri Lanka
