= Geography of Sri Lanka =

Geographical overview

Sri Lanka
Native name: Nickname: Pearl of the Indian Ocean

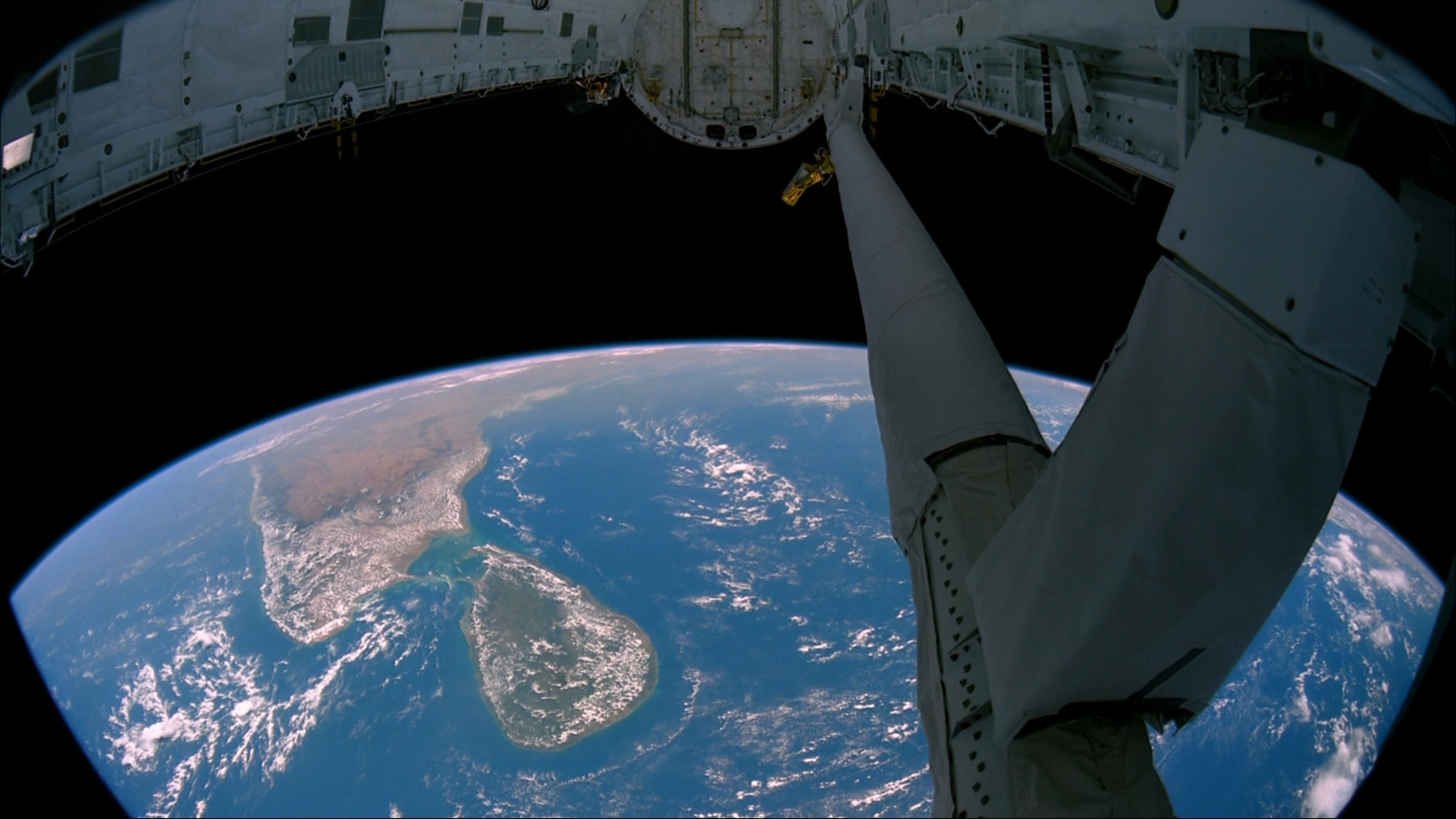
- Sri Lanka viewed from the Space Shuttle Atlantis (2012)

- Location within Asia
- Etymology: śrī ('resplendent') + Laṅkā (island fortress in Hindu epics)

Geography
- Location: Indian Ocean
- Coordinates: 7°N 81°E
- Adjacent to: Indian Ocean; Bay of Bengal (northeast); Laccadive Sea (southwest); Palk Strait (northwest)
- Area: 65,612 km^{2} (25,333 sq mi)
- Area rank: 25th
- Coastline: 1,785 km (1109.1 mi)
- Highest elevation: 2,524 m (8281 ft)
- Highest point: Pidurutalagala

Administration
- Sri Lanka
- Provinces: Central; Eastern; North Central; Northern; North Western; Sabaragamuwa; Southern; Uva; Western
- Largest settlement: Colombo (pop. 752,993)

Demographics
- Population: 20,277,597 (2012)
- Population rank: 12th
- Pop. density: 323/km^{2} (837/sq mi)
- Languages: Sinhala; Tamil (Sri Lankan dialects); English (Sri Lankan English); Sri Lanka Malay; Sri Lankan Sign; Vedda
- Ethnic groups: Sinhalese (75%); Sri Lanka Tamils (16%); Sri Lankan Moors (9%); Indians (Indian Tamils); Burghers; Vedda

Additional information
- Time zone: Sri Lanka Standard Time (UTC+05:30)
- Official website: gov.lk

Sri Lanka, formerly called Ceylon, is an island country in the Indian Ocean, southeast of the Indian subcontinent, in a strategic location near major sea lanes. The nation has a total area of 65,610 square kilometres (25,330 sq mi), with 64,630 square kilometres (24,950 sq mi) of land and 980 square kilometres (380 sq mi) of water. Its coastline is 1,340 kilometres (830 mi) long. The main island of Sri Lanka has an area of 64, 058 km^{2}; it is the twenty-fifth largest island in the world by area, similar in size to Tasmania. Dozens of offshore islands account for the remaining 1552 km^{2} area. The largest offshore island is the Mannar Island, linked to Adam's Bridge, a land connection to the Indian mainland, which is now mostly submerged with only a chain of limestone shoals remaining above sea level. According to temple records, this natural causeway was formerly whole, but was breached by a violent storm (probably a cyclone) in 1480. The formation is also known as Rama's Bridge, as according to Hindu mythology, it was constructed during the rule of Lord Rama. The Jaffna Peninsula can also be considered a near-insular landmass at the northern tip of Ceylon, separated from the mainland by the Jaffna and Chundikkulam Lagoons.

Sri Lanka's climate includes tropical monsoons; the northeast monsoon (December to March), and the southwest monsoon (June to October). Its terrain is mostly low, flat to rolling plain, with the mountainous upcountry in the south-central interior. The highest point is Pidurutalagala at 2,524 m (8,281 ft). Natural resources include limestone, graphite, mineral sands, gems, phosphates, and clay.

== Topography ==
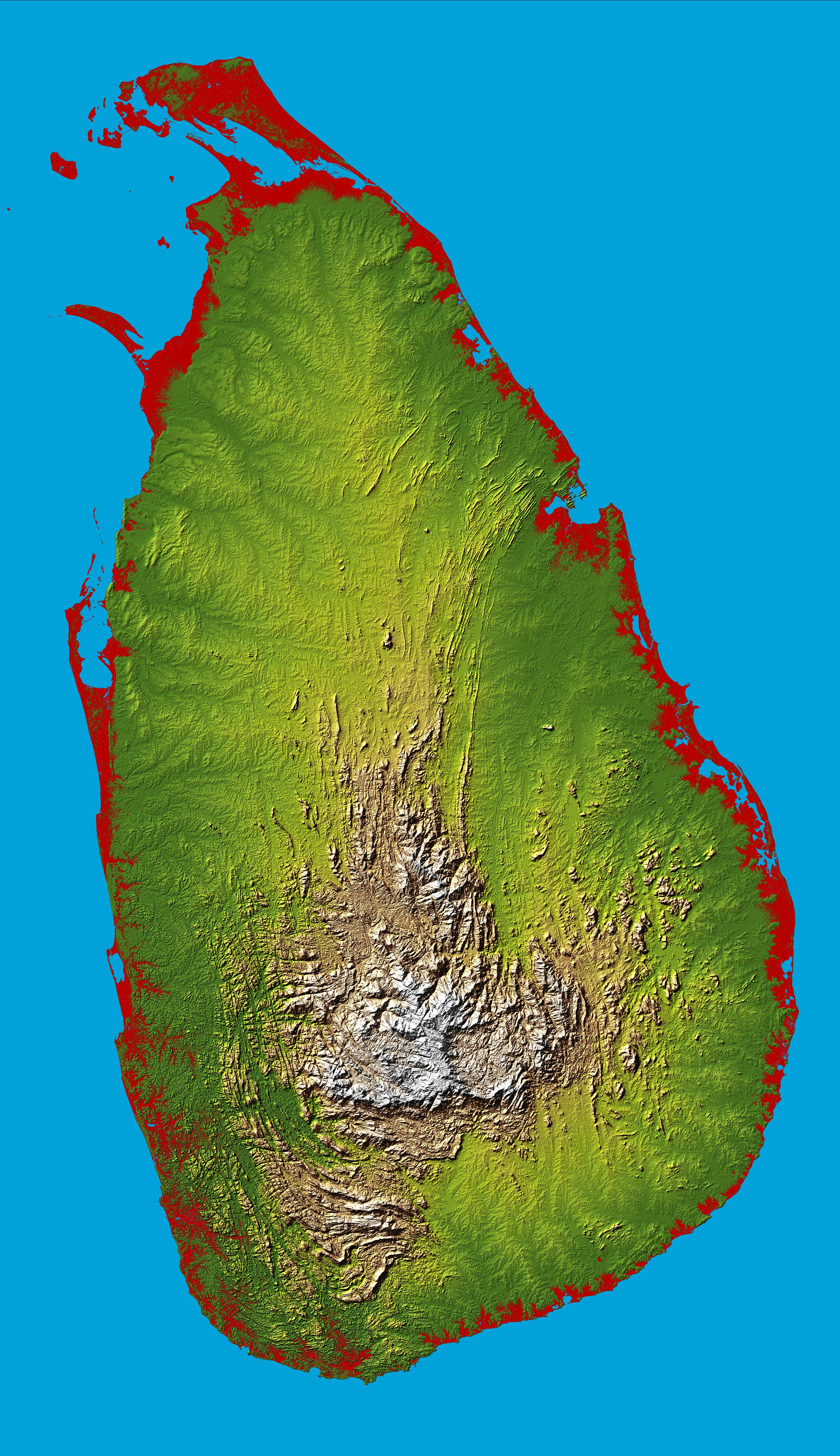
Topography of Sri Lanka

Extensive faulting and erosion over time have produced a wide range of topographic features. Three zones are distinguishable by elevation: the Central Highlands, the plains, and the coastal belt.

The south-central part of Sri Lanka—the rugged Central Highlands—is the heart of the country. The core of this area is a high plateau, running north–south for approximately 65 kilometers. This area includes Sri Lanka's highest mountains. (Pidurutalagala is the highest at 2,524 m) At the plateau's southern end, mountain ranges stretch 50 kilometers to the west toward Adam's Peak (2,243 meters) and 50 kilometers to the east toward Namunukula (2,036 m). Flanking the high central ridges are two lower plateaus. On the west is the Hatton Plateau, a deeply dissected series of ridges sloping downward toward the north. On the east, the Uva Basin consists of rolling hills covered with grasses, traversed by some deep valleys and gorges. To the north, separated from the main body of mountains and plateaus by broad valleys, lies the Knuckles Massif: steep escarpments, deep gorges, and peaks rising to more than 1,800 meters. South of Adam's Peak lie the parallel ridges of the Rakwana Hills, with several peaks over 1,400 meters. The land descends from the Central Highlands to a series of escarpments and ledges at 400 to 500 meters above sea level before sloping down toward the coastal plains.

Most of the island's surface consists of plains between 30 and 200 meters above sea level. In the southwest, ridges and valleys rise gradually to merge with the Central Highlands, giving a dissected appearance to the plain. Extensive erosion in this area has worn down the ridges and deposited rich soil for agriculture downstream. In the southeast, a red, lateritic soil covers relatively level ground that is studded with bare, monolithic hills. The transition from the plain to the Central Highlands is abrupt in the southeast, and the mountains appear to rise up like a wall. In the east and the north, the plain is flat, dissected by long, narrow ridges of granite running from the Central Highlands.

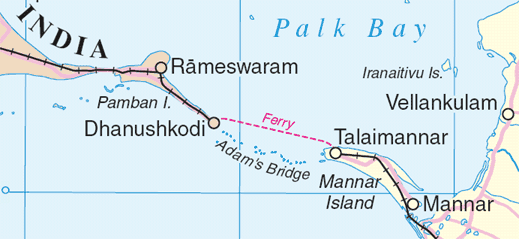
Rama's Bridge, a shoal "connecting" (northwestern) Sri Lanka (Talaimannar on Mannar island in that district) and (southern) India (Dhanushkodi (extinct)/Rameswaram in Ramanathapuram District) between the Gulf of Mannar (southwest) from the Palk Strait (northeast).

A coastal belt about thirty meters above sea level surrounds the island. Much of the coast consists of scenic sandy beaches indented by coastal lagoons. In the Jaffna Peninsula, limestone beds are exposed to the waves as low-lying cliffs in a few places. In the northeast and the southwest, where the coast cuts across the stratification of the crystalline rocks, rocky cliffs, bays, and offshore islands can be found; these conditions have created one of the world's best natural harbors at Trincomalee on the northeast coast, and a smaller rock harbor at Galle on the southwestern coast.

Sri Lanka's rivers rise in the Central Highlands and flow in a radial pattern toward the sea. Most of these rivers are short. There are 16 principal rivers longer than 100 kilometers in length, with twelve of them carrying about 75% of the mean river discharge in the entire country. The longest rivers are the Mahaweli Ganga (335 km) and the Malvathu River (170 km). In the highlands, river courses are frequently broken by discontinuities in the terrain, and where they encounter escarpments, numerous waterfalls and rapids have eroded a passage. Once they reach the plain, the rivers slow down and the waters meander across flood plains and deltas. The upper reaches of the rivers are wild and usually unnavigable, and the lower reaches are prone to seasonal flooding. Human intervention has altered the flows of some rivers in order to create hydroelectric, irrigation, and transportation projects. In the north, east, and southeast, the rivers feed numerous artificial lakes or reservoirs (tanks) that store water during the dry season. During the 1970s and 1980s, large-scale projects dammed the Mahaweli Ganga and neighboring streams to create large lakes along their courses. Several hundred kilometers of canals, most of which were built by the Dutch in the 18th century, link inland waterways in the southwestern part of Sri Lanka.

== Climate ==
Sri Lanka map of Köppen climate classification zones

Sri Lanka is the nineteenth most water stressed country in the world.

Sri Lanka's climate can be described as tropical, and quite hot. Its position between 5 and 10 north latitude endows the country with year-round warm weather, moderated by ocean winds and considerable moisture. The average temperature ranges from a low of 16 °C (60.8 °F) in Nuwara Eliya in the Central Highlands (where frost may occur for several days in the winter) to a high of 32 °C (89.6 °F) in Trincomalee on the northeast coast (where temperatures may reach 38 °C or 100.4 °F). The average yearly temperature for the country as a whole ranges from 28 to 30 °C (82.4 to 86.0 °F). Day and night temperatures may vary by 4 to 7 °C (7.2 to 12.6 °F). January is the coolest month, especially in the highlands, where overnight temperatures may fall to 5 °C (41 °F). May, the hottest period, precedes the summer monsoon rains.

The rainfall pattern is influenced by the monsoon winds of the Indian Ocean and Bay of Bengal and is marked by four seasons. The first is from mid-May to October, when winds originate in the southwest, bringing moisture from the Indian Ocean. When these winds encounter the slopes of the Central Highlands, they unload heavy rains on the mountain slopes and the southwestern sector of the island. Some of the windward slopes receive up to 2,500 mm (98.4 in) of rain per month, but the leeward slopes in the east and northeast receive little rain. The second season occurs in October and November, the intermonsoonal months. During this season, periodic squalls occur and sometimes tropical cyclones bring overcast skies and rains to the southwest, northeast, and eastern parts of the island. During the third season, December to March, monsoon winds come from the northeast, bringing moisture from the Bay of Bengal. The northeastern slopes of the mountains may be inundated with up to 1,250 mm (49.2 in) of rain during these months. Another intermonsoonal period occurs from March until mid-May, with light, variable winds and evening thundershowers.

An increase in average rainfall coupled with heavier rainfall events has resulted in recurrent flooding and related damages to infrastructure, utility supply and the urban economy.

Humidity is typically higher in the southwest and mountainous areas and depends on the seasonal patterns of rainfall. At Colombo, for example, daytime humidity stays above 70% all year, rising to over 90% percent during the monsoon season in June. Anuradhapura experiences a daytime low of 60% during the intermonsoonal month of March, but a high of 79% during the November and December rains. In the highlands, Kandy's daytime humidity usually ranges between 70 and 79%.

Climate data for Colombo, Sri Lanka (1961–1990, extremes 1961–2012)
Month	Jan	Feb	Mar	Apr	May	Jun	Jul	Aug	Sep	Oct	Nov	Dec	Year
Record high °C (°F)	35.2 (95.4)	35.6 (96.1)	36.1 (97.0)	35.2 (95.4)	33.2 (91.8)	33.5 (92.3)	32.2 (90.0)	32.2 (90.0)	32.5 (90.5)	33.6 (92.5)	34.0 (93.2)	35.0 (95.0)	36.1 (97.0)
Mean daily maximum °C (°F)	31.0 (87.8)	31.2 (88.2)	31.7 (89.1)	31.8 (89.2)	31.1 (88.0)	30.4 (86.7)	30.0 (86.0)	30.0 (86.0)	30.2 (86.4)	30.0 (86.0)	30.2 (86.4)	30.4 (86.7)	30.7 (87.3)
Daily mean °C (°F)	26.6 (79.9)	26.9 (80.4)	27.7 (81.9)	28.2 (82.8)	28.3 (82.9)	27.9 (82.2)	27.6 (81.7)	27.6 (81.7)	27.5 (81.5)	27.0 (80.6)	26.7 (80.1)	26.6 (79.9)	27.4 (81.3)
Mean daily minimum °C (°F)	22.3 (72.1)	22.7 (72.9)	23.7 (74.7)	24.6 (76.3)	25.5 (77.9)	25.5 (77.9)	25.1 (77.2)	25.1 (77.2)	24.8 (76.6)	24.0 (75.2)	23.2 (73.8)	22.8 (73.0)	24.1 (75.4)
Record low °C (°F)	16.4 (61.5)	18.8 (65.8)	17.7 (63.9)	21.2 (70.2)	20.5 (68.9)	21.4 (70.5)	21.4 (70.5)	21.6 (70.9)	21.2 (70.2)	21.0 (69.8)	18.6 (65.5)	18.1 (64.6)	16.4 (61.5)
Average precipitation mm (inches)	58.2 (2.29)	72.7 (2.86)	128.0 (5.04)	245.6 (9.67)	392.4 (15.45)	184.9 (7.28)	121.9 (4.80)	119.5 (4.70)	245.4 (9.66)	365.4 (14.39)	414.4 (16.31)	175.3 (6.90)	2,523.7 (99.35)
Average precipitation days	5	5	9	14	16	16	12	11	15	17	15	10	145
Average relative humidity (%) (at Daytime)	69	69	71	75	78	79	78	77	78	78	76	73	75
Mean monthly sunshine hours	248.0	246.4	275.9	234.0	201.5	195.0	201.5	201.5	189.0	201.5	210.0	217.0	2,621.3
Source 1: NOAA World Meteorological Organization (precipitation only)
Source 2: Deutscher Wetterdienst (extremes)

Climate data for Kandy
Month	Jan	Feb	Mar	Apr	May	Jun	Jul	Aug	Sep	Oct	Nov	Dec	Year
Mean daily maximum °C (°F)	27 (81)	28 (82)	30 (86)	30 (86)	29 (84)	28 (82)	27 (81)	28 (82)	28 (82)	28 (82)	27 (81)	27 (81)	28 (83)
Daily mean °C (°F)	23.1 (73.6)	24.1 (75.4)	25.4 (77.7)	25.9 (78.6)	25.6 (78.1)	24.8 (76.6)	24.3 (75.7)	24.4 (75.9)	24.3 (75.7)	24.3 (75.7)	24 (75)	23.7 (74.7)	24.5 (76.1)
Mean daily minimum °C (°F)	18 (64)	18 (64)	18 (64)	20 (68)	20 (68)	20 (68)	20 (68)	19 (66)	19 (66)	19 (66)	19 (66)	18 (64)	19 (66)
Average precipitation mm (inches)	79 (3.1)	74 (2.9)	71 (2.8)	188 (7.4)	144 (5.7)	132 (5.2)	128 (5.0)	113 (4.4)	155 (6.1)	264 (10.4)	296 (11.7)	196 (7.7)	1,840 (72.4)
Average rainy days	6	5	8	14	11	15	14	13	13	17	16	14	146
Mean daily sunshine hours	7	8	8	7	6	6	6	6	6	6	6	6	7
Source 1: Weather2Travel for highs, lows and sunshine, Climate-Data.org for daily mean temperatures (altitude: 518 m)
Source 2: World Climate Guide, HolidayCheck.com, World Climate

== Ecological zones ==
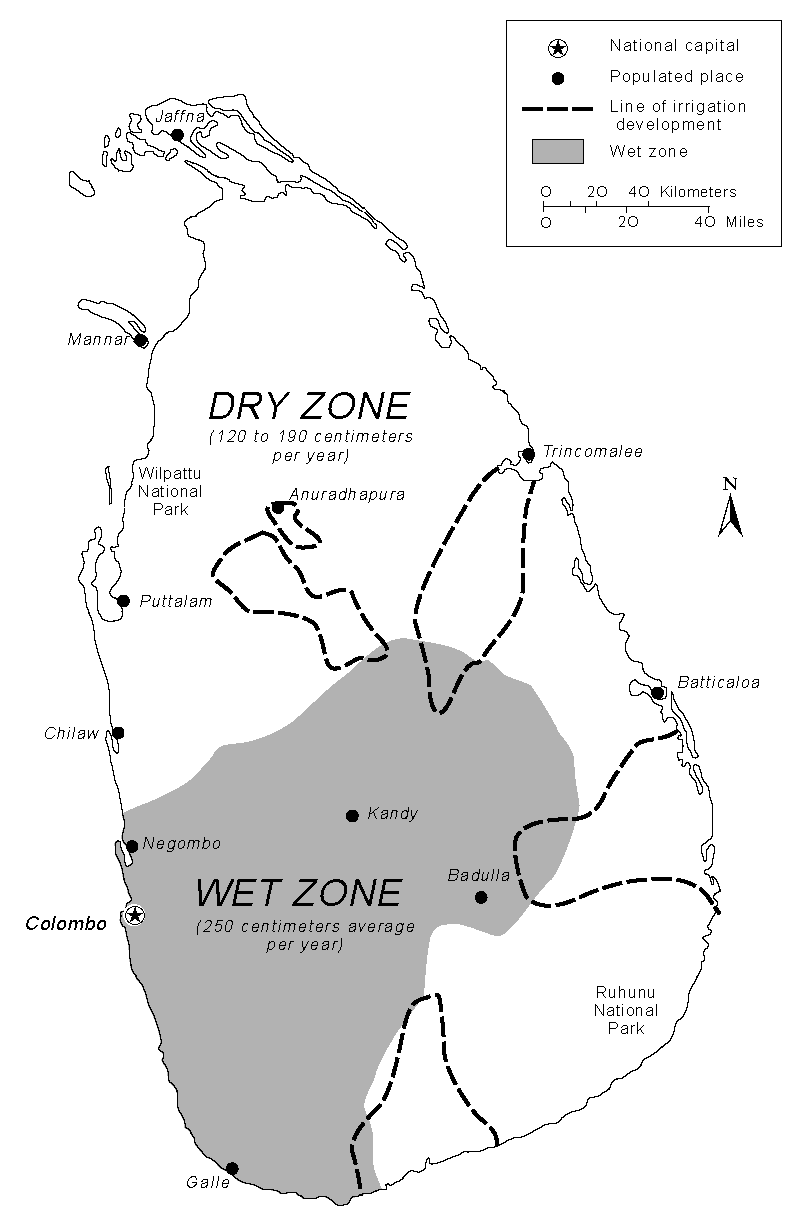
Precipitation and irrigation map of Sri Lanka

The pattern of life in Sri Lanka depends directly on the availability of rainwater. The mountains and the southwestern part of the country, known as the "wet zone," receive ample rainfall (an annual average of 2500 millimeters). Most of the southeast, east, and northern parts of the country comprise the "dry zone,” which receives between 1200 and 1900 mm of rain annually. Much of the rain in these areas falls from October to January; during the rest of the year there is very little precipitation, and all living creatures must conserve precious moisture. The arid northwest and southeast coasts receive the least amount of rain—600 to 1200 mm per year—concentrated within the short period of the winter monsoon.

The natural vegetation of the dry zone has adapted to the annual change from flood to drought. The typical ground cover is scrub forest, interspersed with tough bushes and cactuses in the driest areas. Plants grow very fast from November to February when rainfall is heavy, but stop growing during the hot season from March to August. Various adaptations to the dry conditions have developed. To conserve water, trees have thick bark; most have tiny leaves, and some drop their leaves during this season. Also, the topmost branches of the tallest trees often interlace, forming a canopy against the hot sun and a barrier to the dry wind. When water is absent, the plains of the dry zone are dominated by browns and grays. When water becomes available, either during the wet season or through proximity to rivers and lakes, the vegetation explodes into shades of green with a wide variety of beautiful flowers. Varieties of flowering acacias are well adapted to the arid conditions and flourish on the Jaffna Peninsula. Among the trees of the dry-land forests are some valuable species, such as satinwood, ebony, ironwood, and mahogany.

In the wet zone, the dominant vegetation of the lowlands is a tropical evergreen forest, with tall trees, broad foliage, and a dense undergrowth of vines and creepers. Subtropical evergreen forests resembling those of temperate climates flourish in the higher altitudes. Montane vegetation at the highest altitudes tends to be stunted and windswept.

Forests at one time covered nearly the entire island, but by the late 20th century lands classified as forests and forest reserves covered only one-fifth of the land. The southwestern interior contains the only large remnants of the original forests of the wet zone. The government has attempted to preserve sanctuaries for natural vegetation and animal life, however. Ruhunu National Park in the southeast protects herds of elephant, deer, and peacocks, and Wilpattu National Park in the northwest preserves the habitats of many water birds, such as storks, pelicans, ibis, and spoonbills. During the Mahaweli Ganga Program of the 1970s and 1980s in northern Sri Lanka, the government set aside four areas of land totalling 1,900 km^{2} as national parks.

== Land use and settlement patterns ==
Diagrammatic section across Sri Lanka as per D. N. Wadia

The dominant pattern of human settlement during the last 2,500 years has consisted of village farming communities. Even in the 1980s, the majority of people lived in small villages and worked at agricultural pursuits. Traditional farming techniques and life-styles revolve around two types of farming--"wet" and "dry"—depending upon the availability of water.

The typical settlement pattern in the rice-growing areas is a compact group of houses or neighborhood surrounding one or several religious centers that serve as the focus for communal activities. Sometimes the houses may be situated along a major road and include a few shops, or the village may include several outlying hamlets. The life-sustaining rice fields begin where the houses end and stretch into the distance. Some irrigated fields may include other cash crops, such as sugarcane, or groves of coconut trees. Palmyra trees grow on the borders of fields or along roads and paths. Individual houses also may have vegetable gardens in their compounds. During the rainy seasons and thereafter, when the fields are covered by growing crops, the village environment is intensely verdant.

The nature of agricultural pursuits in Sri Lanka has changed over the centuries and has usually depended upon the availability of arable land and water resources. In earlier times, when villagers had access to plentiful forests that separated settlements from each other, slash-and-burn agriculture was a standard technique. As expanding population and commercial pressures reduced the amount of available forestland, however, slash-and-burn cultivation steadily declined in favor of permanent cultivation by private owners. Until the 13th century, the village farming communities were mainly on the northern plains around Anuradhapura and then Polonnaruwa, but they later shifted to the southwest. In the 1970s, wide expanses of the northern and eastern plains were sparsely populated, with scattered villages each huddled around an artificial lake. The Jaffna Peninsula, although a dry area, is densely populated and intensively cultivated. The southwest contains most of the people, and villages are densely clustered with little unused land. In the Central Highlands around Kandy, villagers faced with limited flat land have developed intricately terraced hillsides where they grow rice. In the 1960s and 1970s, the wet cultivation area was expanding rapidly, as the government implemented large-scale irrigation projects to restore the dry zone to agricultural productivity. In the 1970s, the area drained by the Mahaweli Ganga changed from a sparsely inhabited region to a wet rice area similar to the southwest. Through such projects, the government of Sri Lanka has planned to recreate in the dry zone the lush, landscape associated with the irrigation works in ancient Sri Lanka.

Beginning in the 16th century and culminating during the British rule of the 19th and 20th centuries, the plantation economy came to dominate large sections of the highlands. Plantation farming resulted in a drastic reduction in the natural forest cover and the substitution of domesticated crops, such as rubber, tea, or cinnamon. It also brought about a changed life-style, as the last hunting-and-gathering societies retreated into smaller areas and laborers moved into the highlands to work on plantations. Through the late 20th century, workers on large plantations lived in villages of small houses or in "line rooms" containing ten to twelve units. The numerous plantations of small landholders frequently included attached hamlets of workers in addition to the independent houses of the plantation owners.

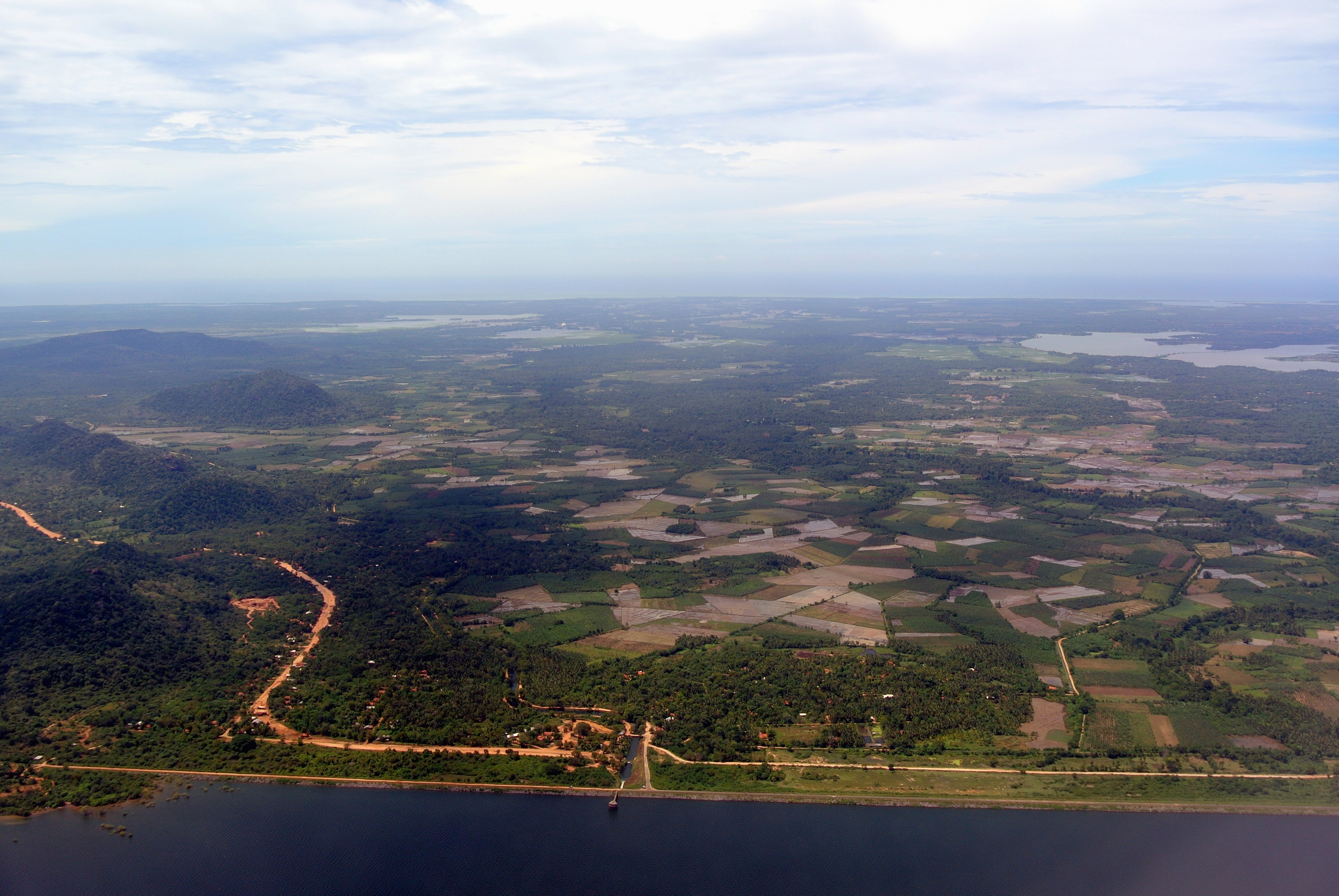
Aerial view of the Southern Province showing the land use patterns of the coastal belt.

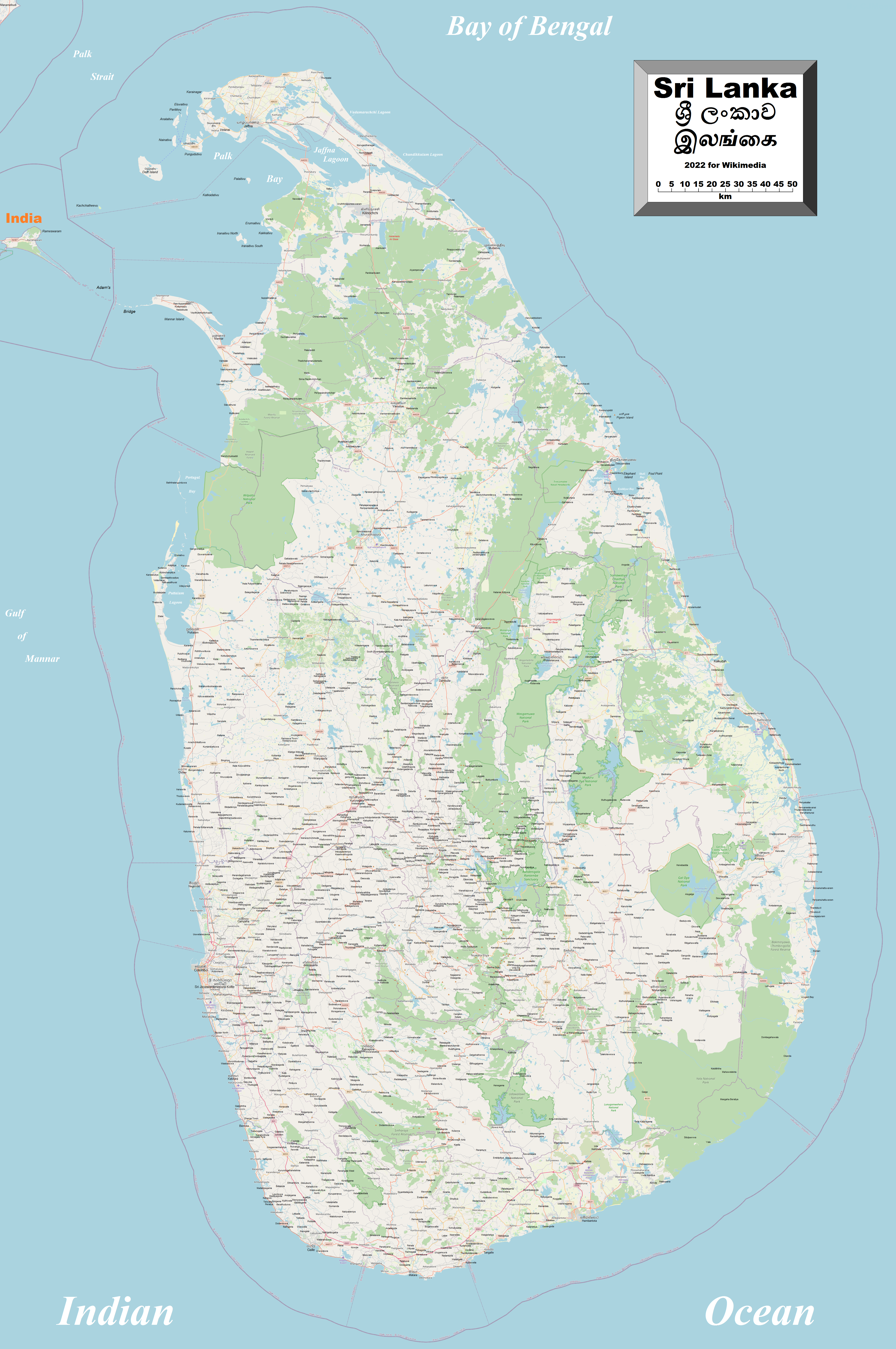
Detailed map of Sri Lanka

The coastal belt surrounding the island contains a different settlement pattern that has evolved from older fishing villages. Separate fishing settlements expanded laterally along the coast, linked by a coastal highway and a railway. The mobility of the coastal population during colonial times and after independence led to an increase in the size and number of villages, as well as to the development of growing urban centers with outside contacts. In the 1980s, it was possible to drive for many kilometers along the southwest coast without finding a break in the string of villages and bazaar centers merging into each other and into towns.

=== Statistics ===
Land use (2018): 20.7% arable land, 15.8% permanent crops, 7% permanent pasture, 29.4% forest, 27.1% other.

Irrigated land: 5,700 km^{2} (2012)

Total renewable water resources: 52.8 cubic km

Natural hazards: occasional cyclones and tornadoes

Environmental issues: deforestation; soil erosion; wildlife populations threatened by poaching and urbanization; coastal degradation from mining activities and increased pollution; freshwater resources being polluted by industrial wastes and sewage runoff; waste disposal; air pollution in Colombo

== Maritime claims ==
- contiguous zone: 24 nmi (44.4 km; 27.6 mi)
- continental shelf: 200 nmi (370.4 km; 230.2 mi) or to the edge of the continental margin
- exclusive economic zone: 200 nmi (370.4 km; 230.2 mi)
- territorial sea: 12 nmi (22.2 km; 13.8 mi)

== See also ==
- Environment of Sri Lanka
- Extreme points of Sri Lanka
- 2000 Sri Lanka cyclone
